= Death from Above discography =

The following is a discography of the Canadian band Death from Above.

== Albums ==
=== Studio albums ===
Title	Album details	Peak chart positions										Certifications
Title	Album details	CAN	AUS	BEL	GER	IRL	JPN	SCO	UK	UK Rock	US	Certifications
You're a Woman, I'm a Machine	Released: October 26, 2004; Label: Last Gang; Formats: CD, LP, DI	—	—	—	—	—	—	85	84	6	—	MC: Gold
The Physical World	Released: September 9, 2014; Label: Last Gang; Formats: CD, LP, DI	3	74	65	—	68	145	32	37	2	28	
Outrage! Is Now	Released: September 8, 2017; Label: Last Gang; Formats: CD, LP, DI	20	—	—	—	—	—	—	— (Note: "Outrage! Is Now" did not enter the UK Albums Chart, but peaked at number 90 on the UK Albums Downloads Chart.)	13	— (Note: Outrage! Is Now did not enter the US Billboard 200, but peaked at number 59 on the US Album Sales Chart.)	
Is 4 Lovers	Released: March 26, 2021; Label: Everything Eleven/Universal Music Canada; Formats: CD, LP, DI	—	—	—	63	—	—	47	— (Note: "Is 4 Lovers" did not enter the UK Albums Chart, but peaked at number 72 on the UK Albums Downloads Chart.)	8	— (Note: Is 4 Lovers did not enter the US Billboard 200, but peaked at number 87 on the US Album Sales Chart.)	
"—" denotes a recording that did not chart or was not released in that territory.

=== Remix albums ===
Title	Album details	Peak chart positions
Title	Album details	US Dance
Romance Bloody Romance: Remixes & B-Sides	Released: October 18, 2005; Label: Last Gang; Formats: CD, DI	22

=== Live albums ===
Title	Album details
Live at Third Man Records	Released: April 22, 2016; Label: Third Man; Formats: CD, LP, DI

== Extended plays ==
Title	EP details
Heads Up	Released: December 15, 2002; Label: Ache; Formats: CD, LP, DI
Romantic Rights	Released: April 13, 2004; Label: Sound Virus; Formats: CD, LP, DI

== Singles ==
Title	Year	Peak chart positions									Certifications	Album
Title	Year	CAN	CAN Rock	MEX Air.	SCO	UK	UK Rock	US Alt.	US Main. Rock	US Rock	Certifications	Album
"Romantic Rights"	2004	—	—	—	67	57	4	—	—	—		You're a Woman, I'm a Machine
"Blood on Our Hands"	2005	—	—	—	39	33	—	—	—	—		You're a Woman, I'm a Machine
"Black History Month"	2005	—	—	—	48	48	4	—	—			You're a Woman, I'm a Machine
"Trainwreck 1979"	2014	83	3	34	—	—	—	14	22	33		The Physical World
"Government Trash"	2014	—	—	—	—	—	—	—	—	—		The Physical World
"Virgins"	2015	—	35	45	—	—	—	—	—	—		The Physical World
"Freeze Me"	2017	—	3	34	—	—	—	—	25	— (Note: "Freeze Me" did not enter the Hot Rock Songs chart, but peaked at number 47 on the Rock Airplay chart.)	MC: Gold	Outrage! Is Now
"Never Swim Alone"	2017	—	—	—	—	—	—	—	—	—		Outrage! Is Now
"Holy Books"	2017	—	—	—	—	—	—	—	—	—		Outrage! Is Now
"One + One"	2021	—	7	—	—	—	—	—	—	—		Is 4 Lovers
"Free Animal"	2021	—	—	—	—	—	—	—	—	—		Is 4 Lovers
"Love Letter (At Home)"	2022	—	—	—	—	—	—	—	—	—		Is 4 Lovers
"Don't Stop Believin'"	2022	—	—	—	—	—	—	—	—	—		Non-album singles
"Turn It Out XX"	2024	—	—	—	—	—	—	—	—	—		Non-album singles
"Romantic Rights XX"	2024	—	—	—	—	—	—	—	—	—		Non-album singles
"Going Steady XX"	2024	—	—	—	—	—	—	—	—	—		Non-album singles
"Private Lives"	2026	—	30	—	—	—	—	—	—	—		Private Lives
"—" denotes a recording that did not chart or was not released in that territory.

== Other charted songs ==
List of songs, with selected chart positions, showing year released and album name
Title	Year	Peak chart positions		Album
Title	Year	CAN Rock	MEX Air.	Album
"White Is Red"	2015	38	39	The Physical World
"Nomad"	2017	—	46	Outrage! Is Now
"Caught Up"	2018	5	—	Outrage! Is Now
"Keep It Real Dumb"	2018	47	—	"Freeze Me" single
"—" denotes a recording that did not chart or was not released in that territory.

== Music videos ==
List of music videos, showing year released and directors
Title	Year	Director(s)	Refs
"Romantic Rights"	2005		
"Pull Out"	2005		
"Blood on Our Hands"	2005		
"Black History Month"	2006		
"Sexy Results" (MSTRKRFT Edition)			
"Trainwreck 1979"	2014	Alexa Karolinski	
"Virgins"	2015	Eva Michon	
"White is Red"	2015	Eva Michon	
"Freeze Me"	2017	Tim Lynch and Michael Pizzo	
"Never Swim Alone"	2017	Sebastien Grainger	
"Caught Up"	2018	Eva Michon	
"One + One"	2021	Eva Michon	
"Modern Guy"	2021	Alex P. Smith	
