= Romantic Rights =

Single by Death from Above 1979

from the album You're a Woman, I'm a Machine
- Released: November 4, 2004
- Recorded: February – April 2004
- Genre: Dance-punk; hard rock; noise rock
- Length: 3:15
- Label: 679
- Songwriter(s): Sebastien Grainger; Jesse F. Keeler
- Producer(s): Al-P

Death from Above 1979 singles chronology
"Romantic Rights" (2004)	"Blood on Our Hands" (2005)

"Romantic Rights" is the first single from Death from Above 1979's debut album You're a Woman, I'm a Machine. Released in 2004, it reached number 57 on the UK Singles Chart. Prior to the band's first name change, a self-titled extended play was released on April 13, 2004, consisting of four songs.

The song plays as the intro to, and throughout, the MTV show Human Giant. The song appears on the soundtrack for video games SSX On Tour and NBA 2K15, the latter which was curated by music producer Pharrell Williams. The band played "Romantic Rights" on Late Night with Conan O'Brien, with Grainger drumming for the first half of the performance and Late Night's Max Weinberg on the same drum set for the second.

== Track listing ==
=== 7" vinyl ===
Side A
No.	Title	Length
1.	"Romantic Rights"	3:18

Side B
No.	Title	Length
1.	"Romantic Rights" (The Phones Lovers remix)	4:41

679 – 679L090

=== 12" vinyl ===
Side A
No.	Title	Length
1.	"Romantic Rights" (Erol Alkan's Love from Below Re-Edit)	6:21

Side B
No.	Title	Length
1.	"Romantic Rights" (The Phones Lovers remix)	4:41
2.	"Romantic Rights" (Marczech Makuziak remix)	3:57

679 – 679L090T

== Extended play ==
Romantic Rights

EP by Death from Above
- Released: April 13, 2004
- Recorded: November 2003
- Genre: Indie rock
- Length: 12:58
- Label: Sound Virus Records

Death from Above chronology
Heads Up (2002)	Romantic Rights (2004)	You're a Woman, I'm a Machine (2004)

The EP consists of four songs including two early versions of songs from You're a Woman, I'm a Machine, one song exclusive to the EP and a remix of the title track. It was released by Sound Virus Records in the United States.

=== Track listing ===
No.	Title	Length
1.	"We Don't Sleep at Night"	1:56
2.	"Romantic Rights"	2:57
3.	"Pull Out"	1:56
4.	"Romantic Rights" (Girlsareshort Remix)	6:09

=== Personnel ===
Death from Above

- Jesse F. Keeler – bass guitar, synthesizer
- Sebastien Grainger – drums, vocals

Additional

- Scott Soares – percussion on "Romantic Rights" (Girlsareshort Remix)
- Al Puodziukas – engineering, recording, production on "Romantic Rights" (Girlsareshort Remix)
- Dan Zabawa – recording and production on "Romantic Rights" (Girlsareshort Remix)
- Brian Roettinger – design
- Eva Michon – photography

== Charts ==
Chart (2004)	Peak position
UK Singles (OCC)	57
