= Romance Bloody Romance: Remixes & B-Sides =

Remix album by Death from Above 1979
- Released: October 18, 2005
- Genre: Dance; dance-punk
- Length: 57:16
- Label: Last Gang
- Producer: Al-P

Death from Above 1979 chronology
You're a Woman, I'm a Machine (2004)	Romance Bloody Romance: Remixes & B-Sides (2005)	The Physical World (2014)

Professional ratings
Review scores
Source	Rating
Allmusic	link
Pitchfork Media	(0.5/10) link
Spin	(B+) link

Romance Bloody Romance: Remixes & B-Sides is a 2005 remix album by Death from Above (then known as Death from Above 1979). This album is a collection of remixes of songs featured on the album You're a Woman, I'm a Machine released in October 2004. The tracks "Better Off Dead" and "You're Lovely (But You've Got Problems)" are B-sides. The group MSTRKRFT was, at the time, a side project of Jesse F. Keeler, who was one half of Death from Above 1979. The Girl on Girl name is the alias of the other half of Death from Above 1979, Sebastien Grainger. The album is their only release to chart on Billboard by hitting number twenty-two on its Top Electronic Albums chart.

== Track listing ==
No.	Title	Length
1.	"Better Off Dead" (La Peste Cover)	2:17
2.	"Blood on Our Hands" (Justice Remix)	3:52
3.	"Romantic Rights" (Erol Alkan's Love From Below Re-Edit)	6:20
4.	"Black History Month" (Alan Braxe & Fred Falke Remix)	5:21
5.	"Little Girl" (MSTRKRFT Edition)	3:36
6.	"Romantic Rights" (The Phones Lovers Remix)	4:40
7.	"Black History Month" (Josh Homme Remix)	4:39
8.	"You're Lovely (But You've Got Problems)"	3:06
9.	"Romantic Rights" (Marczech Makuziak Remix)	3:57
10.	"Black History Month" (Sammy Danger Remix)	4:04
11.	"Romantic Rights" (Dahlback Remix)	5:44
12.	"Black History Month" (Girl on Girl Revision featuring Final Fantasy)	4:25
13.	"Sexy Results" (MSTRKRFT Edition)	5:09

Note: "You're Lovely (But You've Got Problems)" was also released under the name "Girl U R Lovely" on their Live Session (iTunes Exclusive) EP

== Personnel ==
Death From Above 1979

- Jesse F. Keeler – bass guitar, synthesizer, songwriting on all tracks except 1, production on track 1
- Sebastien Grainger – drums, vocals, songwriting on all tracks except 1, production on tracks 1 and 12

Additional personnel

- Owen Pallett – backing vocals and string arrangement on track 12
- Al-P – production on all tracks except track 8
- Paul Epworth – production on track 8
- Leon Taheny – production on track 12
- Noah Mintz – mastering
- Mark Andreasson – songwriting on track 1
- Peter Dayton – songwriting on track 1
