= Mortal Kombat: Songs Inspired by the Warriors =

Soundtrack album by Various Artists
- Released: April 5, 2011
- Genre: Electronic music
- Label: WaterTower Music / Teenage Riot Records
- Producer: JFK, Rishi Shah, Jamal Dauda

Professional ratings
Review scores
Source	Rating
AllMusic	3.5/5 stars

Mortal Kombat: Songs Inspired by the Warriors is a compilation album featuring songs inspired by the iconic warriors from the Mortal Kombat game series. The soundtrack coincided with the release of the 2011 installment in the video game series, Mortal Kombat. Similar to the 1994 release of Mortal Kombat: The Album, the music is electronic and dance-based.

== Album information ==
Executive producer JFK (of the DJ/production duo MSTRKRFT and Death From Above 1979) used various electronic artists to create songs based on individual characters from the MK franchise, as well as creating a song of his own for the project.

The album had three singles released to digital outlets. The first single, "Mileena's Theme" by Tokimonsta, was released on January 31, 2011. Subsequent singles, "Liu Kang's Theme" by Congorock, and "Helado (Sub-Zero's Theme)" by Harvard Bass, were released on February 10, 2011.

"Reptile's Theme" by Skrillex is used for television advertisements of the 2011 video game. This theme has also been used in the 2nd trailer for Teenage Mutant Ninja Turtles (2014).

== Track listing ==
Track list:

No.	Title	Artist	Length
1.	"Deathstalker (Scorpion's Theme)"	JFK of MSTRKRFT	4:28
2.	"Mileena's Theme"	Tokimonsta	3:28
3.	"Helado (Sub-Zero's Theme)"	Harvard Bass	7:22
4.	"Liu Kang's Theme"	Congorock	3:42
5.	"Goro's Theme"	Bird Peterson	6:12
6.	"Reptile's Theme"	Skrillex	3:56
7.	"Raiden's Theme"	9th Wonder	2:22
8.	"Johnny Cage's Theme"	LA Riots	4:26
9.	"Baraka's Theme"	Run DMT	3:53
10.	"Kung Lao's Theme"	Felix Cartal	5:41
11.	"Kano's Theme"	Them Jeans	4:49
12.	"Shao Kahn's Theme"	Sound of Stereo	5:06
13.	"Noob Saibot's Theme"	AraabMuzik	2:52

Track 13 is the Mortal Kombat: Komplete Edition exclusive bonus track.
