= Unicorn Steak =

Compilation album by Die Mannequin
- Released: November 13, 2007 (Canada); March 4, 2008 (United States)
- Genre: Alternative rock, punk rock, glam punk
- Length: 35:59
- Label: How to Kill
- Producer: Ian D'Sa, Junior Sanchez, MSTRKRFT, Krisjan Leslie, Eric Ratz, Kenny Luong

Die Mannequin chronology
Slaughter Daughter (2007)	Unicorn Steak (2007)	FINO + BLEED (2009)

Unicorn Steak (American Cover)

Unicorn Steak is the first studio album by the Canadian rock band Die Mannequin, released on November 13, 2007, in Canada and March 4, 2008, in the United States. Unicorn Steak is a compilation of Die Mannequin's first two studio eps How To Kill and Slaughter Daughter with two new additional tracks "Empty's Promise (Early Demo)" and a cover of the Beatsteaks song "Hand In Hand".

== Track listing ==
All songs written by Care Failure, except "Upside Down Cross" & "Fatherpunk" by Care Failure and Michael T. Fox.

1. "Do It or Die" – 3:36
2. "Saved By Strangers" – 3:24
3. "Upside Down Cross" – 3:55
4. "Lonely of a Woman" – 3:38
5. "Autumn Cannibalist" – 3:23
6. "Near the End" – 2:47
7. "Fatherpunk" – 3:13
8. "Donut Kill Self" – 4:31
9. "Empty's Promise" [Early Demo] – 5:11
10. "Hand In Hand" – 2:28
- Track 10 is "Open Season" on the American version.

== Personnel ==
Die Mannequin

- Care Failure – lead vocals, guitar, bass
- Anthony "Useless" Bleed – bass
- Pat M. – drums, percussion

Technical staff and artwork

- Tracks 1&2 Produced by Ian D'Sa
- Tracks 3&4 Produced by Junior Sanchez.
- Tracks 1&2 Recorded by Eric Ratz & Kenny Luong
- Tracks 3&4 Recorded by Ray Martin assisted by Jeff Pelletier
- Tracks 1–4 Mixed by Eric Ratz
- Tracks 5–8 Produced, recorded & mixed by MSTRKRFT
- Track 9 Recorded & mixed by Krisjan Leslie
- Track 9 Recorded & mixed by Eric Ratz & Kenny Luong
- Mastered by Noah Mintz
- Art by B. Bergerson & D. Appleby for Think Tank Creative
- Photography by Ivan Otis

== Release history ==
Country	Date
Canada	November 13, 2007
United States	March 4, 2008

== See also ==
Die Mannequin
