= Die Mannequin =

Canadian alternative rock band

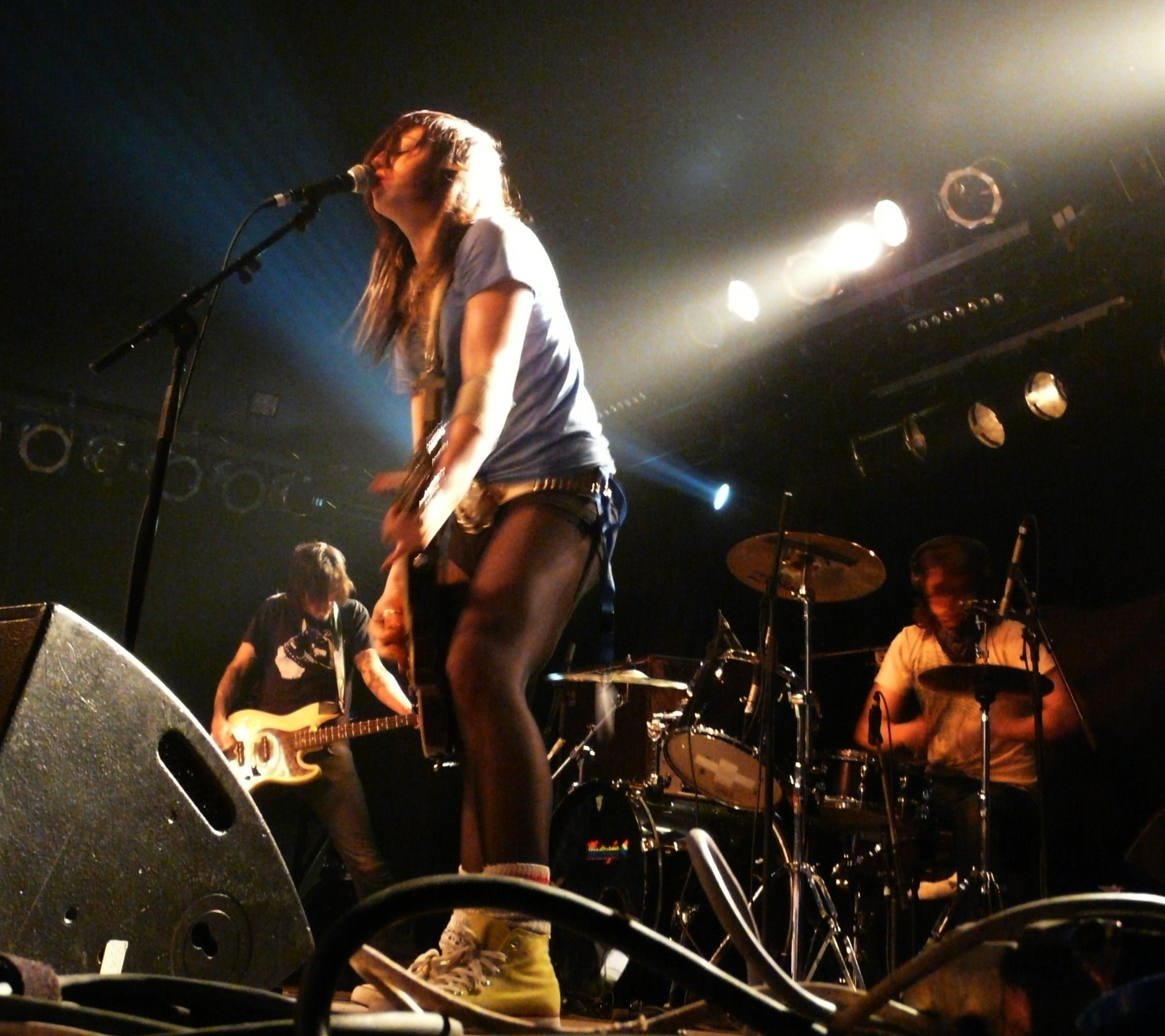
- Die Mannequin performing in 2008

Background information
- Origin: Toronto, Ontario, Canada
- Genres: Alternative rock
- Years active: 2005–2023
- Labels: eOne Music; How to Kill; Cordless
- Past members: Care Failure; Kevvy Mental; Keith Heppler; J.C. Sandoval; Anthony Bleed; Dazzer Scott; Stacy Stray; Ghostwolf; Ethan Kath
- Website: diemannequin.net

Die Mannequin was a Canadian alternative rock band from Toronto, founded by guitar player and singer Care Failure (born Caroline Slezak Kawa) in 2005. The band toured across Canada several times, opening for Buckcherry, Guns N' Roses, Marilyn Manson and Sum 41. They also toured Europe on several occasions, alone and as an opening act for Danko Jones in 2008.

== History ==
Originating from Care Failure's first four-piece band "The Bloody Mannequins", Die Mannequin started in the spring of 2006 when Failure recorded her first EP, How to Kill, on How To Kill Records/Cordless Recordings. She sang, played guitar and bass on this EP because she did not have a permanent backing band at that time. Death from Above 1979's Jesse F. Keeler took care of the drum duties as well as production. The EP featured four songs and was produced by Keeler and partner Al-P from MSTRKRFT and was mastered by Ryan Mills at Joao Carvalho Mastering. Care Failure was also a member of the supergroup The Big Dirty Band, which included members from the Canadian hard rock band Rush, amongst others. They have recorded a cover version and video of The Bobby Fuller Four song "I Fought The Law". This video also featured Anthony Useless, even though he did not play on any of the recordings. It was featured as a soundtrack to the 2006 movie Trailer Park Boys: The Movie.

Failure later hired two of her longtime friends, Ethan Deth (of Toronto band Kïll Cheerleadër) and Pat M. (a.k.a. Ghostwolf) to play bass and drums. Deth was quickly replaced by Anthony "Useless" Bleed, also from Kïll Cheerleadër. He played bass guitar and provided backing vocals. Managed by Shull Management, Die Mannequin signed with EMI Publishing in the summer of 2006, and began their own record label, How To Kill Records which is distributed by Warner Music Canada. They were booked as one of the opening bands for Guns N' Roses' eastern leg of their 2006 North-American tour.

Die Mannequin released a new EP in the fall of 2007 entitled Slaughter Daughter. Two tracks, "Do It Or Die" and "Saved By Strangers", were produced by Ian D'Sa of Billy Talent. The other two tracks, "Upside Down Cross" and "Lonely Of A Woman", were produced by Junior Sanchez. There was also a live recording of "Open Season" included on this EP. The band released a video for the first single, "Do it or Die", which entered rotation on Much Music and Much Loud.

Both EPs were collected on a single disc entitled Unicorn Steak which features two unreleased songs: an early demo of "Empty's Promise" and the cover of the Beatsteaks song "Hand in Hand". A video was also recorded after the release of Unicorn Steak, for the song "Saved By Strangers", directed by Canadian director Bruce McDonald. He also directed a documentary about Die Mannequin, entitled The Rawside of Die Mannequin, which premiered at Toronto's North By North East festival on June 15, 2008.

In 2009, Die Mannequin took part in a documentary series called City Sonic. The series, which featured 20 Toronto artists, had Care Failure reflecting on her memories of CFNY, 102.1 the Edge.

On September 8, 2009, Die Mannequin released FINO + BLEED, mixed by Mike Fraser.

In 2009, they opened for the Canadian dates of the Marilyn Manson's The High End of Low Tour.

On March 21, 2012, Die Mannequin announced on their website that they would be releasing new music in mid-April, along with a new single and music video. This coincided with the release of Hard Core Logo 2.

On August 20, 2014, the band released a single titled "Sucker Punch" for their upcoming album. Their second full-length album, Neon Zero, was released on October 28, 2014. Exclaim! magazine called it 'evil dance metal'.

On March 30, 2023, it was reported that Caroline Kawa (Care Failure) had died at the age of 36 due to multiple organ failure and heart failure caused by an infection.

In April 2024, a tribute to Care Failure took place at Toronto's Bovine Sex Club, called Failurefest. ACIIDZ, Fine Motor Control, Blackout Orchestra, Ian D'Sa, Kali-Ann Butala from Bad Waitress, Emily Bones and Valerie Knox of the Anti-Queens performed. The tribute benefitted the charity Sistering, where Failure had volunteered.

== Band members ==
Final lineup

- Caroline Slezak "Care Failure" Kawa – vocals, guitar, bass (2005–2023, her death)
- Keith Heppler – drums, percussion (2015–2023)
- J.C. Sandoval – guitar, backing vocals (2015–2023)
- Stephany Seki – bass, backing vocals (2018–2023)

Former

- Ethan Kath – bass (2006)
- Ghostwolf – drums, percussion (2006–2009)
- Anthony "Useless" Bleed – bass, backing vocals (2006–2014)
- Dazzer Scott – drums, percussion (2009–2014)
- Stacy Stray – guitar, backing vocals (2009–2014)
- Kevvy Mental – bass, backing vocals (2015–2018)

== Discography ==
=== Studio albums ===
- Fino + Bleed (2009)
- Neon Zero (2014)

=== EPs ===
- How to Kill (2006)
- Slaughter Daughter (2007)
- Danceland (2012) No. 76 CAN

=== Compilations ===
- Unicorn Steak (2008)

=== Soundtracks ===
Year	Album title	Track
2012	Hard Core Logo 2	"Do It or Die"
2012	Hard Core Logo 2	"Orson Wells + 2012"
2012	Hard Core Logo 2	"The Other Tiffany"
2012	Hard Core Logo 2	"Candide"

=== Singles ===
Year	Song	Chart peak		Album
Year	Song	CAN Alt	CAN Rock	Album
2006	"Autumn Cannibalist"	×	×	How to Kill
2008	"Do It or Die"	×	×	Unicorn Steak
2008	"Saved by Strangers"	×	×	Unicorn Steak
2009	"Bad Medicine"	11	—	Fino + Bleed
2009	"Dead Honey"	32	35	Fino + Bleed
2009	"Miss Americvnt"	—	—	Fino + Bleed
2012	"Orson Welles & 2012"	48	—	Danceland
2014	"Sucker Punch"	x	x	Neon Zero
"—" denotes a release that did not chart. "×" denotes periods where charts did not exist or were not archived.

== See also ==
- Music of Canada
- Canadian rock
- List of Canadian musicians
- List of bands from Canada
