= Fino + Bleed =

Studio album by Die Mannequin
- Released: September 8, 2009
- Genre: Alternative rock, punk rock, sleaze rock, glam punk
- Label: How To Kill
- Producer: Matt Hyde

Die Mannequin chronology
| Unicorn Steak (2007) | Fino + Bleed (2009) | Danceland (2012) |

Professional ratings
Review scores
| Source | Rating |
|---|---|
| TorontoMusicScene | 4.5/5 stars |

Fino + Bleed is a studio album by the Canadian punk rock band Die Mannequin, released on September 8, 2009. Fino + Bleed is Die Mannequin's first true studio album because their previously released studio album Unicorn Steak is a compilation of their first two EPs, How To Kill and Slaughter Daughter. There is also a deluxe CD/DVD version of the album with the DVD containing the Bruce McDonald directed The Raw Side of…Die Mannequin. The original release date was set for August 25, 2009 but was pushed back to September 8, 2009, in order to accommodate the addition of the documentary.

== Track listing ==
1. ""Intruder" Interlude" (Care Failure) - 1:34
2. "Miss Americvnt" (Care F./Harry Hess/Peter Lesperance) - 3:02
3. "Dead Honey" (Care F./Raine Maida/Chantal Kreviazuk) - 3:11
4. "Start It Up" (Care F./Jason "Space" Smith) - 3:06
5. "Suffer" (Care F.) - 2:42
6. "Bad Medicine" (Care F.) - 3:30
7. "Locking Elizabeth / "Fino + Bleed" Interlude" (Care F./Scott Cutler/Anne Preven) - 4:12
8. "Candide" (Care F./Anna Wayland) - 4:18
9. "Where Poppies Grow" (Care F.) - 3:09
10. "Caroline Mescaline / "Nobody's Graveyard, But Everyone's Skeleton" Interlude" (Care F./Hess) - 5:12
11. "Guns Not Bombs" (Care F./Space) - 3:37
12. "Open Season / "Whipper Snapper" Interlude" (Care F./Johnny Andrews) - 5:54

== Personnel ==
Die Mannequin

- Care Failure – guitar, lead vocals
- Anthony "Useless" Bleed – bass, vocals
- Jack Irons – drums

Technical staff and artwork

- Produced by Matt Hyde
- Recording engineer: Chris Rakestraw
- Mixed by Mike Fraser (Except "Intruder", "Fino + Bleed", "Nobody's Graveyard, But Everyone's Skeleton" and "Whipper Snapper" Interludes mixed by Matt Hyde)
- Assistant mix engineer: Eric Mosh
- Mastered by Tom Baker
- Art by Care Failure
- Cover photography by Alishia Fox
- Photography by David Waldman, Pete Nema, Willem Wernsen, Florian Kehbel and A.I.
