= Black History Month (song) =

Single by Death from Above 1979

from the album You're a Woman, I'm a Machine
- Released: June 13, 2005
- Genre: Dance-punk
- Label: 679
- Songwriter(s): Sebastien Grainger, Jesse F. Keeler
- Producer(s): Al-P

Death from Above 1979 singles chronology
"Blood on Our Hands" (2005)	"Black History Month" (2005)	"Trainwreck 1979" (2014)

"Black History Month" is the third single from Death from Above 1979's album You're a Woman, I'm a Machine. The song was given its title by drummer and vocalist Sebastien Grainger, simply because it was written in February. It reached number 48 on the UK single chart.

The song is also featured on the in-game soundtrack for Project Gotham Racing 3 for the Xbox 360. The b-side on the CD single, "Luno (Bloc Party vs. Death From Above 1979)" is a cover of the Bloc Party song, "Luno" from their debut album Silent Alarm. The Bloc Party vs. Death From Above 1979 version is included on Bloc Party's remix album, Silent Alarm Remixed.

== Track listing ==
CD:

1. "Black History Month" – 3:48
2. "Luno" (Bloc Party cover) – 3:54

7" #1:

1. "Black History Month" - 3:48
2. "Black History Month" (Sammy Danger Remix) - 4:04

7" #2:

1. "Black History Month" (Sammy Danger NLS Edit)
2. "Black History Month" (Alan Braxe & Fred Falke Remix) - 5:21
