= How to Kill =

How To Kill

EP by Die Mannequin
- Released: September 25, 2006
- Genres: Alternative rock, punk rock, glam punk
- Length: 13:52
- Label: How to Kill
- Producer: MSTRKRFT

Die Mannequin chronology
| How To Kill (2006) | Slaughter Daughter (2007) |

How To Kill is the first EP by the Canadian rock band Die Mannequin, released on September 25, 2006. Produced by electronic music group MSTRKRFT, How To Kill was the group's first release and because Care Failure had yet to put together a full-time band she performed the vocals, guitar and bass herself with the drums being handled by Jesse F. Keeler of MSTRKRFT and Death from Above 1979 fame.

== Track listing ==
All songs written by Care Failure, except "Fatherpunk" by Care Failure and Michael T. Fox.

1. "Autumn Cannibalist" – 3:23
2. "Near The End" – 2:47
3. "Fatherpunk" – 3:13
4. "Donut Kill Self" – 4:31

== Personnel ==
Die Mannequin

- Care Failure – lead vocals, guitar, bass
- Jesse F. Keeler – drums, percussion

Technical staff and artwork

- Recorded & Produced by MSTRKRFT.
- Art by Care Failure / Marc P.

== See also ==
Die Mannequin
