= Felix Cartal =

- Born: Taelor Deitcher; April 9, 1987 (age 39)
- Origin: New Westminster, British Columbia, Canada
- Genres: EDM, house, electro house
- Occupations: Producer, DJ, songwriter
- Instruments: Digital audio workstation, bass, piano
- Years active: 2006–present
- Labels: Universal Music Group, Dim Mak, Physical Presents
- Website: felixcartal.com

Taelor Deitcher (born April 9, 1987), better known by his stage name Felix Cartal, is a Canadian DJ and electronic dance music producer. He released his first EP Skeleton in 2009 once he signed with Dim Mak Records. Since then he has gone on to release five full-length albums, 2010's Popular Music, 2012's Different Faces, 2018's Next Season, 2021's Expensive Sounds for Nice People, and 2025's i, sabotage. Cartal has toured with Wolfgang Gartner, MSTRKRFT, and Bloody Beetroots. Cartal set the trend of collaborating with unpredictable vocalists in the dance scene such as Sebastien Grainger of Death from Above 1979, Maja Ivarsson of The Sounds and Johnny Whitney of The Blood Brothers.

== Early life ==
In 2000, Cartal attended New Westminster Secondary School in New Westminster, British Columbia. He began playing bass in the punk and hardcore scene with a band called Dysfunctional, named after a sticker they had found. Their musical style were inspired from groups such as Refused, NOFX and Anti-Flag. They had developed a small fanbase in North Vancouver and performed at venues before reforming into a more progressive, The Mars Volta/Pink Floyd-inspired group named Orange Orange, which broke up in 2006.

Following the group's disintegration, Cartal experimented with music production software such as Reason and Cubase. Influenced by the club nights and parties with local DJs, Cartal acknowledged the similarity of the punk and EDM scenes which prompted him to get involved into the EDM scene.

Cartal enrolled at the University of British Columbia where he majored in English. He moved to Scotland for a semester at University of Glasgow.

== Career ==
=== 2006–2010: Skeleton and Popular Music ===
In December 2006, he emerged on the international blog scene alongside MSTRKRFT with original songs such as Moss vs. Tree and Parisienne.

During his time in the UK, Cartal signed with a booking agent and started playing weekend shows across Britain and Europe. His third ever show was opening for Justice with an audience of over 4,000 people. By the time he returned to his hometown four months later, he was already an underground star. He opened for MSTRKRFT on their Fist of God tour. He released several more remixes before being signed to Steve Aoki's Dim Mak Records and released his first EP entitled Skeleton in May 2009.

Four months later, Cartal released Drone as the first single for his debut album Popular Music.

Popular Music was released on February 23, 2010. Along with Drone, the album featured the singles Volanco featuring The Blood Brothers' Johnny Whitney, World Class Driver and Love. Music videos for Volcano and World Class Driver were made. Cartal went on tours and performed at music festivals such as Electric Daisy Carnival, Camp Bisco, South by Southwest, and Winter Music Conference.

=== 2011–2012: Different Faces ===
In March 2011, Cartal released a single titled The Joker via Dim Mak Records. The song became one of Cartal's most notable work and was played in the live sets by notable DJs such as Benny Benassi, Laidback Luke and Diplo. After extensive touring, Cartal started working on his sophomore album which featured several guest vocalists and focused more on catchy melodies, yet still retained his trademark aggressive sound. His second album, Different Faces was released on March 27, 2012, and featured the singles Don't Turn on the Lights featuring Polina Goudieva, "Domo", "Black to White" featuring Miss Palmer, and H.U.N.T featuring Sebastien Grainger. Different Faces debuted on the iTunes Top 10 Electronic chart in North America.

Continuing his success, Cartal started a biweekly podcast entitled The Weekend Workout, a one-hour mix showcasing new electronic dance music including unreleased Cartal tracks. Starting in June 2012, it became a weekly mix broadcast worldwide on SiriusXM and available for free download on iTunes and SoundCloud. On July 25, 2012, a music video for Higher featuring New Ivory was released online.

On August 14, 2012, Cartal released the final single for Different Faces, Tonight featuring Maja Ivarsson of The Sounds, accompanied by an EP featuring remixes by Autoerotique, Botnek, and others. On December 4, 2012, Cartal released single No Sleep featuring Natalie Angiuli. On December 20, 2012, Lullaby featuring Natalie Angiuli was released as a free download for the B-side to the recently released single No Sleep.

=== 2013–2015: Past Present Felix ===
Constantly touring North America and Europe, Cartal released remixes for Zedd and The Bloody Beetroots. On January 22, 2013, he released a single titled The Alarm with Autoerotique.

Collaborating with Clockwork, Cartal released the single The Fire featuring Madame Buttons. He also produced a song for K.Flay titled Hail Mary featuring Danny Brown. On July 2, 2013, Cartal released Young Love (featuring Koko LaRoo) as the first single from his four-track EP titled Past Present Felix. On July 25, 2013, the music video for Young Love was released online. Past Present Felix was released August 6, 2013.

A 16-date headlining North American tour was announced in support of Past Present Felix through September and October 2013.

December 3, 2013 saw the release of New Scene featuring Ofelia as the final single from Past Present Felix. Following the release of the single, the music video premiered December 19, 2013, on MTVu. After a successful tour, Cartal released a three-song EP entitled Credits, featuring the lead single Ready for Love featuring Chloe Angelides, on April 29, 2014.

=== 2015–present: Remixes, collaborations, and a new sound ===
In 2015, Cartal signed with Universal Canada and released two singles: With You and Something To Live For. In early 2016, he showcased a new sound on remixes for Kiiara, Wafia, Anna of the North, and Selena Gomez. He then released a collaboration with Kaskade titled Fakin It and three original songs: Keep Up, Drifting Away, and Falling Down.

In March 2017, he released Get What You Give, a remix cover of the New Radicals song, which earned him his first certified Gold Record, followed by Hold Tight in September 2017. He then collaborated with R3hab on the track Killing Time.

==== Next Season ====
In May 2018, he released his third studio album, Next Season. Released by Canadian record label Physical Presents, the album featured the singles Runaway featuring Regn, Walking By featuring Iselin Solheim (mononymously known as Iselin), Faces featuring Veronica, and Worry featuring Victoria Zaro. Next Season received positive reviews from critics.

The album featured a number of co-writers, including Iselin Solheim, who is widely known for Alan Walker's E.D.M. singles Faded and Sing Me to Sleep, Ofelia, Veronica, Kriss and Erik, Moon Bounce, REGN, and Nate. In an interview with Billboard magazine, Cartal cited Shel Silverstein, Drake, M83, The Beatles, and even Simpson Wave internet content as sources of inspiration for the album.

==== Expensive Sounds for Nice People ====
In June 2021, Cartal released Expensive Sounds for Nice People, his fourth studio album. Like Next Season, the album was released by Canadian record label Physical Presents. The album features singles Love Me with Lights, Over It featuring Veronica, Mine with Sophie Simmons, Harmony, which is co-written by Maia Wright and Sebastien Daniel, Happy Hour with Kiiara, Only One featuring Karen Harding, My Last Song with Hanne Mjøen, and The Life with Fjord.

== Discography ==
=== Studio albums ===
- Popular Music (2010)
- Different Faces (2012)
- Next Season (2018)
- Expensive Sounds for Nice People (2021)
- I, Sabotage (2025)
