= 2K15 =

2K15 may refer to:

- the year 2015
- NBA 2K15, 2014 video game
- WWE 2K15, 2014 video game
