= Seripop =

Canadian art duo

Seripop refers to the art duo Chloe Lum and Yannick Desranleau, who have collaborated on album covers, concert posters, book illustrations, and installations. The name Seripop is short for Serigraphie Populaire, French for "Popular Screenprinting". Seripop was long based in Montreal, Quebec, Canada. In 2024, Lum and Desranleau moved to Edmonton, Alberta to begin teaching at the University of Alberta.

== Biographies ==
Lum and Desranleau met in the underground noise music scene of Montreal, eventually forming their first band Electric End. They began making their hand-printed posters as a way to attract people to their shows, but then eventually dropped out of art school in the early 2000s to make tour posters for six bands' entire tours, resulting in 25 to 45 posters for each band. Both are graduates of Montreal's Concordia University. The two are also members of noise rock quartet, AIDS Wolf, which has since stopped playing shows.

== Exhibitions ==
What Do Stones Smell Like in the Forest? – Latitude 53, Edmonton, Canada

MAC Collection: Chloë Lum & Yannick Desranleau – Musée d'art contemporain de Montréal, Canada. Curator: Marie-Eve Beaupré.

The Face Stayed East and the Mouth Went West (elements) at Galerie Hugues Charbonneau

Certainty: Two Times Not Really at Struts Gallery

== Awards ==
They won the 2007 Juno Award for CD/DVD Artwork Design of the Year for designing the cover of The Looks album by MSTRKRFT.
