= Operator (album) =

Studio album by Mstrkrft
- Released: July 22, 2016
- Genre: Electro house
- Length: 43:13
- Label: Last Gang
- Producer: Mstrkrft

Mstrkrft chronology
Fist of God (2009)	Operator (2016)

Singles from Operator
- 1. "Little Red Hen" Released: March 6, 2016; 2. "Party Line" Released: May 13, 2016; 3. "Priceless" Released: June 9, 2016; 4. "Runaway" Released: July 20, 2016

Operator is the third studio album by Canadian electronic music duo Mstrkrft. It was released on July 22, 2016, by Last Gang Records.

== Promotion ==
The album's first single "Little Red Hen" featured on Canadian DJ A-Trak's Beats 1 (now Apple Music 1) radio program on March 5, 2006.

The band performed six songs from the album on CBC Music's First Play Live program on July 29, 2016.

== Release ==
On May 13, 2016, the band announced they were releasing their third studio album. Jesse F. Keeler said of the album:

"The Operator concept for us was essential in the creation of the music on this album, but I’m not sure what came first, the title or the idea. While browsing military related websites and blogs, mostly consisting of vets talking to each other like any civilian I suppose, I noticed repeated reference to something they called "operator culture". As we had decided to work entirely with hardware, all our old drum machines and modular synth collection, we had begun to feel more like operators than musicians"

=== Singles ===
On March 6, 2016, Mstrkrft released "Little Red Hen", the band's first song in five years.

The second single "Party Line" was released on May 13, 2016, alongside the announcement of the album. The official music video, released on May 26, 2016, was directed by Brooks Reynolds and produced by Joe McLaren.

The third single "Priceless" was released on June 9, 2016, and features English musician Sonny Kay. The music video, released on July 9, 2016, was directed by Nick Sewell.

On July 20, 2016, the band released their fourth single "Runaway".

== Tour ==
In support of the album, the band went on a North American tour from June 1, 2016, at the U Street Music Hall in Washington, D.C. to June 14, 2016, at The Horseshoe Tavern in Ontario, Canada.

== Critical reception ==
Professional ratings
Aggregate scores
Source	Rating
AnyDecentMusic?	5.3/10
Metacritic	55/100
Review scores
Source	Rating
AllMusic	3.5/5 stars
Clash	8/10
Consequence of Sound	C−
DIY	3/5 stars
Drowned in Sound	5/10
Exclaim	7/10
Pitchfork	6.5/10
PopMatters	2/10

Operator was met with "mixed or average" reviews from critics. At Metacritic, which assigns a weighted average rating out of 100 to reviews from mainstream publications, this release received an average score of 55 based on 18 reviews. At AnyDecentMusic?, the release was given a 5.3 out of 10 based on a critical consensus of 22 reviews.

Writing for AllMusic, Neil Z. Yeung said the release was the "most difficult listen to date, droning with hypnotic repetition and no outright bangers." He went on to say, "Much of the fun is also gone and listeners are ushered from the EDM arena and into the shadowy back room for much of this affair." Josh Gray at Clash said: "Operator boasts by far the most aggressive, noise-ridden collection of tracks the pair have ever managed to grind out. MSTRKRFT themselves have quit trying to mask anything about their sound or approach, electing instead to deliver the turbo-aggressive noise record they’ve always threatened to make." Kyle Eustice of Consequence of Sound explained: "Operator drags the listener kicking and screaming into what sounds like the soundtrack to the depths of hell, where the only music available is an unrelenting, want-to-bang-your-head-against-the-wall symphony of noise. It's difficult not to imagine Keeler dropping several hits of acid and then zoning out with his synthesizers and 808s. Operator is overpowering enough to make a casual listen impossible and an intense listen painful."

== Track listing ==
All tracks are written by Jesse F. Keeler and Al-P.

Operator track listing
No.	Title	Length
1.	"Wrong Glass Sir"	5:01
2.	"Runaway"	3:30
3.	"Little Red Hen"	4:16
4.	"Priceless"	3:26
5.	"Playing with Itself"	5:44
6.	"Party Line"	4:20
7.	"Death in the Gulf Stream"	4:20
8.	"World Peace"	3:30
9.	"Morning of the Hunt"	4:48
10.	"Go on Without Me"	4:23
Total length:		43:13

== Charts ==
Chart performance for Operator
Chart (2016)	Peak position
US Top Dance Albums (Billboard)	17

== Release history ==
Release history for Operator
Region	Date	Format	Label	Ref.
Various	22 July 2016	Digital download	Last Gang Records	
Various	22 July 2016	CD	Last Gang Records	
Various	22 July 2016	Vinyl	Last Gang Records	
