= Heads Up (Death from Above EP) =

EP by Death from Above
- Released: December 15, 2002
- Recorded: September 11, 2001 – September 11, 2002
- Studio: Kimagure Sound
- Genres: Dance-punk; noise rock
- Length: 13:51
- Label: Ache
- Producer: Al-P

Death from Above chronology
Heads Up (2002)	You're a Woman, I'm a Machine (2004)

Heads Up is the first studio release by Canadian rock duo Death from Above. It was released December 15, 2002, through Ache Records. The album was produced by Al-P who would later work alongside Jesse F. Keeler in the electronic music duo MSTRKRFT.

== Background ==
Allmusic states the band takes cues from bands such as Lightning Bolt, Liars, and electroclash and describes the album as "minimalist, danceable racket with enough rock sensibilities for the indie kids and enough Throbbing Gristle for the art-noise lovers."

The song "Dead Womb" is notable for the intro with an electronic voice saying: "La cocaina no es buena para su salud (Translation: Cocaine is not good for your health) La cocaina is not good for you." Before the song dive bombs into a punk sounding song. Sebastien Grainger actually said the intro was an old text-to-voice program on one of his older computers that did that voice. Apparently the program had weird choices like "little boy" and such, and it just stuck. This electronic voice intro was sampled in the Crystal Castles song "Untrust Us".

== Critical reception ==
Professional ratings
Review scores
Source	Rating
AbsolutePunk.net	83%
AllMusic	3.5/5 stars
Fakejazz	8/12 stars
Punknews.org	4.5/5 stars
Semtex Magazine	8/10 stars

Tyler of Punknews.org concluded his review of the album saying "If you are looking for something fresh, raw, energetic and also unbelievably good to go running to, then get a "heads up" on this record immediately." He also compared the tracks to "techno-style sounds of synthesizer" and "blistering dance-punk"

== Track listing ==
No.	Title	Length
1.	"Dead Womb"	2:06
2.	"Too Much Love"	1:48
3.	"Do It!"	2:30
4.	"My Love Is Shared"	1:51
5.	"Losing Friends"	3:01
6.	"If We Don't Make It, We'll Fake It"	2:36

== Personnel ==
Album personnel as listed in the 2005 reissue CD liner notes.

Death from Above

- Jesse F. Keeler – bass, vocoder, additional percussion, additional vocals, Illustration
- Sebastien Grainger – drums, vocals, additional percussion, additional vocals

Additional personnel

- Al-P – recording, additional percussion, additional vocals, layout
