= Free Life =

Free Life may refer to:

- Free Life (album), a 2007 album by Dan Wilson
- Free Life (balloon), a Rozière balloon that crashed in 1970 while attempting to cross the Atlantic Ocean
- The Free Life (album), a 2018 album by Turbowolf
- Free Life, a former print journal published by the Libertarian Alliance
- Free Life, a short-lived soul/R&B group from 1978 produced by Philip Bailey of Earth, Wind & Fire
- FreeLife, an American multi-level marketing company that sells nutritional products
