= Chemical Sound =

Recording studio in Toronto, Ontario, Canada

Chemical Sound was a recording studio located in Toronto, Ontario, Canada. Established in 1992, at 81 Portland Street by Murray B Mitchell artist, producer and producer engineer, Daryl Smith (often assisted by Ian Blurton), as a "no-frills" operation, focusing on a large selection of vintage (circa 1960 and 1970s) recording equipment, API mixing consoles, and professional resources necessary for a best outcome. The tube mics, live room, sound formant, and burlap baffled walls were some of the expertise. Clients at that time included Nelly Furtado, Joan Osborne, Noel Ellis, Daniel Lanois, Peter Moore, Our Lady Of Peace, Rusty, Sucker Punch, Big Sugar, Boot Sauce, Bare Naked Ladies, Starvin Hungry, Big Wreck and more.

The studio's original location was razed, making way for a real estate development and condominium project. The studio subsequently relocated to Riverdale, Toronto, eventually acquired by Dean Marino and Jay Sadlowski. In February 2012, Chemical Sound announced it was closing its operation but would honor bookings already scheduled.

== Selected discography ==
The following releases were recorded at Chemical Sound:

- Born Ruffians, Red, Yellow & Blue (2008)
- Constantines, Shine a Light (2003)
- Death from Above 1979, You're a Woman, I'm a Machine (2004)
- Elevator Through, Vague Premonition (1999)
- Godspeed You! Black Emperor, Lift Your Skinny Fists Like Antennas to Heaven (2000)
- Raising the Fawn, Sleight of Hand (2007)
- Sarah Slean, Night Bugs (2002)
- Sloan, Between the Bridges (1999)
- Sloan, Navy Blues (1998)
- Tokyo Police Club, Elephant Shell (2008)
- Mystery, The World is a Game (2012) (Drum tracks)
- 4 Star Movie, 4 Star Movie (Recorded in 1997/Released in 1998)
- Perm, Customized Gold (1995)
- The Flashing Lights, Where The Change Is (1999)
