= Two Hands (Turbowolf album) =

Studio album by Turbowolf
- Released: 6 April 2015
- Genre: Hard rock, stoner rock
- Length: 38:33
- Label: Spinefarm, Search and Destroy Records
- Producer: Tom Dalgety

Turbowolf chronology
| Turbowolf (2012) | Two Hands (2015) | The Free Life (2018) |

Professional ratings
Aggregate scores
| Source | Rating |
|---|---|
| Metacritic | 80/100 |
Review scores
| Source | Rating |
| Classic Rock | 3.5/5 stars |
| Kerrang! | 4/5 stars |
| Metal Hammer | 3.5/5 stars |
| PopMatters | 3.5/5 stars |
| The Sydney Morning Herald | 4/5 stars |
| Sputnikmusic | 4/5 stars |

Two Hands is the second studio album by English hard rock band Turbowolf. It was produced by Tom Dalgety and released through Spinefarm Records/Search and Destroy Records on 6 April 2015.

== Track listing ==
| No. | Title | Length |
|---|---|---|
| 1. | "Invisible Hand" | 2:37 |
| 2. | "Rabbits Foot" | 2:44 |
| 3. | "Solid Gold" | 4:38 |
| 4. | "American Mirrors" | 2:42 |
| 5. | "Toy Memaha" (instrumental) | 0:44 |
| 6. | "Nine Lives" | 3:09 |
| 7. | "Good Hand" | 2:58 |
| 8. | "MK Ultra" | 2:18 |
| 9. | "Twelve Houses" | 4:52 |
| 10. | "Rich Gift" | 6:47 |
| 11. | "Pale Horse" | 5:04 |

== Chart positions ==
| Chart (2015) | Peak position |
|---|---|
| UK Albums (OCC) | 70 |
| UK Rock & Metal Albums (OCC) | 4 |
