= Sebastien Grainger & The Mountains =

Studio album by Sebastien Grainger
- Released: October 21, 2008
- Genre: Indie rock
- Label: Saddle Creek

Sebastien Grainger chronology
American Names (2008)	Sebastien Grainger & The Mountains (2008)

Professional ratings
Aggregate scores
Source	Rating
Metacritic	6.2/10 link
Review scores
Source	Rating
Spin	link
Pitchfork Media	5.8/10 link

Sebastien Grainger & The Mountains is the debut solo album by Sebastien Grainger. The album was originally released in 2008.

== Track listing ==
1. "Love Can Be So Mean" – 3:26
2. "Who Do We Care For?" – 2:28
3. "By Cover of Night (Fire Fight)" – 3:47
4. "I'm All Rage (Live '05)" – 4:12
5. "I Hate My Friends" – 4:32
6. "(Are There) Ways to Come Home?" – 4:03
7. "Niagara" – 1:28
8. "(I Am Like A) River" – 4:30
9. "Love Is Not a Contest" – 2:38
10. "American Names" – 4:12
11. "Meet New Friends" – 5:13
12. "Renegade Silence" (feat. The Rhythm Method) – 3:38

== Personnel ==
- Sebastien Grainger
- Nick Sewell
- Leon Taheny
- Andrew Scott
