= NBA 2K16 =

2015 video game

- The Stephen Curry version of NBA 2K16's cover
- Developer: Visual Concepts
- Publisher: 2K
- Director: Spike Lee
- Composers: DJ Khaled; DJ Mustard; DJ Premier
- Series: NBA 2K
- Platforms: Windows; PlayStation 3 PlayStation 4 Xbox 360; Xbox One; Android iOS
- Release: Windows, PlayStation 3, PlayStation 4, Xbox 360, Xbox One: WW: September 29, 2015; Android, iOS: WW: October 14, 2015
- Genre: Sports
- Modes: Single-player, multiplayer

NBA 2K16 is a 2015 basketball video game developed by Visual Concepts and published by 2K. It is the 17th installment in the NBA 2K franchise and the successor to NBA 2K15, while also being the predecessor of NBA 2K17. It was released on September 29, 2015, for Microsoft Windows, Xbox One, Xbox 360, PlayStation 4, and PlayStation 3. A mobile version for Android and iOS was released on October 14, 2015. There are three different covers for the main game, one featuring Anthony Davis of the New Orleans Pelicans, another featuring Stephen Curry of the Golden State Warriors, and the last featuring James Harden of the Houston Rockets. A special edition version of the game was also released; it features Michael Jordan on the cover.

NBA 2K16 simulates the experience of the National Basketball Association. Players play NBA games with real or created players and teams in various game modes, such as MyCareer, MyTeam, and standard games. Players may play regular season NBA games, playoff games, Summer League games, and others. Apart from the NBA, EuroLeague teams are also featured, thus simulating the EuroLeague. Players may create their own player and take them through a basketball career with the central goal of being the greatest basketball player of all time. The game offers many customization options for the player; the player may customize the physical appearance, attributes, and skill set of any player. Players may also create, build, and customize their own teams. The soundtrack was curated by DJ Premier, DJ Mustard, and DJ Khaled. It consists of 50 different songs.

Director Spike Lee was heavily involved in the development of the game's MyCareer mode. Lee's goal was to create a more story-focused MyCareer mode than previous installments. Lee worked with real world basketball players, following them and documenting their experience in high school and college competition, in an effort to more accurately depict the lifestyle of real professional basketball players. Several improvements and new additions were made to NBA 2K16, such as full body scanning, and overall aesthetic improvements. Several versions of the game were released, such as a special edition, which includes several physical and digital extras. If players pre-ordered the game, they received it on September 25, 2015. Players were also able to download a companion app called MyNBA2K16 which allows the player to earn in-game currency among other things.

NBA 2K16 was met with widespread acclaim upon release. Many critics praised the overall presentation and gameplay, as well as the large amount of content, the new features, and the developers' ability to still introduce positive changes after many previous installments. However, some critics still experienced online technical issues, while others heavily criticized the MyCareer mode for being far too restrictive. Some critics also felt that changing the controls was unnecessary and criticized the lack of tutorials and the presence of microtransactions. NBA 2K16 shipped over 4 million copies in its first week, making it the fastest selling game in the series.

== Gameplay ==
NBA 2K16 is a basketball simulation video game based on the National Basketball Association. Like past games in the series, NBA 2K16 simulates the experience of the NBA. Players play NBA games with any real life or custom team, and can customize many aspects, such as camera angles, the presentation of players, the sound levels, and the level of realism. Like other NBA 2K games, NBA 2K16 is marketed as being as realistic as the actual NBA, with all the things featured in NBA games, such as commentary, pre-game shows, halftime shows, post-game shows, replays, interviews, crowds, and real player movement, among many other things. The pre-game, halftime, and post-game shows are hosted by Ernie Johnson with punditry from Shaquille O'Neal and Kenny Smith. Meanwhile, the game commentary is performed by Kevin Harlan with Clark Kellogg and Greg Anthony, while Doris Burke is the sideline reporter. The game features several online and offline game modes where players can play alone against the CPU, or against other players online.

NBA 2K16, like past games in the series, was marketed as being 'better' than the predecessor, as many features were added and improved upon. One such improvement, is the tattoos; when creating a player, there are over 1500 different designs available, whereas past games only had a few dozen individual tattoos. Other things that are touted as being improved are the visuals, the player customization (haircuts, accessories, etc.), several of the game modes (particularly MyCareer, which is marketed as a central feature), and the overall gameplay. Many aesthetical improvements are made as well, such as new animations, and redesigned menus. New animations include mouth guards, and photobombs.

Along with the current real world teams, such as the Oklahoma City Thunder and the Brooklyn Nets, and the Classic teams (first introduced in NBA 2K11) that have been featured before, like the 1985–86 Boston Celtics and the 1995–96 Chicago Bulls, 12 new Classic teams are introduced in NBA 2K16. The 1999–2000 Toronto Raptors, featuring Vince Carter and Tracy McGrady, the 2000–01 Los Angeles Lakers, featuring Shaquille O'Neal and Kobe Bryant, the 2002–03 Dallas Mavericks, featuring Steve Nash and Dirk Nowitzki, and the 2007–08 Boston Celtics, featuring Paul Pierce, Kevin Garnett, and Ray Allen, are some of the new Classic teams. The EuroLeague teams, first featured in NBA 2K14, return for the third time. Some of the 25 EuroLeague teams include Olympiacos Piraeus, Panathinaikos Athens, Maccabi Tel Aviv, Real Madrid, Alba Berlin, and CSKA Moscow.

NBA 2K16, for the fourth time in the series, features MyTeam mode. MyTeam mode was first introduced in NBA 2K13, and is based around the idea of building the ultimate basketball team, and maintaining a virtual trading card collection. Players build their own custom team, selecting the players, current and past, jerseys, coach, court, and other basketball related things, and play with their team in basketball tournament-style competitions against other players' teams. Players collect cards that unlock players, playbooks, and other items that can be used in their team or sold. Players purchase card packs with Virtual Currency (VC) which gives the player random items. Starting NBA 2K16, cards have different levels that are indicated by their overall rating including: Bronze, Silver, Gold, Amethyst, and Diamond. A player will commonly receive Bronze cards if they purchase cheaper card packs. However, if the player purchases high priced packs, the chances of getting Gold cards are higher. There are also rare cards, such as Amethyst and Diamond cards, that are rarer and better than other cards. The level of a card isn't always the most important factor as the abilities of the actual player, and their rating indicating how good they are, is most often more important. Players can freely customize their team on the fly; players may change the coach, players, jerseys, and anything else at any time. Customization aspects were touted as being the major improvements for the mode.

In addition to the MyTeam team customization, players may create their own brand new team from scratch and play 5-on-5 games against other players and their teams online, in the 2K Pro-Am game mode. Similar to previous games' Crew mode, players customize team logos, colour schemes, court designs, jersey styles, and certain other basketball related aspects. Players can create a variety of designs and themes; for example, the player has the ability to create the logos of past NBA teams, such as the Seattle SuperSonics, or create a team which features logos that consists of individual players. Unlike other game modes, Pro-Am teams consists exclusively of MyPlayers. Players may also play 5-on-5 games against other players using regular teams. Regular online games are played in a mode called Play Now. In Play Now, the player essentially levels up as they win games and move through the online ranks.

Also returning in NBA 2K16 is the MyCareer mode; MyCareer is a story-driven campaign that first appeared in NBA 2K10. The story is called Livin' Da Dream and focuses on an up-and-coming basketball prospect. The story starts with the player in high-school, but the player eventually enters college and then the NBA. Players create their basketball player, giving basic information, such as height, weight, position, background information, and name. (Even though the player may choose a name and some background details, the character is mostly referred to as "Frequency Vibrations" and has an African American family. Certain other details about the character are also not customizable, such as the player's personality and birthplace. The character is from Harlem, New York and had an underprivileged upbringing.) Players follow the story of being a basketball player as they upgrade their player's abilities with the ultimate goal of becoming one of the greatest basketball players of all time. The mode has a more cinematic presentation than previous games, with more cutscenes and stories. The player character enters the NBA via the draft, but not before playing for the college of their choosing. The player character quickly draws attention for his on-court and off-court actions, as he continues his journey towards superstardom. Players play basketball games in the NBA, interact with other players, which may result in friendship or rivalry, coaches, members of the media, and fans, negotiate contracts, appear in endorsement deals, practice in gyms, upgrade their player's abilities, customize their player's skill set, and customize their player's physical appearance. The player's central hub is a practice arena called MyCourt. As well as upgrading their player and practicing (etc.), the player may customize their court and invite other players to their court to participate in pick-up games, among other activities. The player can also take their MyPlayer to MyPark and play street basketball pick-up games against other players and their MyPlayer. Returning from NBA 2K15, players may scan their own face into the game.

The MyGM mode returns as well. Instead of only playing with the teams, players customize all the aspects of one team as they are essentially the boss of the entire organization. Players sign new players, complete trades, negotiate contracts with players or coaches, customize prices, add features to the arena, provide better facilities for the players, maintain a good relationship with the team owner, the players, media members, and fans, make a profit, and guide the team to NBA championships. Prior to release, the MyGM mode was said to have been drastically improved, with many new features having been added. For instance, players may relocate their team to a different North American city, a first for an NBA 2K game. Other additions include redesigned draft presentations, more off-season activities, the ability to customize arenas and jerseys, players that can have multiple injuries at once, three-team trades, and a mini game the player may play while simulating games, to give the player interactivity during simulations.

MyLeague mode is touted as a "sandbox" version of MyGM and is more similar to previous games' Association mode. MyLeague features most features in MyGM in that the player controls an NBA organization, customizing basketball aspects, and making money. However, MyLeague features more online multiplayer components, whereas MyGM is single-player only, and has similar customization options to MyTeam. MyLeague features more customization options than MyGM and removes certain 'rules' to allow flexibility for the player. For example, the player can freely relocate their team, trade players, change team aesthetics, and purchase upgrades without restrictions. The player may enter a MyLeague association made up of 30 user-controlled teams, instead of one user- and 29 CPU-controlled teams.

== Development ==
Director Spike Lee was involved in the development of the game. Lee is the director, writer, and co-producer of NBA 2K16's MyCareer mode. A "Spike Lee Joint", Lee said of working on the game: "We follow a kid through the trials and tribulations of being a top high school player and the decisions he has to make." Lee also said the experience of video game development was "unique", and stated that he felt he could "push the boundaries of innovative storytelling". 2K spokesperson Ryan Peters said: "We just told Spike, 'You transform the narrative, and we'll change that into digital polygons.' And he did that, bringing a protagonist and antagonist to the story." The cover states "Be The Story" and features pictures of the cover athletes from early in their respective careers, both emphasising the game's MyCareer mode.

In an effort to make the game look more realistic, many of the real players in the game had their entire body scanned into the game, as opposed to just the face like in previous NBA 2K games. A first for the NBA 2K series, the full body scanning allows the entire body of a specific player to be uniquely different from any other body. In previous NBA 2K games, a player's face was unique, while the body was generic and predefined. The full body scanning improves details in players' tattoos as well, something that has been criticized in past NBA 2K games. Cheerleaders, coaches, and fans were also scanned into the game; the designs of cheerleaders, coaches, and the crowd have too been criticized in past games.

DJ Premier, DJ Mustard, and DJ Khaled curated NBA 2K16's soundtrack. The soundtrack features 50 different songs, more than any other NBA 2K game. The soundtrack consists of six playlists: one compiled by each of the curators, one that contains songs that aren't necessarily in English, another that contains songs from past NBA 2K games, and a master playlist that contains all songs. Most songs are licensed for the game but several were created exclusively for the soundtrack. Players can select a playlist or create their own.

During broadcasts of the 2015 NBA Finals, the first trailers for the game were shown. The trailers are called "Story is Everything" and feature Lee discussing and highlighting the game's MyCareer mode. NBA 2K16 was featured at the 2015 Electronic Entertainment Expo; the same trailers were shown. Extended featurettes of the game were shown at Gamescom 2015. Many of the game's aspects were shown, including the MyTeam, MyGm, and MyCareer modes, as well as some online features.

The first official gameplay screenshots were revealed in August 2015. A second official trailer, titled "Beyond the Shadows", was released on August 10, 2015; it features Spike Lee narrating a summary of Stephen Curry's basketball career, and showcases some gameplay footage. Another trailer, titled "James Harden: Believe", was released on August 13, 2015. Similar to the Curry "Beyond the Shadows" trailer, "James Harden: Believe" is again narrated by Spike Lee, but focuses on James Harden's basketball career. A trailer about Anthony Davis' basketball career was released on August 20, 2015. The trailer is titled "Rise" and is narrated by Spike Lee once again.

An extended gameplay trailer was released on August 24, 2015. It features over two minutes of gameplay and teases the presence of college basketball teams. Another gameplay trailer, titled "Living World", was released on September 2, 2015; it features several of the game's developers discussing the improved presentation. A trailer called "Livin' Da Dream" was released on September 14, 2015. It extensively showcases the MyCareer mode. A promotional trailer called "Be Yourself" was released on September 22, 2015. Several other promotional trailers were also released, including "The Whole Story", a trailer focusing on MyCareer mode, which also confirmed the presence of college teams.

An NBA 2K16 launch party was held on September 22, 2015. It welcomed fans and media members — as well as the main three cover athletes, Spike Lee, Shaquille O'Neal, Ernie Johnson, some of the game's developers, and others — to play the game and conduct interviews.

== Release ==
NBA 2K16 was released worldwide on September 29, 2015, for the Microsoft Windows, PlayStation 3, PlayStation 4, Xbox 360, and Xbox One video gaming platforms. A mobile version for Android and iOS was also released on October 14, 2015. If players pre-ordered the game, they received it on September 25, 2015, four days earlier than those who chose not to pre-order. Players also received several in-game bonuses for pre-ordering the game. If players purchase the special edition of the game, they receive the Michael Jordan cover, several physical items, such as a poster, and many in-game bonuses.

A companion app for iOS and Android devices was released alongside NBA 2K16 on October 1, 2015. Titled MyNBA2K16, the companion app was developed by Cat Daddy Games and allows the player to manage various aspects and participate in various games that all tie into the main game. The player may earn VC for use in the main game, purchase accessories and other items for use in the main game, view several statistics, manage their MyTeam, interact with other players, and manage their MyPlayer, among other things. The companion app's cover athlete is Paul George of the Indiana Pacers.

When players purchase the retail version of the main game, they receive one of three different cover arts; distributed randomly, players will receive a cover featuring either Anthony Davis of the New Orleans Pelicans, Stephen Curry of the Golden State Warriors, or James Harden of the Houston Rockets. Although, a foldable insert featuring the other cover athletes is also included, effectively allowing the player to choose their preferred cover. If players purchase the special edition of the game, they will receive the Michael Jordan cover. Copies of NBA 2K16 in France feature Tony Parker of the San Antonio Spurs as the lone cover athlete, while Germany's copies feature Dennis Schröder of the Atlanta Hawks, and Spain's version features Marc Gasol of the Memphis Grizzlies, and Pau Gasol of the Chicago Bulls. This is the first time multiple covers of an NBA 2K game have been available since NBA 2K12 when Hall of Fame players Magic Johnson, Michael Jordan, and Larry Bird were one of the three cover athletes.

== Reception ==
Reception

Aggregate score
Aggregator	Score
Metacritic	(PS4) 87/100 (XOne) 86/100

Review scores
Publication	Score
Electronic Gaming Monthly	9.0/10
Game Informer	9/10
GameRevolution	4/5
GameSpot	8/10
GamesRadar+	4.5/5
GameTrailers	8.5/10
IGN	9.0/10
Hardcore Gamer	3.5/5

NBA 2K16 received "generally favorable" reviews from critics, according to review aggregator Metacritic which gave the game a score of 86/100 from 10 critics for the Xbox One version, and 87/100 from 42 critics for the PlayStation 4 version.

Jeff Landa gave the game a positive review for Electronic Gaming Monthly. He scored it a 9.0/10, praised the overall presentation and gameplay, and stated: "Games like NBA 2K16 will tend to overreach in how it chooses to occupy your time outside of the virtual arena. This is where most players will find the fault with 2K16, as not every mode external to game time is as fleshed out or competent as the main course. Not every returning 2K player will welcome the minor adjustments to the control scheme. Some online hiccups will frustrate others, and the addition of a MyCareer that doesn't always feel like yours will split many down the middle. Still, NBA 2K16 remains a refined technical masterpiece that rewards rookies and veterans alike with a showcase that belongs in the basketball hall-of-fame."

Game Informer's Matt Bertz awarded the game a 9 out of 10, concluding: "NBA 2K16 is the first true classic sports game of this console generation. I can only hope other sports games follow Visual Concepts' steadfast dedication to innovating on both the gameplay and game mode fronts." Bertz praised the MyCareer acting, commentary, the visuals, calling it the "best-looking sports game ever made", the "ambitious" changes and "innovations", the "stellar" gameplay, and the depth, saying the game "offers the most value you'll find in a sports game".

Devin Charles of Game Revolution gave the game a positive review. He scored it a 4.0 out of 5, and praised the "fantastic" presentation, the amount of depth, the "great" soundtrack, and the involvement of Spike Lee. Charles did feel as though the controls could have been better and disliked the dialogue in MyCareer mode. Charles concluded his review by saying: "[NBA 2K16 is] possibly the most complete game to the series. Truly when picking a title for yourself it's all about your preference. I actually like NBA Live 16's Pro-Am more, yet I like the way 2K16 presents its product on and off the court. Having options like playing with old-school teams and players further keeps fans interested. [...] 2K Sports rarely take a step back and this year is no different."

Josiah Renaudin from GameSpot gave the game an 8/10 and wrote: "NBA 2K16 draws you in with its welcoming personality and expanded game modes. But it still manages to push you away with unexplained intricacies. A deep tutorial would have gone a long way toward making the new passing and screening maneuvers easier to incorporate into your game, and at this point, it's inexcusable that this game still struggles online. Still, the fact that NBA 2K16 is a great basketball experience can't be ignored. Few sports games come close to providing a more authentic and fun virtual representation of the real thing, and even if this is the least user-friendly entry in years, I can't stop playing it."

GamesRadar's Rich Grisham scored the game a 4.5 out of 5, and wrote: "NBA 2K16 is absolutely brimming with content; so much so that it's virtually impossible to experience it all. Its core basketball experience is spectacular, and it takes big chances with an expansive story mode, a multitude of online options, and a presentation that is second to none in the sports game space. The only lingering doubt is its ability to keep its online infrastructure up and running from Day One, as many of the game's features are tied to the 2K servers being operational. It's the most ambitious sports game ever made, and a must-play for anyone who's ever picked up a virtual basketball."

Michael Huber from GameTrailers scored the game an 8.5 out if 10, and wrote: "Visual Concepts has done a commendable job with just one year of development. NBA 2K16 boasts many on-court improvements over last year, most notably on defensive that help create a better flow during games. Although the microtransactions devalue certain aspects of the game, and Pro-AM has connection issues, the on-court changes and additions are worth checking out for basketball enthusiasts."

In his review, IGN's Mike Mitchell scored the game a 9.0 out of 10, and stated: "NBA 2K16 is one of the most complete packages I've ever seen. Developer Visual Concepts continues to raise the sports simulation bar by completely retooling its silky-smooth gameplay, adding brand-new physics systems, and refining its traditional game modes. Not all of the changes work as well as others, most notably the Spike Lee-themed MyCareer mode, but it doesn't take away from the impressive overall package." Mitchell praised the overall gameplay, the AI, the online stability, the depth, and the customization options.

Matt Whittaker of Hardcore Gamer gave the game a 3.5/5, and wrote: "Evaluating NBA 2K16 as a whole is actually an interesting challenge. On one hand, this is arguably the most mechanically sound sports game on the market and the gameplay improvements that Visual Concepts made are downright superb. The issue here lies with the decision to make Livin 'Da Dream the focus and backbone of MyCareer falling flat. There are some moments throughout Spike Lee's in-game film that might bring a smile to your face, but this story doesn't lend itself to this franchise's gameplay or the video game medium itself. Yes, basketball fans will likely have a great time playing NBA 2K16 for hours on end, but there are too many small steps back here that can't be ignored. The good news for fans of sports games is that the first misstep in this great franchise is still a very good game, which speaks to how truly fun its gameplay is."

During the 19th Annual D.I.C.E. Awards, the Academy of Interactive Arts & Sciences nominated NBA 2K16 for "Sports Game of the Year".

=== Sales ===
Within its first week of release, NBA 2K16 shipped over 4 million copies, making it the fastest selling game in the series. Additionally, digital sales of the game for the first week doubled from NBA 2K15. NBA 2K16 was also the best-selling game in the United States for September 2015. At The Game Awards 2015, NBA 2K16 was nominated for Best Sports/Racing Game; it ultimately lost to Rocket League. At the 2015 National Academy of Video Game Trade Reviewers Awards, NBA 2K16 won Game, Franchise Sports.
