= The Looks =

Studio album by Mstrkrft
- Released: 18 July 2006
- Genre: Electro house
- Length: 45:51
- Label: Last Gang
- Producer: Mstrkrft

Mstrkrft chronology
| The Looks (2006) | Fist of God (2009) |

Singles from The Looks
- 1. "Easy Love" Released: 31 January 2006; 2. "Work on You" Released: 6 July 2006; 3. "Street Justice" Released: 18 January 2007

Professional ratings
Aggregate scores
| Source | Rating |
|---|---|
| Metacritic | 62/100 |
Review scores
| Source | Rating |
| NME | 4/5 stars |
| Pitchfork | 5.9/10 |

The Looks is the debut album by Mstrkrft, released on 18 July 2006. All songs were written by Jesse F. Keeler and Al-P.

== History ==
In the 15–21 June 2006 edition of The Stranger, Keeler explains the origin of the album's title: "My girlfriend and I were watching American Idol, and judge Randy critiqued this one girl as having 'the looks' but not the talent. So we laughed at this intangible thing 'the looks' that can be good or bad, and later it became [our] album title. Because if you think about it, it doesn't mean anything, especially in terms of our album."

The earliest version of the track "Paris" was composed on a laptop, on a plane taking Keeler and Al-P back home after a trip in Paris. "Easy Love" and "Paris" were made available on the band's MySpace account before the album's release.

The cover art was designed by Seripop and won the Juno award for Best CD/DVD Cover Design of the Year in 2007.

== Track listing ==
All tracks are written by Jesse F. Keeler and Al-P

The Looks track listing
| No. | Title | Length |
|---|---|---|
| 1. | "Work on You" | 6:02 |
| 2. | "Easy Love" | 5:32 |
| 3. | "She's Good for Business" | 5:04 |
| 4. | "Paris" | 5:47 |
| 5. | "The Looks" | 4:56 |
| 6. | "Street Justice" | 6:52 |
| 7. | "Bodywork" | 5:52 |
| 8. | "Neon Knights" | 5:46 |
| Total length: | | 45:51 |
