= NBA 2K15 =

2014 video game

- Cover art featuring Kevin Durant
- Developer: Visual Concepts
- Publisher: 2K
- Series: NBA 2K
- Platforms: Windows; PlayStation 3 PlayStation 4 Xbox 360; Xbox One; Android iOS
- Release: NA: October 7, 2014; AU: October 9, 2014; EU: October 10, 2014; JP: November 27, 2014; Android, iOS: WW: October 16, 2014
- Genre: Sports
- Modes: Single-player, multiplayer

NBA 2K15 is a 2014 basketball video game developed by Visual Concepts and published by 2K. It is the sixteenth installment in the NBA 2K franchise and the successor to NBA 2K14. It was released in October 2014 for Microsoft Windows, PlayStation 3, PlayStation 4, Xbox 360 and Xbox One. Kevin Durant of the Oklahoma City Thunder, one of the three cover athletes of NBA 2K13, is the solo cover athlete of NBA 2K15. NBA 2K15 was succeeded by NBA 2K16.

Starting from NBA 2K15, keyboard button configurations on the PC version are fixed to a specific layout and cannot be changed which new players will need to adapt to. It is recommended to play all future installments on a game controller.

== New features ==
=== Scanning system ===
NBA 2K15 allows players to scan their faces into the game for created players, using the PlayStation Camera on PlayStation 4 or the Kinect on the Xbox One. The 3D mapping process creates a realistic rendition of the gamer's face to make their gaming experience as real as possible. The process of scanning the face will take about 30 seconds. Players need to get very close (6-12 inches) to the camera and slowly turn their heads 30 degrees to the left and right during the scanning process.

=== MyCareer mode and upgrading system ===
For 8th-Gen systems (PC, PlayStation 4, and Xbox One), MyCareer Mode has been revamped with new additions such as the mentor and upgrading system. The player's MyPlayer speaks to the leader of the team before and after games. 2K implemented their voices providing for a more in-depth user experience. These features have allowed for a greater "storyline" to be integrated into MyCareer mode. MyCareer also uses a new upgrading system which gets more virtual currency from endorsement deals, completing challenges, and badges (which come in bronze, silver, and gold). However, on 8th-Gen systems, players cannot view playoff stats or the playoff tree.

=== Coaching advice ===
A new coach satisfaction system has been introduced that provides real-time feedback based on the MyPlayer's court performance. MyPlayer is mentored by former Los Angeles Clippers head coach Doc Rivers, who will either praise or admonish the player based on their gameplay.

== Development ==
The game included a pre-order bonus pack which includes 5,000 Virtual Currency (VC), 2 MyTEAM card packs, a choice of an International MyTEAM card or rookie Kevin Durant, and MyPLAYER jerseys inspired by Durant. On August 6, 2014, it was announced that Crew will be back in the game for current-gen consoles, then on August 7, 2014, it was announced that the game would have a new mode called MyLeague, which is similar to NBA 2K14's GM mode, but with added customization and improvements. New RPG elements have also been introduced to the game, such as the conversation system and press conferences. On September 17, 2014, it was announced a face scanning system would be introduced into the game, allowing players to add their own likeness into the game. There is a MyNBA2K15 mobile app that came out along with the game. It was also announced in August 2014 that the PC version would essentially be the same as the Xbox One and PlayStation 4 versions, making use of graphical enhancements first introduced in the eighth-generation versions of NBA 2K14.

The soundtrack was curated by Pharrell Williams.

== Soundtrack ==
- A Tribe Called Quest - "Scenario"
- Afrika Bambaataa and the Soulsonic Force - "Planet Rock"
- Basement Jaxx - "Hot 'n Cold"
- Black Rebel Motorcycle Club - "River Styx"
- Busta Rhymes - "Dangerous"
- Clipse - "Grindin'"
- Death from Above 1979 - "Romantic Rights"
- Depeche Mode - "Personal Jesus"
- Junior - "Mama Used to Say"
- Lauryn Hill - "Doo Wop (That Thing)"
- Lorde - "Team"
- Major Lazer featuring Pharrell Williams - "Aerosol Can"
- Missy Elliott - "On & On"
- No Doubt - "Spiderwebs"
- OneRepublic - "Love Runs Out"
- Pharrell Williams - "Hunter"
- Pharrell Williams featuring Gwen Stefani - "Can I Have It Like That?"
- Pharrell Williams - "How Does It Feel?"
- Public Enemy - "Shut 'Em Down" (Pete Rock Remix)
- Ratatat - "Seventeen Years"
- Red Hot Chili Peppers - "Suck My Kiss"
- Santigold - "Creator"
- Snoop Dogg featuring Pharrell Williams - "Drop It Like It's Hot"
- Strafe - "Set It Off"
- The Black Keys - "Everlasting Light"
- The Rapture - "House of Jealous Lovers"
- The Strokes - "Under Cover of Darkness"

== Reception ==
Reception

Aggregate score
Aggregator	Score
Metacritic	(PC) 87/100 (PS4) 83/100 (XONE) 82/100 (iOS) 68/100

Review scores
Publication	Score
Electronic Gaming Monthly	6/10
GameSpot	9/10
GameTrailers	8.7/10
IGN	7.8/10
Hardcore Gamer	4/5

NBA 2K15 received "generally favorable" reviews from critics, according to review aggregator Metacritic.

Josiah Renaudin of GameSpot gave the game a 9/10, praising the control scheme, realistic presentation and animations, unparalleled level of customization and the helpful shot meter, but stated that the visual update is not as drastic as NBA 2K14.

Mike Mitchell of IGN praised the great graphics, smooth control as well as the improved MyCareer mode, but criticized the severe server problems and occasionally broken Face Scan. USA Today said the game featured the best commentary on any sports game.

Andrew Fitch of Electronic Gaming Monthly gave the game a 6/10; he stated in his review that the game delivers a solid core basketball experience, particularly with MyCareer mode, which features real-life NBA player voices, but criticized that the online component and broken server, which can make the game unplayable, wrecks the overall experience.

During the 18th Annual D.I.C.E. Awards, the Academy of Interactive Arts & Sciences nominated NBA 2K15 for "Sports Game of the Year".

== Sales ==
NBA 2K15 shipped 5.5 million units by February 4, 2015. As of August 2015, the game has shipped 7 million units.
