= Turbowolf =

English rock band

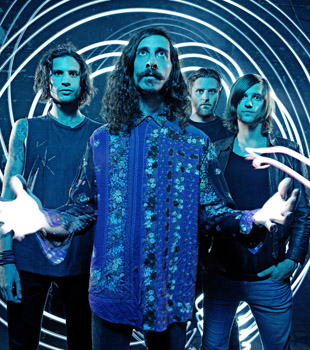
- Turbowolf in 2011

Background information
- Origin: Bristol, England
- Genres: Hard rock, stoner rock
- Years active: 2008–present
- Labels: Spinefarm
- Members: Chris Georgiadis; Andy Ghosh; Blake Davies; Lianna Lee Davies
- Past members: Jeremy Dunham; Chris Davis; Betty Cottam; Joe Baker
- Website: turbowolf.co.uk

Turbowolf are an English hard rock band founded in Bristol in 2008, whose members include Chris Georgiadis (vocals and synthesisers), Andy Ghosh (guitar), Lianna Lee Davies (bass guitar) and Blake Davies (drums). Their first album, Turbowolf, was released in November 2011 on Hassle Records.

The media have so far struggled to categorise the band's music, partly due to their diverse influences. AllMusic described the band as a "shape-shifting hard rock outfit ... that offers up a heady mix of punk, psych-rock, metal, and electronica.

== History ==
Before releasing their first album, Turbowolf spent several years developing their musical style in a series of UK tours and shows with the likes of The Eighties Matchbox B-Line Disaster, The Computers, Pulled Apart by Horses and Dinosaur Pile-Up. In 2010, they also toured in Europe with Korn and Dimmu Borgir. The band has also been very active on the festival circuit, with performances at Download, Sonisphere, Lovebox, Great Escape, SXSW, Boardmasters and Hevy among others.

Shortly after signing to Hassle Records in June 2011, Turbowolf released "A Rose for the Crows" as their first single. The video, directed by Stephen Agnew, was previewed exclusively on Kerrang! magazine's website. The second single "Read & Write" had a heavily psychedelic video (also directed by Agnew), which was premiered on NME magazine's website.

An EP titled Covers EP Vol 1 with cover versions of four songs ("See Through Head" – The Hives, "Electric Feel" – MGMT, "Captain Caveman" – Lightning Bolt and "Somebody To Love" – Jefferson Airplane/The Great Society) was released in October 2012.

In April 2014, Turbowolf released another single, "Solid Gold", which was available as a free download on Kerrang! magazine's website which also hosted the accompanying video.

In October 2014, they released another single, "Rabbits Foot", which was supported by BBC Radio 1 as their rockest record of the week and which appeared on many of the radio station's daytime shows, making it Turbowolf's most listened to song. A music video for this was released that autumn. The band also announced a tour with Death from Above 1979 and another headlining tour with bands including Hyena and Dolomite Minor around December in the same year.

Turbowolf's second album, Two Hands, was released on 6 April 2015 through Spinefarm Records/Search and Destroy Records.

Turbowolf has said that they are working on a new album named Quell: The Ever Changing Sorcerer of Past, Present & Future which is scheduled to be released when the next solar eclipse takes place, but the lead single has been confirmed as ‘Midnight Pineapple’.

== Reception ==
Turbowolf's first album was met with critical acclaim after its 11 November 2011 release. Artrocker magazine gave the album 5/5 and made it their Album of the Month, describing it as "fascinating".

Kerrang! magazine said the album was "glorious" and that "Turbowolf truly excel", describing the sound as "a tasty thick soup of distorted boogie rock, psychedelic weirdness and snarling punk attitude."

Thrash Hits gave the album 5.5/6 and said, "While giving this album one more spin as I checked this review for typos, I felt that giddy rush and desire to shout about Turbowolf at the top of my lungs to any and all people within earshot. I'm questioning how I could've ever feared that it wouldn't be worth the wait – it would've been worth twice this wait."

Rock Sound gave the record 8/10 describing it as "exceptional", while also saying, "It's utterly filthy, untold amounts of fun."

Total Guitar magazine said the album was "a speaker-crunching shot into the arm of the UK rock scene. The best British debut we've heard this year."

Punktastic awarded the album 4.5/5 and said, "TURBOWOLF have created one of the most original and exciting releases in recent years. What makes the concept of Turbowolf (and indeed the debut release) so exciting is their ability to further develop upon [their] influences, resulting in a creatively unique and engaging style, far removed from any of their contemporaries. Through this self-titled debut, the band have set the benchmark for British music at an extremely high and thoroughly merciless level."

Big Cheese magazine said, "Combining their unmistakeable rocket pace with some frantically feral vocals and riffs, it's hard not to get swept away in the rocking madness."

Sludgefactory gave the album 10/10 and opened its review, "If you like heavy, down-and-dirty, balls out rock 'n' roll then stop reading this review and go buy this album, simple as that. Okay, I guess I can tell you why you should get this album but you are just wasting precious minutes you could be spending listening to this incredible debut album by the UK's TURBOWOLF", adding, "I could go on and on about this album but you really have to hear it to believe it. The only downside to this CD is that it ends."

Northern Grit Zine gave the album 5/5 saying, "The self titled début album from the Bristol based, psychedelic loving Turbowolf is nothing short of astonishing. Stand out tracks aren't easy to choose, due to the immense quality of every single song. Put simply, this album is flawless; fans of punk, psychedelic, and rock can all come together with this one, and appreciate the mammoth that is Turbowolf."

However AltSounds.com found the album "obvious" and "formulaic", saying, "Both the lyrical content of ['Introduction'] and subsequent number, 'Ancient Snake,' bemoan doomed romance in a much too obvious way. When not behind a demonic subtext, these lead vocals sound like emo dressed in the guises of crunch metal riffs."

== Discography ==
Studio albums:

- Turbowolf (2011)
- Two Hands (2015)
- The Free Life (2018)
- Quell: The Ever Changing Sorcerer of Past, Present & Future (2024)

EPs:

- Covers EP Vol. 1 (12", EP) (Hassle Records, 2012)

Singles:

- "Bite Me Like a Dog" (7", single) X Recordings (2008)
- "Read and Write" (CDr, single, promo) Lupata Records (2009)
- "Ancient Snake" (CDr, single) (self-released) (2010)
- "Let's Die" (CDr, single) (self-released) (2011)
- "Rabbits Foot" (single) (Spinefarm, Search and Destroy, 2014) [#28 Mainstream Rock Tracks]
- "Domino" (digital single) (So Recordings) (2018)

Demos:

- "Avec, Avec!" V2M Production (2007)
