= Is 4 Lovers =

Studio album by Death from Above 1979
- Released: March 26, 2021
- Genre: Dance-punk
- Length: 31:02
- Labels: Everything Eleven, Inc., Universal Music Canada, Spinefarm Records
- Producer: Death From Above 1979

Death from Above 1979 chronology
Outrage! Is Now (2017)	Is 4 Lovers (2021)	Private Lives (2027)

Singles from Is 4 Lovers
- 1. "One + One" Released: February 3, 2021

Professional ratings
Aggregate scores
Source	Rating
Metacritic	71/100
Review scores
Source	Rating
AllMusic	4/5 stars
Clash Magazine	7/10 stars
Exclaim!	8/10 stars
The Independent	3/5 stars
Kerrang!	3/5 stars
musicOMH	3/5 stars
NME	4/5 stars
Paste	6.7/10

Is 4 Lovers is the fourth studio album by Canadian rock duo Death from Above 1979. The album was released on March 26, 2021, through Universal Music Canada.

The album was preceded by the single, "One + One", which was released on February 3, 2021.

== Reception ==
Is 4 Lovers has received generally positive reviews. At Metacritic, which assigns a normalized rating out of 100 to reviews from professional publications, the release received an average score of 71, based on 11 reviews, indicating "generally favorable reviews". The album received four-star reviews from both Allmusic and NME. Writing for the former, Matt Collar praised the album for its "sonically vibrant production" that "feels bigger and more robust than you might expect." Meanwhile, writing for the latter, Andrew Trendell described Is 4 Lovers as "their best album since their debut, adding that "Death From Above still pack a punch, but the bruise is a lot more colourful this time." Exclaim!'s Ashley Hampson gave the album an eight out of 10, in particular praising the song "One + One" for "showcasing how much they've grown since their early days."

More mixed reviews came from The Independent and Kerrang!, who each gave the album three stars. The former's Roisin O'Connor said that while "much of their self-produced album... is great," it was also "a little deflating for a band whose history is based on boundary-pushing." The latter's Mark Sutherland, meanwhile, was critical of the band's attempt to change their sound in the latter half of the record. "It's a good idea to mix things up," he wrote, "but the move also renders them less visceral and dilutes their identity."

== Track listing ==
No.	Title	Length
1.	"Modern Guy"	3:30
2.	"One + One"	3:46
3.	"Free Animal"	2:50
4.	"N.Y.C. Power Elite Part I"	2:50
5.	"N.Y.C. Power Elite Part II"	1:30
6.	"Totally Wiped Out"	2:32
7.	"Glass Homes"	3:44
8.	"Love Letter"	4:17
9.	"Mean Streets"	2:26
10.	"No War"	3:37
Total length:		31:02

== Personnel ==
- Jesse F. Keeler – bass guitar, synthesizer, piano, keyboards, programming, backing vocals, production
- Sebastien Grainger – vocals, drums, percussion, programming, production

== Charts ==
Chart performance for Is 4 Lovers
Chart (2021)	Peak position
German Albums (Offizielle Top 100)	63
