= Girlsareshort =

Electronic pop group

- Origin: Mississauga, Ontario, Canada
- Genres: Electronica
- Label: Upper Class Recordings
- Members: Al-P; Daniel Zabawa
- Website: upperclassrecordings.com/girlsareshort

Girlsareshort was an electronic pop group from Mississauga, Ontario, formed in 1998 by Alex Puodziukas, a.k.a. Al-P, Daniel Zabawa and David Regan. Girlsareshort released the 9-track album Contact Kiss in 2002 on Hi-Hat Recordings and the 14-track album Earlynorthamerican on Upper Class Recordings in 2003. The latter album included snippets of untrained youth choirs and samples of people giggling, contributing to its theme of what Exclaim! described as an "ode to summertime bliss and childlike innocence".

PopMatters reviewed the Earlynorthamerican as "a mixed bag, an album that wants to be more than the sum of its parts".

Al-P described the band as a "weirdo" project. The style anticipated the merging of electronic music with indie rock, as happened with such bands as Broken Social Scene. BSS members have been reported to be fans of Girlsareshort.

Al-P also has been a member of the electronic duo MSTRKRFT.
