= Outrage! Is Now =

Studio album by Death from Above
- Released: September 8, 2017
- Studios: Barefoot Recording Studio, Los Angeles
- Genres: Alternative rock; hard rock; heavy metal; dance-punk
- Length: 36:34
- Label: Last Gang
- Producer: Eric Valentine

Death from Above chronology
The Physical World (2014)	Outrage! Is Now (2017)	Is 4 Lovers (2021)

Singles from Outrage! Is Now
- 1. "Freeze Me" Released: June 7, 2017; 2. "Never Swim Alone" Released: August 15, 2017; 3. "Holy Books" Released: September 1, 2017

Outrage! Is Now is the third studio album by Canadian rock duo Death from Above 1979, and their only release under the original name 'Death from Above'. It was released on September 8, 2017, through Last Gang Records. The album was produced by Eric Valentine.

== Background ==
The band began writing new material shortly after the release of their second album The Physical World in 2014. The band briefly stayed at frontman Jesse F. Keeler's farm outside Toronto and experimented with ideas, slowly figuring out the direction of a new record. The duo considered recording/producing, the album themselves and heading in a more stripped down punk direction akin to their first record, however, as the songs evolved they decided this was the wrong direction to take. Due to the two members living in different cities, the two carried on the writing process disconnected and sending each other their ideas. Free from the pressure of making a new album after 10 years, the pair felt that the band belonged to them again rather than the fans and that they were free to make something different to fit the larger rooms they were playing. The band hired producer Eric Valentine, impressed with his diverse production credits including Smash Mouth, Third Eye Blind and Queens of the Stone Age. The band believed that working with him would allow the band to break out of their comfort zone and not repeat the sound of their first two albums. In an interview with Revolver, Keeler stated "those initial things that you do that work, you try them the next time. That's the learning process. But at a certain point you can get to where the things that you're doing are you going through the motions and not you being a part of the actual moment and almost ignoring the person you're being that way for."

For the songs on the album the band took influence from events in their personal lives as well as the socio-political state of the world. The song 'Never Swim Alone' features references to American Idol, YouTube as well as Buddhism. The song "Moonlight" is about Sebastien Grainger being jumped and assaulted while on tour. "It was one of those situations where you become extremely peaceful because you think 'This is it,' but also there was this overwhelming sense of 'I don't want to die, I don't want to die.'"

On June 6, 2017, the band released the first single from the album "Freeze Me" alongside the announcement that they were removing the "1979" from their name and now going under the name of "Death from Above." The album was officially announced on August 15 alongside the release of the single "Never Swim Alone." Alongside its release the band stated that the "record is very much the result of the environment and experiences of the last five years. If we didn't have struggle, life would be really fucking boring. These songs are a anti-boredom manifesto."

== Artwork ==
The album cover for Outrage! Is Now is based on black-and-white posters displayed by John Lennon and Yoko Ono that read "WAR IS OVER! If You Want It", part of a campaign launched ahead of Lennon and Ono's 1971 single "Happy Xmas (War Is Over)".

== Reception ==
Professional ratings
Aggregate scores
Source	Rating
Metacritic	65/100
Review scores
Source	Rating
AllMusic	4/5 stars
Clash	9/10 stars
Classic Rock	3.5/5 stars
Consequence of Sound	C
The Independent	4/5 stars
The Line of Best Fit	8/10 stars
Pitchfork	7.3/10
Tiny Mix Tapes	1.5/5 stars

Outrage! Is Now received generally positive reviews from music critics. On Metacritic, which assigns a normalized rating out of 100 to reviews from mainstream critics, the album received an average score of 65, based on 16 reviews. Some of the most positive reviewers believe the album to be their best to date, however others believed the album to pale in comparison to their debut. Clash Magazine praised the band's progression away from the sound of their first two records believing that the album found "them actually enjoying the process of writing and experimenting with the potent formula they concocted back at the start of the millennium." Many praised the band's influence from classic rock and heavy metal drawing comparisons to David Bowie, Def Leppard, Guns N' Roses and Black Sabbath.

Many critics were mixed towards the band's adoption of social commentary rather than "their penchant for bruised and bruising love songs", with Consequence of Sound's Tyler Clark describing it as being "packed with all the insight and nuance of a Facebook comments section." In a negative review, Leah B. Levinson of Tiny Mix Tapes stated that "the shallow cynicism and apathy that animates so many of its songs are under-interrogated by its writers, instead finding form as a pessimist's non-committal, inconclusive pouting." Levinson also described the album as "regurgitative, calculated, and industry-tested" and criticised its use of production gimmicks.

== Track listing ==
No.	Title	Length
1.	"Nomad"	4:10
2.	"Freeze Me"	3:18
3.	"Caught Up"	4:30
4.	"Outrage! Is Now"	3:32
5.	"Never Swim Alone"	2:34
6.	"Moonlight"	3:10
7.	"Statues"	4:36
8.	"All I C Is U & Me"	3:00
9.	"NVR 4EVR"	3:50
10.	"Holy Books"	3:49
Total length:		36:34

== Personnel ==
Adapted from AllMusic credits section and Discogs.

Death from Above

- Jesse F. Keeler – bass guitar, synthesizer, keyboards, backing vocals
- Sebastien Grainger – lead vocals, backing vocals, drums, percussion, design

Additional musicians

- Ryan Dragon – horn
- James Marshall Mathews Jr. – shaker
- Mike Rocha – horn
- Peter Slocombe – horn
- Eric Valentine – piano, producer, engineer, mastering, mixing

Other credits

- Jonathan Sterling – assistant engineer
- Jeff Sosnow – A&R
- Frank Maddocks – design
- Rachel Many – design
- Artistic License – management
- Missy Worth – management

== Charts ==
Chart (2017)	Peak position
Canadian Albums (Billboard)	20
US Top Album Sales (Billboard)	59
