= Fist of God =

Studio album by Mstrkrft
- Released: 17 March 2009
- Genre: Electro house
- Length: 38:45
- Labels: Last Gang; Dim Mak / Downtown
- Producer: Mstrkrft

Mstrkrft chronology
| The Looks (2006) | Fist of God (2009) | Operator (2016) |

Singles from Fist of God
- 1. "Bounce / Vuvuvu" Released: 1 April 2008; 2. "Heartbreaker" Released: 26 July 2009

Fist of God is the second album by Mstrkrft, released on 17 March 2009 by Last Gang Records and Dim Mak Records/Downtown Records.

== Reception ==
Professional ratings
Aggregate scores
| Source | Rating |
|---|---|
| Metacritic | 58/100 |
Review scores
| Source | Rating |
| AllMusic | 3/5 stars |
| Clash | 7/10 |
| NME | 4/5 stars |
| Pitchfork | 6.0/10 |
| PopMatters | 3/10 |

Initial critical response to Fist of God was average. At Metacritic, which assigns a normalized rating out of 100 to reviews from mainstream critics, the album has received an average score of 58, based on 122 reviews. Jesse F. Keeler told Clash that he expected the mixed reception:

I expect a lot of people to not like the record, but I expect a lot more people to like the record now that we’ve reached a way bigger audience making it. It might sound like a calculated business move, but it was mainly a musical thing. We kinda knew what the reaction’d be, and we even told a lot of the kids on the message boards: ‘Well, a lot of you are gonna hate it’. It’s difficult, too, you know, because a lot of people have just discovered us, and they’re going to go on this record initially; but we didn’t want to make a record that was too ‘now’. We could have got a lot of the rappers - like The Cool Kids, Spank Rock and Kid Sister - but we tried to choose things and people that were more timeless. And, anyway, I love bad reviews, they’re my favourite things.

== Track listing ==
All tracks are written by Jesse F. Keeler and Al-P.

Fist of God track listing
| No. | Title | Length |
|---|---|---|
| 1. | "It Ain't Love" (featuring Lil' Mo) | 3:40 |
| 2. | "1,000 Cigarettes" | 3:26 |
| 3. | "Bounce" (featuring N.O.R.E. and Isis) | 2:51 |
| 4. | "Vuvuvu" | 3:39 |
| 5. | "Heartbreaker" (featuring John Legend) | 3:12 |
| 6. | "Fist of God" | 4:03 |
| 7. | "So Deep" (featuring Jahmal from the Carps) | 3:26 |
| 8. | "Click Click" (featuring E-40) | 3:28 |
| 9. | "Word Up" (featuring Ghostface Killah) | 3:51 |
| 10. | "Breakaway" (featuring Jahmal from the Carps) | 3:38 |
| 11. | "1,000 Cigarettes" (featuring Freeway; bonus track) | 3:11 |
| Total length: | | 38:45 |

== Charts ==
Chart performance for Fist of God
| Chart (2009) | Peak position |
|---|---|
| UK Albums (OCC) | 151 |
| US Heatseekers Albums (Billboard) | 43 |
| US Top Dance Albums (Billboard) | 12 |
