= Jeff Pelletier =

Canadian ultramarathon runner and filmmaker

Personal information
- Born: 29 June 1981 (age 45)

Sport
- Country: Canada
- Sport: Ultramarathon / Trail running
- Events: 100-mile races, 200-mile races, stage races
- Club: Time on Feet
- Team: Salomon Canada / Salomon running, 2013–2025

Jeff Pelletier (born 29 June 1981) is a Canadian ultramarathon runner, trail runner and filmmaker based in Vancouver, British Columbia.

He is known for his second-place finish at the Moab 240 in 2023 and for documentary-style trail-running films covering races such as the Ultra-Trail du Mont-Blanc, Tor des Géants, Namib Race and Moab 240.

== Running career ==
Canadian Running Magazine reported that he started running seriously at age 27 and later became active in ultra-trail racing, including events such as SwissPeaks and Tor des Géants. His early ultra-distance results included the Grand to Grand Ultra, Fat Dog 120, Sun Mountain 100 km, Cascade Crest Classic 100 Mile and Tor des Géants.

Pelletier's mountain-racing and filmmaking profile grew through long European races. Run the Alps highlighted his film about the Tor des Géants, a 330 km endurance race through the Aosta Valley in Italy. Pelletier finished the 2018 Tor des Géants in 4 days, 11 hours, 31 minutes and 53 seconds, placing 63rd overall.

Pelletier has also competed in multi-day desert and stage races. He finished fourth overall at the Namib Race, a stage race in Namibia, and later released a nine-part Racing Namibia video series. Canadian Running Magazine described the race as involving extreme heat, high winds and self-supported desert racing conditions. He later finished second overall at RacingThePlanet Special Edition: Georgia, a 250 km stage race in Georgia.

Pelletier completed the 2022 Ultra-Trail du Mont-Blanc in Chamonix, and Canadian Running Magazine covered his UTMB film about that race.

His strongest race result came at the 2023 Moab 240, where he finished second overall in 70 hours, 53 minutes and 16 seconds. The result placed him minutes behind winner Jesse Haynes, whose winning time was 70:47:49. Canadian Running Magazine reported that Pelletier moved from the top 10 to second place during the race's final stages, framing the performance as a late-race charge across the 240-mile course in southeastern Utah. Outdoor Vitals also interviewed him about the race, describing him as an ultrarunner and filmmaker from Vancouver.

Pelletier has continued racing internationally, with later results including Swiss Alps 100, EcoTrail Wicklow, TransLantau by UTMB, Badwater 135 and The Mammoth 200. He finished 24th overall at Badwater 135 and eighth overall at The Mammoth 200.

=== Salomon ===
Pelletier became associated with Salomon Canada and Salomon running during the 2010s. In 2016, Whistler.com described him as a Vancouver-based trail and ultra runner and a member of Team Salomon Canada. Hillsound later described him as an ultra-distance runner and Salomon Canada athlete ambassador. In 2025, Pelletier wrote that he had called himself a Salomon athlete since 2013 and that he would continue to collaborate with the brand after ending his status as an exclusive Salomon athlete.

== Filmmaking and media work ==
Pelletier produces long-form trail-running and adventure films, often documenting mountain races, stage races and fastpacking routes. His website describes him as a trail runner and filmmaker based in Vancouver who travels with Audrée Lafrenière while documenting mountain adventures on YouTube. His YouTube channel also describes him as a trail runner and filmmaker based in Vancouver, Canada.

Canadian Running Magazine has covered several of Pelletier's films, including his Racing Namibia series, his UTMB film and his Moab 240 documentary project. Run the Alps included his Tor des Géants film in a list of notable Alps trail-running videos.

Pelletier has also appeared on English- and French-language running podcasts discussing ultra-distance racing, filmmaking and trail-running travel. The Quebec trail-running podcast Pas sorti du bois featured Pelletier and Audrée Lafrenière in an episode titled "L'ultra-trail devant et derrière la caméra", describing them as a couple of ultramarathoners who travel the world to run trails and document their adventures.

== Personal life ==
Pelletier's partner is Quebec ultrarunner Audrée Lafrenière, who is also a trail runner. The two have travelled together for running, filming and fastpacking projects, with Lafrenière appearing in Pelletier's UTMB film and other adventure-running videos.

Canadian Running Magazine identified Lafrenière as the 2021 Quebec Mega Trail winner in its coverage of Pelletier's UTMB film. Pelletier and Lafrenière have also appeared together in French-language trail-running media, including Pas sorti du bois, which described their work across ultra-trail racing, filmmaking, coaching and guided trail-running trips.

== Selected results ==
Year	Race	Location	Distance	Time	Overall place	Notes	Ref.
2015	Grand to Grand Ultra	United States	169 mi / 6 stages	35:45:56	4th	Multi-day stage race	
2015	Fat Dog 120	British Columbia, Canada	120 mi	34:13:30	23rd	Mountain ultramarathon	
2016	Sun Mountain 100 km Trail Races	Washington, United States	100 km	10:00:45	7th	100 km trail race	
2017	Cascade Crest Classic	Washington, United States	100 mi	24:38:37	14th	100-mile mountain race	
2018	Tor des Géants	Aosta Valley, Italy	330 km	4d 11:31:53	63rd	Mountain endurance race	
2019	SwissPeaks 360	Switzerland	360 km	4d 17:25:18	19th	Alpine ultramarathon	
2021	Namib Race	Namibia	200 km / 5 stages	24:12:22	4th	Multi-day desert stage race	
2021	Québec Mega Trail 100 Mile	Quebec, Canada	110 mi	28:22:57	8th	100-mile trail race	
2022	RacingThePlanet Special Edition: Georgia	Georgia	250 km / 6 stages	24:37:31	2nd	Multi-day stage race	
2022	Ultra-Trail du Mont-Blanc	Chamonix, France	170 km	34:35:11	390th	390th of 1,789 finishers	
2023	Pyrenees Stage Run	Pyrenees, Spain	220 km / 7 stages	41:18:03	31st	Stage race	
2023	Moab 240	Moab, Utah, United States	240 mi	70:53:16	2nd	Second overall; finished minutes behind winner Jesse Haynes	
2024	Swiss Alps 100	Switzerland	100 mi	33:42:15	22nd	Alpine 100-mile race	
2024	EcoTrail Wicklow	Wicklow, Ireland	80 km	9:21:19	27th	Trail ultramarathon	
2024	TransLantau by UTMB	Lantau Island, Hong Kong	53 km	10:07:46	96th	UTMB World Series event	
2025	Badwater 135	Death Valley, United States	135 mi	32:44:33	24th	Road ultramarathon	
2025	The Mammoth 200	Mammoth Lakes, California, United States	200 mi	57:55:27	8th	200-mile race; first M40	
2026	Lake Sonoma 50K	Healdsburg, California, United States	50 km	5:49:07	39th	50 km trail race	
