= Slaughter Daughter =

EP by Die Mannequin
- Released: September 25, 2007
- Genres: Alternative rock, punk rock, glam punk
- Length: 20:29
- Label: How To Kill
- Producers: Ian D'Sa (Tracks 1–2); Junior Sanchez (Tracks 3–4)

Die Mannequin chronology
How To Kill (2006)	Slaughter Daughter (2007)	Unicorn Steak (2007)

Slaughter Daughter is the second EP by the Canadian rock band Die Mannequin, released on September 25, 2007. "Do It or Die" and "Saved By Strangers" were produced by Ian D'Sa of Billy Talent and "Upside Down Cross" and "Lonely of a Woman" were produced by Junior Sanchez. "Open Season" is a live bootleg recording.

== Track listing ==
All songs written by Care Failure, except "Upside Down Cross" by Care Failure and Michael T. Fox.

1. "Do It or Die" – 3:36
2. "Saved By Strangers" – 3:24
3. "Upside Down Cross" – 3:55
4. "Lonely of a Woman" – 3:40
5. "Open Season - Raw Bootleg" – 5:57

== Personnel ==
Die Mannequin

- Care Failure – lead vocals, guitar
- Anthony "Useless" Bleed – bass
- Pat M. – drums, percussion

Technical staff and artwork

- Tracks 1&2 Produced by Ian D'Sa
- Tracks 3&4 Produced by Junior Sanchez.
- Tracks 1&2 Recorded by Eric Ratz & Kenny Luong
- Tracks 3&4 Recorded by Ray Martin assisted by Jeff Pelletier
- All tracks mixed by Eric Ratz
- Mastered by Noah Mintz
- Art by Care Failure / Marc P.

== See also ==
Die Mannequin
