= The Physical World =

Studio album by Death from Above 1979
- Released: September 9, 2014
- Studio: Sunset Sound; Hillside
- Genre: Dance-punk; noise rock; alternative rock
- Length: 35:54
- Label: Last Gang
- Producer: Dave Sardy

Death from Above 1979 chronology
You're a Woman, I'm a Machine (2004)	The Physical World (2014)	Outrage! Is Now (2017)

Singles from The Physical World
- 1. "Trainwreck 1979" Released: July 8, 2014; 2. "Government Trash" Released: August 14, 2014; 3. "Virgins" Released: April 27, 2015

Professional ratings
Aggregate scores
Source	Rating
AnyDecentMusic?	7.3/10
Metacritic	75/100
Review scores
Source	Rating
AllMusic	4/5 stars
Alternative Press	4.5/5 stars
The A.V. Club	B
The Guardian	4/5 stars
Mojo	3/5 stars
NME	9/10
The Observer	3/5 stars
Pitchfork	7.0/10
Rolling Stone	3/5 stars
Uncut	7/10

The Physical World is the second studio album by Canadian rock duo Death from Above 1979. It was released September 9, 2014, through Last Gang Records. The album was produced by Dave Sardy who has previously worked with artists such as Oasis, Red Hot Chili Peppers, LCD Soundsystem, and Nine Inch Nails.

== History ==
The album was announced on June 11, 2014. The first single, "Trainwreck 1979", about the 1979 Mississauga train derailment, was released on July 8, and the second single, "Government Trash", was released on August 14. "Trainwreck 1979" impacted radio on August 5, 2014.

The album was a long-listed nominee for the 2015 Polaris Music Prize. It was named Rock Album of the Year for 2015 at the Juno Awards.

== Track listing ==
No.	Title	Length
1.	"Cheap Talk"	3:15
2.	"Right On, Frankenstein!"	3:05
3.	"Virgins"	3:08
4.	"Always On"	2:32
5.	"Crystal Ball"	2:51
6.	"White Is Red"	4:27
7.	"Trainwreck 1979"	3:46
8.	"Nothin' Left"	2:30
9.	"Government Trash"	3:00
10.	"Gemini"	2:25
11.	"The Physical World"	4:51

== Personnel ==
Death From Above 1979

- Jesse F. Keeler – bass, synthesizer, songwriting
- Sebastien Grainger – drums, vocals, songwriting

Additional personnel

- Dave Sardy – production, mixing recording
- Andy Brohard – engineering
- Cameron Barton – engineering
- Ryan Castle – engineering
- Show Group – design
- Eva Michon – photography
- Dennis Chow – "tattoo flash"

== Charts ==
Chart (2014)	Peak position
Belgian Albums (Ultratop Flanders)	65
Canadian Albums (Billboard)	3
Japan (Oricon Albums Chart)	145
UK Albums (OCC)	37
US Billboard 200	28
US Top Alternative Albums (Billboard)	3
US Top Rock Albums (Billboard)	7
