= The Free Life (album) =

Studio album by Turbowolf
- Released: 9 March 2018
- Genre: Hard rock; stoner rock
- Length: 41:51
- Label: Silva Screen

Turbowolf chronology
Two Hands (2015)	The Free Life (2018)	Quell (2024)

Singles from The Free Life
- 1. "The Free Life" Released: 16 October 2017; 2. "Domino" Released: 7 January 2018

Professional ratings
Aggregate scores
Source	Rating
Album of the Year	75/100
Review scores
Source	Rating
Allmusic	3.5/5 stars
Classic Rock	4/5 stars
Dead Press	8/10 stars
GIGsoup	86/100
Maximum Volume	8.5/10
Noizze	8.5/10
Sputnikmusic	4.0/5
Upset	3/5 stars

The Free Life is the third studio album by English hard rock band Turbowolf. The album was released on 9 March 2018 through Silva Screen Records.

== Track listing ==
All music is composed by Chris Georgiadis, Andy Ghosh, Blake Davies, and Lianna Lee Davies.

The Free Life track listing
No.	Title	Length
1.	"No No No"	4:11
2.	"Capital X"	3:05
3.	"Cheap Magic"	2:56
4.	"Very Bad"	4:03
5.	"Halfsecret"	2:54
6.	"Domino"	3:10
7.	"Last Three Clues"	4:29
8.	"Up & Atom"	4:53
9.	"Blackhole"	3:23
10.	"The Free Life"	5:52
11.	"Concluder"	2:55
Total length:		41:51
