= You're a Woman, I'm a Machine =

Studio album by Death from Above 1979
- Released: October 26, 2004
- Recorded: February–April 2004
- Studio: The Chemical Sound; Studio Plateau
- Genre: Dance-punk; noise rock
- Length: 35:03
- Label: Last Gang
- Producer: Al-P

Death from Above 1979 chronology
Heads Up! (2002)	You're a Woman, I'm a Machine (2004)	The Physical World (2014)

Singles from You're a Woman, I'm a Machine
- 1. "Romantic Rights" Released: November 4, 2004; 2. "Blood on Our Hands" Released: February 17, 2005; 3. "Black History Month" Released: June 13, 2005

You're a Woman, I'm a Machine is the debut studio album by Canadian rock duo Death from Above 1979. It was released October 26, 2004, through Last Gang Records. The album was produced by Al-P who would later work alongside Jesse F. Keeler in the electronic music duo MSTRKRFT.

== History ==
You're a Woman, I'm a Machine was recorded from February to April 2004 at The Chemical Sound in Toronto. Additional recording was done at Studio Plateau in Montreal and the album was engineered and produced by Al-P, with the exception of the Montreal sessions which were engineered by Drew Malamud.

All songs were written and recorded by Sebastien Grainger (drums and vocals) and Jesse F. Keeler (bass and synthesizer). The album was mastered by Joao Carvalho in his studio. All songs were published by Casino Steel Publishing Inc. and Iggy Softrock Publishing Inc. "Romantic Rights", "Blood on Our Hands" and "Black History Month" have been released as singles and remixed. "Little Girl", along with "Sexy Results", have also been remixed, and appear on their remix/b-side release, Romance Bloody Romance.

Vocalist and drummer Sebastien Grainger gave the song "Black History Month" its title simply because it was written in February. According to a post made by bassist Jesse F. Keeler on the band's forum, the song title "Sexy Results" is taken from The Simpsons. The episode "Pygmoelian" from the television series features the running line "...with sexy results".

The album's name is a play on a quote in the mini-series pilot of the 2004 reboot of Battlestar Galactica where Caprica Six tells Gaius Baltar "I'm a woman," to which he responds "You're a machine".

The liner notes dedicate the album to "Zoé", Grainger's niece. She is also the subject of the song "Little Girl" off the album.

== Reception ==
Professional ratings
Aggregate scores
Source	Rating
Metacritic	82/100
Review scores
Source	Rating
AllMusic	4/5 stars
Alternative Press	5/5
Drowned in Sound	10/10
Mojo	4/5 stars
NME	7/10
Pitchfork	8.3/10
Q	3/5 stars
Stylus Magazine	A−
Uncut	4/5 stars
The Village Voice	B−

The album has sold 175,000 copies worldwide according to the Toronto Star and gone gold (50,000 sold) in the band's native Canada.

== Track listing ==
No.	Title	Length
1.	"Turn It Out"	2:39
2.	"Romantic Rights"	3:15
3.	"Going Steady"	2:49
4.	"Go Home, Get Down"	2:20
5.	"Blood on Our Hands"	2:58
6.	"Black History Month"	3:48
7.	"Little Girl"	4:00
8.	"Cold War"	2:33
9.	"You're a Woman, I'm a Machine"	2:53
10.	"Pull Out"	1:50
11.	"Sexy Results"	5:55

Japan bonus track
No.	Title	Length
12.	"Romantic Rights (The Phones Lovers remix)"	4:40

Vinyl bonus track
No.	Title	Length
12.	"Do It"

UK bonus CD
No.	Title	Length
1.	"Better Off Dead" (La Peste cover)	2:17
2.	"Blood on Our Hands (Justice remix)"	3:52
3.	"Do It 93!" (live in Rio)	4:52
4.	"Romantic Rights (Erol Alkan's Love from Below re-edit)"	6:20
5.	"Little Girl (MSTRKRFT edition)"	3:36
6.	"You're Lovely (But You've Got Lots of Problems)"	3:06
7.	"Blood on Our Hands" (video)	3:02
8.	"Romantic Rights" (video)	3:17

== Certifications ==
Region	Certification	Certified units/sales
Canada (Music Canada)	Gold	50,000^{^}
^{^} Shipments figures based on certification alone.

== Personnel ==
Death from Above 1979

- Jesse F. Keeler – bass, synthesizer, songwriting, recording, backing vocals on "Pull Out," "You're a Woman, I'm a Machine," design, layout
- Sebastien Grainger – drums, vocals, songwriting, recording

Additional personnel

- Alex Puodziukas – production, engineering
- Drew Malamud – engineering
- Joao Carvalho – mastering
- Eva Michon – photography
