= Sebastien Grainger =

Canadian singer and musician (born 1979)

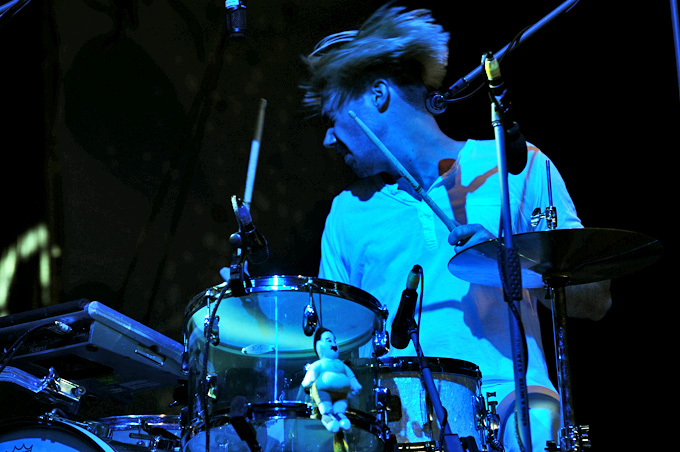

Background information
- Born: Sebastien Alexandre Grainger; 11 April 1979 (age 47); Mississauga, Ontario, Canada
- Genres: Rock, dance-punk
- Occupations: Songwriter, singer, multi-instrumentalist, producer
- Instruments: Vocals; drums; synthesizer
- Years active: 2001-present
- Label: Last Gang, Warner, Ache, Sound Virus, Vice, 679, Saddle Creek, Outside, JVC Japan, Hand Drawn Dracula, Universal, Fiction, Ancient Fashion
- Member of: Death from Above 1979; American Lips
- Spouse: Eva Michon (m.2009)
- Website: sebastiengrainger.com

Sebastien Alexandre Grainger (born 11 April 1979) is a Canadian musician, singer-songwriter, multi instrumentalist, and music producer based in Los Angeles, California. He is best known as the lead vocalist, drummer and songwriter of the alternative rock duo Death from Above 1979.

Grainger is the co-owner of Ancient Fashion Records with Adrian Popovich from garage punk band Tricky Woo. Together with Jessica Bruzzese they make records as American Lips. He is married to artist and filmmaker Eva Michon.

== Career ==
Grainger released his debut solo album, Sebastien Grainger & The Mountains, in 2008, followed by his second solo album, Yours to Discover, in 2013.

As part of the duo Bad Tits with Josh Reichmann, he released the EP Garbage Night in 2010. With the band American Lips, Grainger has recorded two albums: Kiss the Void, released in 2017, and On Strike! released in 2025.

Throughout his career as a performing artist he has shared the stage with acts such as Nine Inch Nails, Yeah Yeah Yeahs, Bloc Party, Metric, Anthrax, Queens Of The Stone Age,Alexisonfire, Billy Talent, Eagles Of Death Metal, Chromeo, At The Drive In, Thee Oh Sees, Broken Social Scene, Foo Fighters, Fucked Up, Holy Fuck, Albert Hammond Jr, Max Weinberg, Metz, The Dears, Deftones, The Blood Brothers among many others.

Additionally, Grainger has directed and edited music videos, written a short film and designed album art, merchandise and promotional materials for his various musical projects.

== Discography ==
=== Death from Above 1979 ===
Note: Sebastien Grainger has performed on all Death From Above recordings to date. Only studio albums have been listed here, for a more complete list of releases see Death from Above discography.

- 2004 You're a Woman, I'm a Machine
- 2014 The Physical World
- 2017 Outrage! Is Now
- 2021 Is 4 Lovers

=== American Lips ===
- 2017 Kiss the Void - LP (Ancient Fashion)
- 2022 Waste Of Crime - Single (Ancient Fashion)
- 2025 On Strike! - LP (Ancient Fashion)

=== Bad Tits ===
- 2010 Garbage Night - 7”/EP (Hand Drawn Dracula)

=== Solo ===
==== LPs ====
- 2008 Sebastien Grainger & The Mountains (Outside Music/Saddle Creek)
- 2013 Yours To Discover (Last Gang)
- 2020 Early Electric / Computer Recordings 2000-2003 (Ancient Fashion)

==== Singles ====
- 2007 Young Mothers - Friends In Bellwoods Compilation (Various Artists)
- 2008 Renegade Silence / When You Go Out (as “The Rhythm Method”) - Single (50 Bones UK)
- 2008 American Names / Ways To Come Home - Single (Outside Music/Saddle Creek)
- 2009 Home Is The Light - Friends In Bellwoods Compilation II (Various Artists)
- 2009 Who Do We Care For? / It’s A Living - Single (Outside Music/Saddle Creek)
- 2015 Socrates Nightmare - Single (Ancient Fashion)
- 2020 Live On The Current 2008 - EP (Ancient Fashion)

=== Features and Collaborations ===
- 2001 Femme Fatale - Fire Baptism EP - Drums
- 2007 K-os - “Sunday Morning” - Atlantis: Hymns for Disco LP - Drums
- 2008 DatA - Rapture EP - Vocals/Lyrics
- 2008 Fucked Up - “Twice Born” - The Chemistry Of Common Life LP - Vocals
- 2008 Does It Offend You, Yeah? - “Let’s Make Out” - You Have No Idea What You're Getting Yourself Into LP - Vocals/Lyrics
- 2009 DatA - “One In A Million” - Skywriter LP - Vocals/Lyrics
- 2009 Josh Reichmann Oracle Band - Crazy Power LP - Drums
- 2010 Broken Social Scene - “Never Felt Alive” - Lo-Fi For the Dividing Nights LP - Vocals/Lyrics
- 2012 Zowie - “Love or Hate” - Love Demolition LP - Vocals/Lyrics
- 2012 Felix Cartal - “H.U.N.T.” - Different Faces LP - Vocals/Lyrics
- 2012 The Yardlets - Middle Ages LP - Drums
- 2013 K-os - “Surf’s Up” - Black on Blonde LP - Vocals/Lyrics
- 2018 Turbowolf - “Cheap Magic” - The Free Life LP - Vocals
- 2022 Broken Social Scene - “Curse Your Fail” - Old Dead Young LP - Vocals/Lyrics

=== Selected Production Credits ===
- 2008 Sebastien Grainger - Sebastien Grainger & The Mountains - Producer/Engineer/Mixer
- 2010 Broken Social Scene - Forgiveness Rock Records - Engineer/Additional Production
- 2011 Nightbox - Pyramids - Producer/Engineer/Mixer
- 2012 Zowie - Love Or Hate - Producer/Engineer
- 2013 Sebastien Grainger - Yours To Discover - Producer/Engineer/Mixer
- 2014 Nightbox - Burning - Producer/Engineer
- 2017 American Lips - Kiss The Void - Mixer/Additional Production
- 2021 Death From Above 1979 - Is 4 Lovers - Producer/Engineer/Mixer
- 2024 Sam Jr. - Inner Shadow - Mixer
- 2025 American Lips - On Strike! - Producer/Engineer/Mixer

== Filmography ==
=== Music Videos ===
- 2008 Josh Reichmann Oracle Band - “Ancient Bloody Paradise” - Director/Editor
- 2009 Sebastien Grainger - “It’s A Living” - Director/Editor
- 2015 Sebastien Grainger - “Socrates Nightmare” - Director/Editor
- 2016 Islands - “The Weekend” - Director/Editor
- 2017 American Lips - “Heat Wave” - Director/Editor
- 2017 American Lips - “Beyond The 7-11” - Director/Editor
- 2017 Death From Above 1979 - “Never Swim Alone” - Director/Editor
- 2018 Death From Above 1979 - “Holy Books (Live In Toronto)” - Editor
- 2025 American Lips - “Cardboard Trash” - Director/Editor

=== Short Films ===
- 2017 All Shook Up directed by Eva Michon - Writer
