= Jesse F. Keeler =

Canadian musician (born 1976)

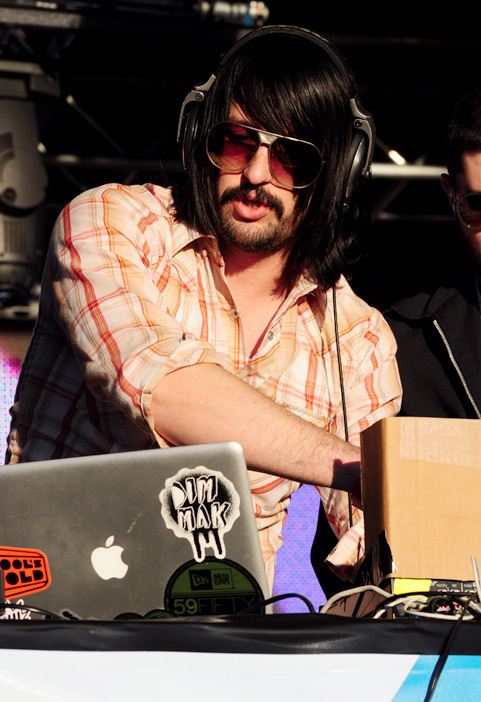
- Performing in 2009 at Wellington Square

Background information
- Born: Jesse Frederick Keeler; 11 November 1976 (age 49); Toronto, Ontario, Canada
- Genres: Rock; dance-punk; electro house; sass
- Instruments: Bass guitar; guitar; synthesizer; vocals; drums; saxophone
- Years active: 1998–present
- Labels: ORO; Teenage Riot; Ache; Sound Virus; Last Gang; Vice; 679

Jesse Frederick Keeler (born 11 November 1976) is a Canadian musician. He is known as the bassist, backing vocalist, and synthesist of Canadian dance-punk duo Death from Above 1979 and one half of the electronic music duo MSTRKRFT. In addition to singing, Keeler plays drums, guitar, bass, keyboards, and saxophone. He also works as a producer, lending music a variety of styles over the course of his career, including punk, hardcore, rock, house, and electro.

== Discography ==
=== Standing 8 ===
- Standing 8 (1998)
- Split w/ This Robot Kills (?)

=== Black Cat # 13 ===
- Wrist Towards Elbow (2000)
- I Blast Off! (2000)
- The Experiment Vol. 2: Casino Steel Vs. Black Cat # 13 (2000)
- Split w/ International Strike Force (2000)
- The Experiment, Vol. 1 (2000)

=== Casino Steel ===
- The Experiment Vol. 2: Casino Steel Vs. Black Cat # 13 (2000)

=== Femme Fatale ===
- As You Sow, So Shall You Reap (2002)
- Fire Baptism (2002)
- From the Abundance of the Heart, the Mouth Speaks (2004)

=== Death from Above ===
- You're a Woman, I'm a Machine (2004)
- The Physical World (2014)
- Outrage! Is Now (2017)
- Is 4 Lovers (2021)

=== MSTRKRFT ===
- The Looks (2006)
- Fist of God (2009)
- OPERATOR (2016)

=== Solo ===
- "Beehive"/"Towel Swinger" (2010) (w/ St. Mandrew)
- Face Pump (2010) (w/ St. Mandrew)
- Deathstalker (Scorpion's Theme) (from Mortal Kombat 9)
