= Death from Above 1979 =

Canadian rock duo

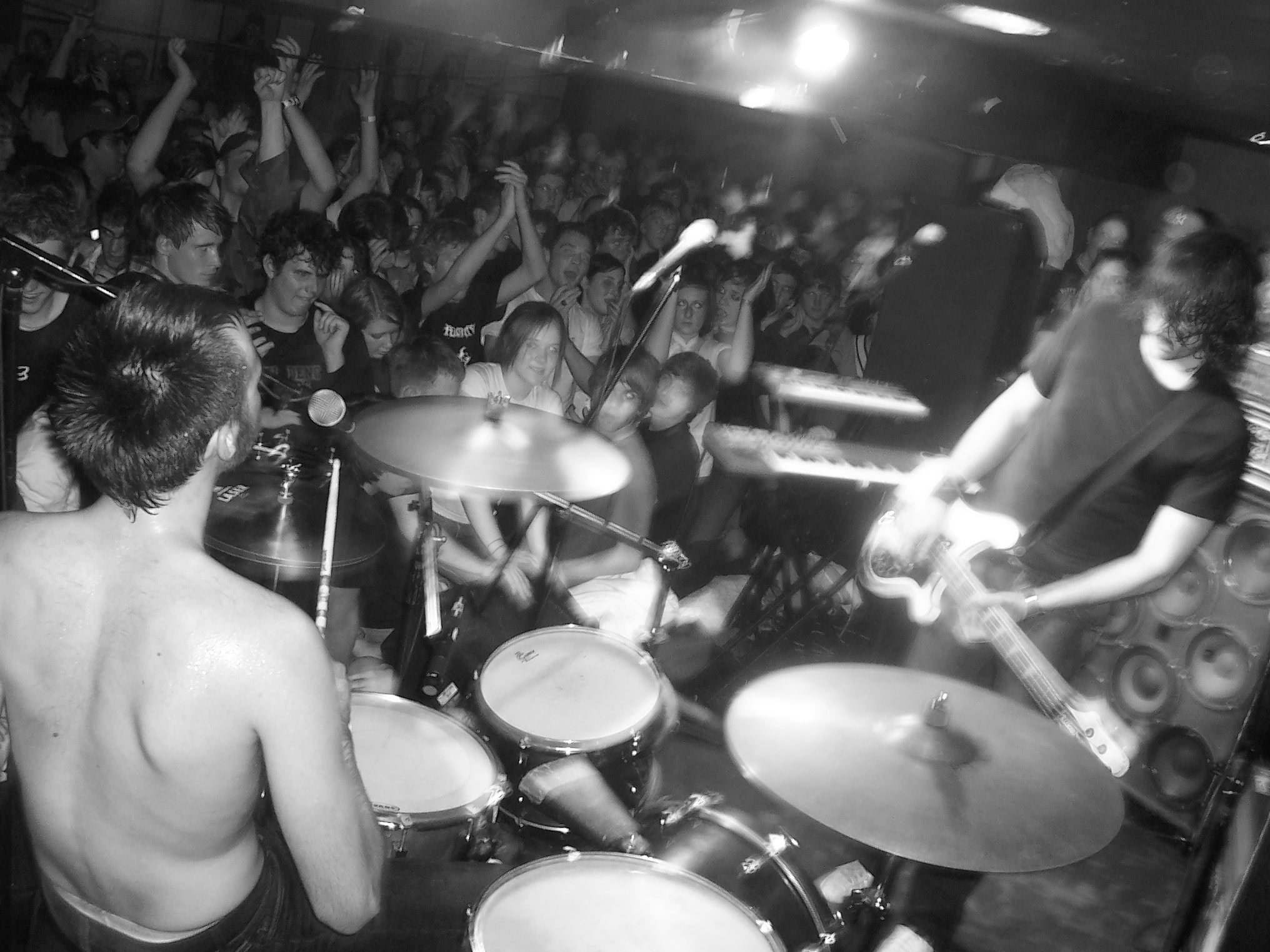
- Death from Above 1979 performing in 2004. From left: Sebastien Grainger, Jesse Keeler.

Background information
- Also known as: Death from Above (2001–2004, 2017–2020)
- Origin: Toronto, Ontario, Canada
- Genres: Dance-punk; noise rock; punk rock; hard rock
- Years active: 2001–2006; 2011–present
- Labels: Universal Canada; Last Gang; Ache
- Members: Jesse F. Keeler; Sebastien Grainger
- Website: deathfromabove1979.com

Death from Above 1979 (also known as Death from Above or DFA 1979) is a Canadian rock duo from Toronto, Ontario, formed in 2001 by bassist Jesse F. Keeler and drummer and vocalist Sebastien Grainger. The band released their debut album, You're a Woman, I'm a Machine, in 2004 and broke up in 2006. They reformed in 2011 and released their second album, The Physical World, in 2014. Since then the band has released two more albums, Outrage! Is Now in 2017 and Is 4 Lovers in 2021. A fifth, Private Lives, is slated for release in January 2027.

== History ==
=== Formation and Heads Up (2001–2003) ===
Grainger and Keeler reportedly met at a Sonic Youth concert, though they sometimes jokingly claimed to have met in prison, on a pirate ship, or in a gay bar, leading some journalists and fans to believe these stories. Keeler has also said to have met Grainger when looking for a drummer to play in his hardcore punk band Femme Fatale, further stating "That's how Death from Above got started." In a 2021 interview with Anthony Fantano, Keeler finally revealed how the band actually formed. In 2001, Keeler was playing drums in local Toronto band Black Cat #13 and was storing bass guitar gear at his house for a planned concert in Detroit opening for The Blood Brothers. The concert was cancelled due to the September 11 attacks, so Keeler invited Grainger to jam to put the equipment to use and they were inspired to form their own band.

Their name is derived from the 1979 film Apocalypse Now, when the underside of a helicopter reads "Death from Above".

On December 15, 2002, the band released their debut release, the EP Heads Up.

=== You're a Woman, I'm a Machine and break up (2004–2006) ===
The band began recording for their debut album, You're a Woman, I'm a Machine from February to April 2004 at The Chemical Sound in Toronto. Additional recording was done at Studio Plateau in Montreal and the album was engineered and produced by Al-P, with the exception of the Montreal sessions which were engineered by Drew Malamud. The album was released in October, 2004. The band released three singles to promote the album, "Romantic Rights" on November 4, 2004, "Blood on Our Hands" on February 17, 2005, and "Black History Month" on June 13, 2005. In 2005, the video for "Blood on Our Hands" won a VideoFACT award at the MuchMusic Video Awards.

In 2004, the band changed their name to "Death from Above 1979" (previously named "Death from Above") due to a cease and desist letter that was filed against the band by James Murphy's label Death From Above Records. The band responded by attaching the legal minimum number of numerals required to keep the first part of the name. On MuchMusic's television program The New Music, Keeler further explained why the band split. He claimed it was due to disagreements with bandmate Grainger on many levels, including creative differences and musical style.

=== Reunion and The Physical World (2011–2016) ===
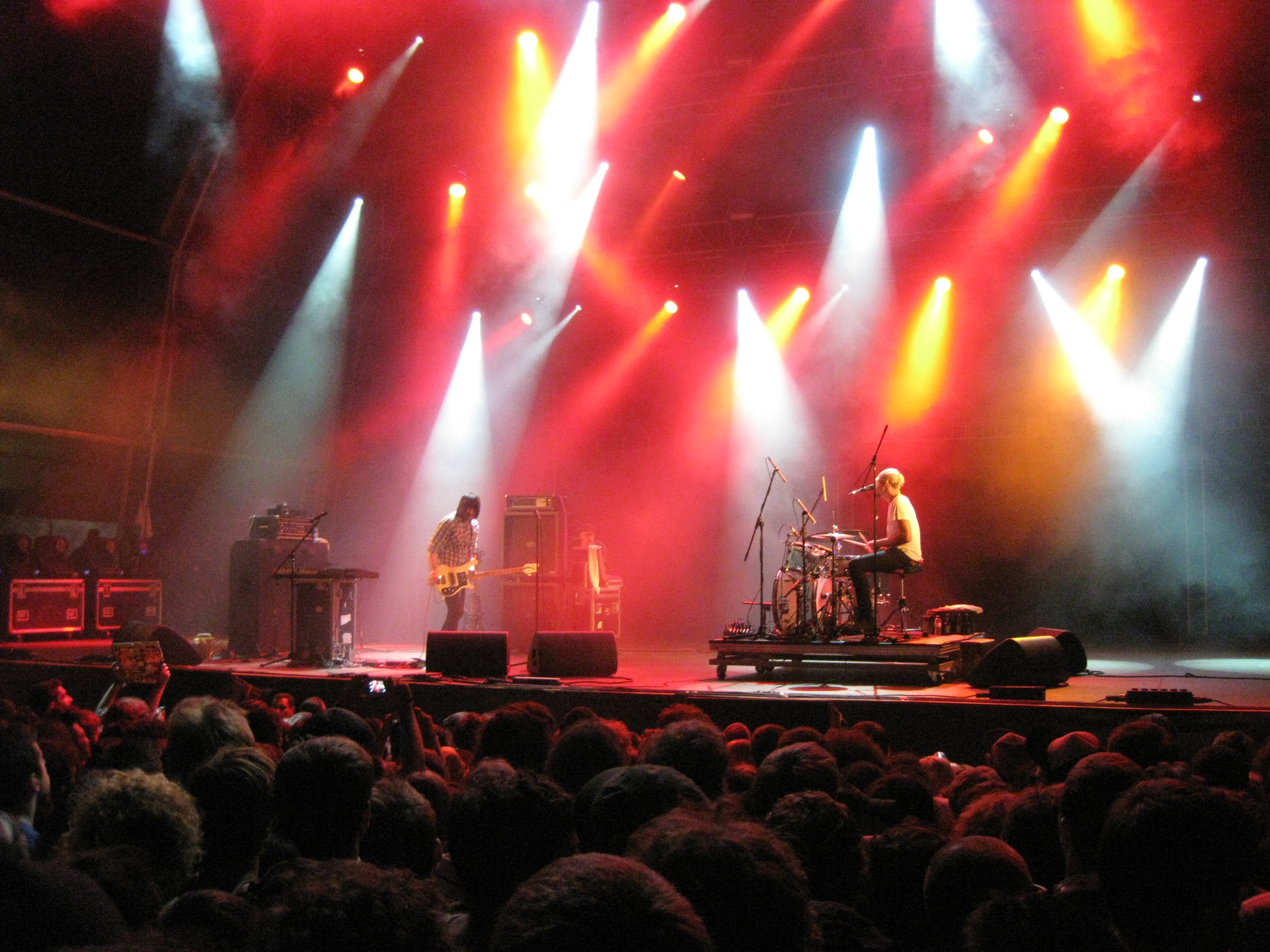
The band performing in 2011

On February 4, 2011, the band officially reunited, performing live for the first time in more than 5 years at Coachella on April 17, 2011. A world tour was announced for the summer of 2011.

The band performed a new song while performing at EdgeFest on July 14, 2012, at Downsview Park in Toronto. On September 18, 2012, a Canadian tour was announced; the band revealed that they had written new songs, but needed to perform them live in order to "make them any good". On October 28, 2012, the band's blog was updated as they built excitement for their string of shows around Canada. In the post, Grainger cited that they were "coming to share new material, and to work out the kinks". The band was originally scheduled to perform at Governors Ball Music Festival in June 2013, but later announced that they were having unexpected trouble while working on new music and cancelled their appearance. On July 11, 2013, the band confirmed that a new record is in the works on their Facebook page after cancelling European shows due to a "medical emergency". They did, however, perform at Wakestock Music Festival in August and Rifflandia in September. On July 8, 2014, the band released a single, "Trainwreck 1979", and announced more details of their upcoming studio album, The Physical World. On September 9, 2014, the band released their second album, The Physical World through Last Gang and Warner Bros. Records.

On October 7, 2014, the band released a documentary Life After Death from Above 1979. The documentary chronicled the history of the band and their reunion. It was directed by Grainger's wife, Eva Michon.

On April 22, 2016, the band released a live album, Live At Third Man Records which was recorded in 2015 at Jack White's Third Man Records headquarters in Nashville.

=== Outrage! Is Now (2017–2020) ===
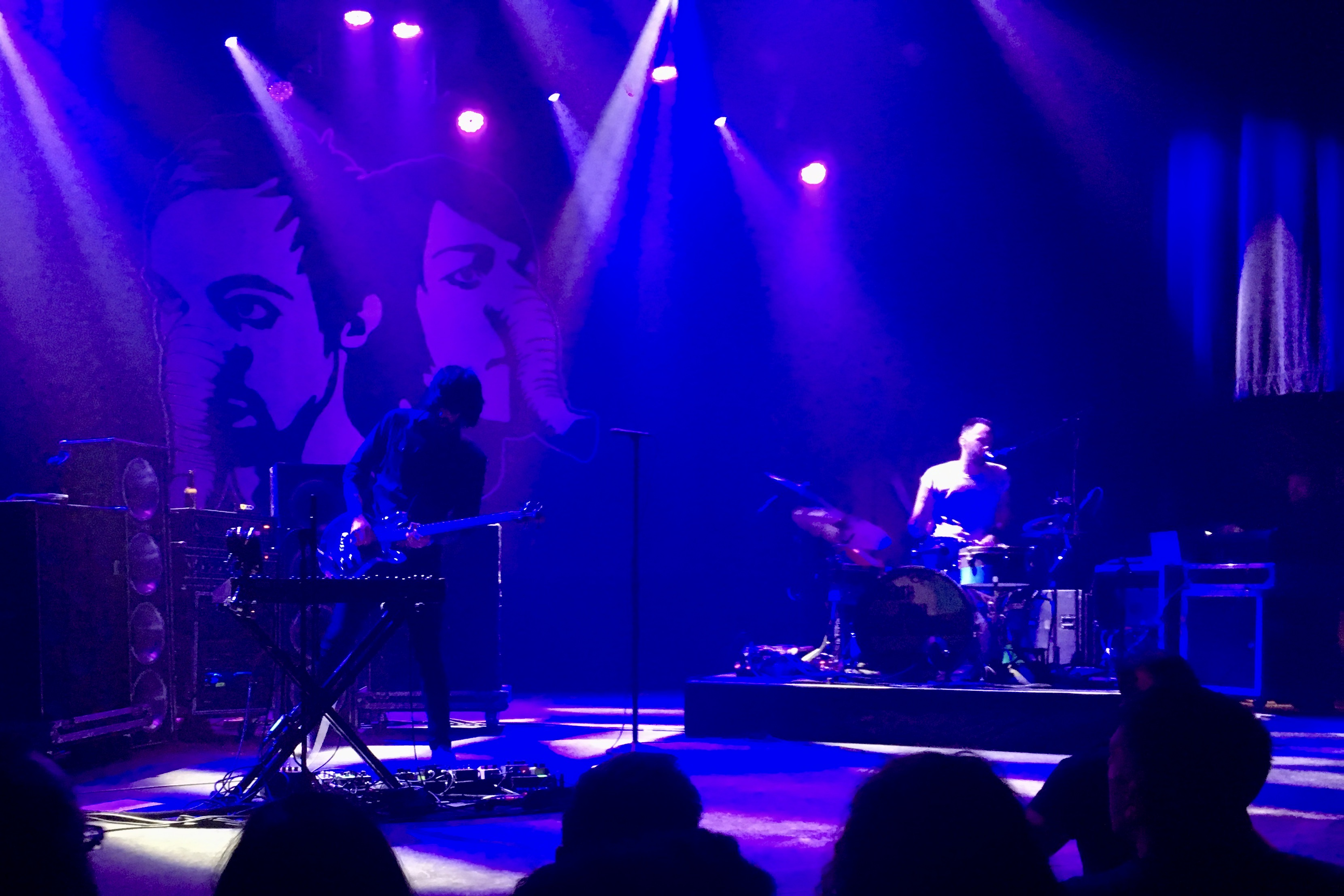
The band performing in 2019

On June 6, 2017, the band announced an official name change back to their original name Death from Above. Although their social media handles would keep the "1979" suffix, all future music and shows from the duo would reportedly arrive under the new name. Grainger explained in an interview that the band decided not to include the "1979" suffix on a tour promo for their tour with Eagles of Death Metal in early 2016, "just to see what would happen", and received no legal issues from it. This led to them doing it again on their tour promo with Black Rebel Motorcycle Club, again with no legal repercussions. Grainger also said the making of the album art for their single "Freeze Me" was also part of the decision: "The final straw was when I was making the art for our single 'Freeze Me'. I wanted to write the name out in ice, so I went on Amazon and ordered an ice cube tray in the alphabet. It came and there were no numbers. That was that." Along with the name change, the duo announced the new single, "Freeze Me." The song premiered on BBC Radio 1 before its release on June 7.

=== Is 4 Lovers (2020–2026) ===
In December 2020, the band wiped their social media pages. A series of posts to their Instagram grid revealed the band's logo, followed by a teaser video confirming the band's name change back to Death from Above 1979. After months of teaser posts, the band confirmed a new album on February 3, 2021. The album, Is 4 Lovers, was released on March 26. The announcement coincided with the release of a new single, "One + One". Due to ongoing COVID-19 restrictions on live events, the band were only able to play a handful of shows in order to promote the album that year – including Life Is Beautiful Music & Art Festival in Las Vegas and On the Bay in Hamilton.

The band toured in both 2022 and 2023 in support of Is 4 Lovers, while 2024 saw them undertake a run of shows celebrating the 20th anniversary of You're a Woman, I'm a Machine.

=== Private Lives (2026–present) ===
On January 26, 2026, it was announced that the band would be opening for Billy Talent's tour of the 20th anniversary of their second studio album Billy Talent II, during their July tour date in Toronto, alongside Hollerado. While playing shows in 2026, the band began playing two new songs: "Escape From Steeltown" and "Private Lives".

In September 2026, the band announced their fifth studio album Private Lives, sharing its title track as the lead single. The album is set for release on Friday, January 29th via Last Gang Records.

== Musical style ==
Throughout its career, the band has been described as dance-punk, noise punk, and punk rock. Grainger has stated when the band first started his and Keeler's aim was "to be as straight ahead as possible," and "to be the AC/DC of hardcore." Rolling Stone stated in 2017 that the band "embodied the DIY dance-punk aesthetic that lived in home recordings and grimy basement clubs" and that the band's early work "combined noisy hardcore, gritty synths and earnest screams".

== Members ==
- Sebastien Grainger – lead vocals, drums, percussion
- Jesse F. Keeler – bass, synthesizer, keyboards, backing vocals

== Discography ==
Studio albums

- You're a Woman, I'm a Machine (2004)
- The Physical World (2014)
- Outrage! Is Now (2017)
- Is 4 Lovers (2021)
- Private Lives (2027)

== See also ==
- Music of Canada
- Canadian rock
- List of Canadian musicians
- List of bands from Canada
- Category:Canadian musical groups
