= Mstrkrft =

Canadian electronic music duo

MSTRKRFT
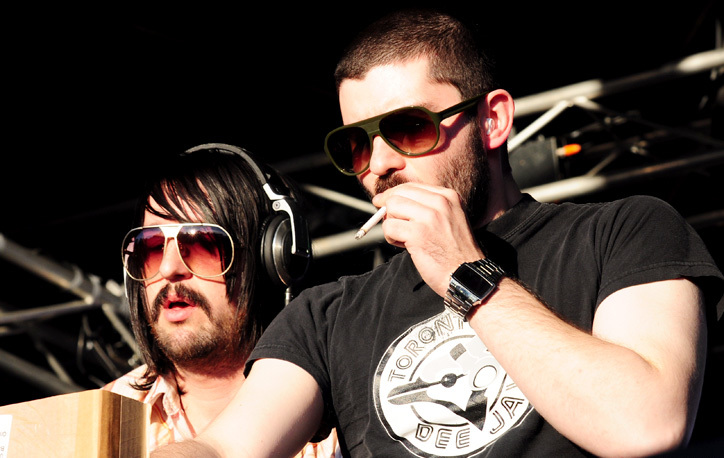
- Keeler and Al-P performing in Perth, 2009

Background information
- Origin: Toronto, Ontario, Canada
- Genres: Dance-punk, electro house
- Years active: 2005–present
- Labels: Last Gang, Ministry of Sound Australia, PIAS Recordings, Dim Mak, ORO Records
- Members: Jesse F. Keeler; Al-P
- Website: Official website

Mstrkrft (stylized as MSTRKRFT; disemvowelment of "master craft") is a Canadian electronic music duo from Toronto. The group was started in 2005 by Jesse F. Keeler of Death from Above and Al-P (Alex Puodziukas) formerly of the Mississauga, Ontario electropop group Girlsareshort. Al-P was also the producer for Death from Above's album You're a Woman, I'm a Machine as well as several of (Keeler's former band) Black Cat #13's records. The duo have been close friends, as well as work partners, for a long time. Mstrkrft also produced Die Mannequin's first EP, How to Kill, and Magneta Lane's second LP, Dancing With Daggers.

Mstrkrft has been commissioned to remix songs by such artists as Death From Above 1979, Justice, Kylie Minogue, Katy Perry, Bloc Party, Ayumi Hamasaki, Metric, Wolfmother, Annie, and The Kills.

== History ==
Prior to forming MSTRKRFT, Al-P and Keeler collaborated in the late 1990s, then lived in different cities as Al-P moved to New York and worked at the studios Sound on Sound and Chung King, and did some recording for Jay-Z and Wyclef Jean. Al-P was later in the electronic pop group Girlsareshort, with friend Daniel Zabawa. They released two albums, Contactkiss in 2002 and Earlynorthamerican in 2003, before disbanding. Al-P produced for Black Cat 13, Death from Above's album You're a Woman, I'm a Machine and The Sick Lipstick's Sting Sting Sting.

The band took out the vowels from their name in order to avoid trademark infringement with Mastercraft, a Canadian tools company. The 'C' was changed to a 'K' in order to maintain the pronunciation and image of the original name. Their first single was "Easy Love", released in 2006 on Last Gang Records. They released their second single, "Work On You", on 6 July. In contrast to the "Easy Love" music video, "Work On You" featured animated robots, similar to those found in classic cartoons (similar to Voltron and Transformers). The band has created remixes from a variety of other artists, ranging from Buck 65 to The Kills to Death from Above 1979.

Mstrkrft released their debut album, The Looks, on 18 July 2006 in the United States and 2 February 2007 in Britain. Keeler and Al-P told Eye Weekly weeks before the release of The Looks, that as the album was being finished, the planning stages for a follow-up record had already begun. Describing the upcoming album's new direction, Al-P said that the album would be "darker, underground disco and house with elements of American rock music."

The 2007 version of their song "Street Justice" was also released as a single. On the band's website message board, Keeler mentioned they were also working on a compilation album composed of their remixed tracks. "Street Justice" was also featured in Saints Row 2. "Neon Knights" was also featured on Need For Speed: Pro Street, their remix for Justice's "D.A.N.C.E." was featured in the film Meet the Spartans, and "Work on You" was featured in Dirt 2. Their song "Paris" was featured in a 2006 commercial for the online music store URGE. In 2007, Mstrkrft appeared at the WEMF World Electronic Music Festival. In September 2007, Mstrkrft performed at an Australian spring music festival "Parklife" in Brisbane. They performed their remix of the song "Woman" from Modular label mates Wolfmother. Andrew Stockdale of Wolfmother appeared on stage and sang live while Mstrkrft performed the remix.

In 2008, they released a mix CD with Z-Trip through Obeygiant.com. In conjunction with this CD, Obey offered the Artwork print, entitled Soundclash of the Titans. On 24 May 2008, Mstrkrft was featured on BBC Radio 1 show, The Essential Mix. Mstrkrft later performed at the 2008 Bonnaroo Music and Arts Festival, which included a diverse group of artists ranging from Metallica to Jack Johnson. In 2009, their remix of "Woman" by Wolfmother was featured in the film Lesbian Vampire Killers. On 17 March 2009, Mstrkrft released their second LP, Fist of God. Initial critical response was average, with major periodicals Spin, Rolling Stone, and Blender giving the album less-than-stellar reviews. The album features guest appearances by John Legend, E-40, N.O.R.E., and Lil' Mo, among others. In 2010, their song “Bounce’ featuring N.O.R.E. was featured in DJ Hero 2.

In 2011, they released two new singles, "Beards Again" and "Back in the USSA". "Beards Again" was later featured on the Injustice: Gods Among Us video game soundtrack in 2013. The band's third LP, Operator was released on 22 July 2016. The singles "Little Red Hen" and "Party Line" were released in March and May 2016 respectively to promote the album. Starting in May 2019, MSTRKRFT started releasing a single every month on ORO Records, including "City Violence", "La Chiaccherona", "All Night, All Night", "Buffalo Fat", and "Dorsia".

== Discography ==
=== Albums ===
Title	Details	Peak chart positions
Title	Details	US Dance
The Looks	Release date: 18 July 2006; Label: Last Gang; Formats: Digital download, CD	—
Fist of God	Release date: 17 March 2009; Label: Dim Mak; Formats: Digital download, CD	12
Operator	Release date: 22 July 2016; Label: Last Gang; Formats: Digital download, CD	17
Black Gloves	Release date: 30 October 2020	—
"—" denotes releases that did not chart

=== EPs ===
Year	Album
2016	Runaway, Vol. I (Remixes)
2016	Runaway, Vol. II (Remixes)
2019	Sunshine of My Life
2020	Spirit of Truth

=== Singles ===
Year	Single	Peak chart positions				Album
Year	Single	AUS	BEL (Fl)	UK	US Dance	Album
2006	"Easy Love"	—	—	—	—	The Looks
2006	"Work on You"	—	—	—	—	The Looks
2007	"Street Justice"	—	—	—	—	The Looks
2008	"Bounce"/"Vuvuvu"	75	—	—	14	Fist of God
2009	"Heartbreaker" (featuring John Legend)	63	53	50	—	Fist of God
2011	"Beards Again"	—	—	—	—	Non-album singles
2011	"Back in the USSA"	—	—	—	—	Non-album singles
2016	"Little Red Hen"	—	—	—	—	Operator
2016	"Party Line"	—	—	—	—	Operator
2016	"Priceless"	—	—	—	—	Operator
2016	"Runaway"	—	—	—	—	Operator
2019	"City Violence"	—	—	—	—	Non-album singles
2019	"La Chiaccherona"	—	—	—	—	Non-album singles
2019	"All Night, All Night"	—	—	—	—	Non-album singles
2019	"Buffalo Fat"	—	—	—	—	Non-album singles
2019	"Dorsia"	—	—	—	—	Non-album singles
2019	"Let Me See You Move"	—	—	—	—	Sunshine of My Life
2020	"Black Gloves"	—	—	—	—	Black Gloves
2020	"ALEXYSS"	—	—	—	—	Black Gloves
"—" denotes releases that did not chart
