= Juno Award for Video of the Year =

Annual Canadian award

The Juno Award for "Video of the Year" has been awarded since 1984, as recognition each year for the best music video made by a Canadian video director. The award is presented based on the Canadian nationality of the director, and can honour music videos made for non-Canadian musicians.

The award used to be called "Best Video".

== Winners ==
=== Best Video (1984–2002) ===
Year	Winner(s)	Video	Nominees	Ref.
1984	Rob Quartly	"Sunglasses at Night" (Corey Hart)	Robert Fresco – "Rise Up" (The Parachute Club); Rob Quartly – "Doesn't Really Matter" (Platinum Blonde); Rob Quartly – "Standing in the Dark" (Platinum Blonde); Rob Quartly – "I Want You Back" (Sherry Kean)	
1985	Rob Quartly	"A Criminal Mind" (Gowan)	Robert Bouvier – "Go for Soda" (Kim Mitchell); Rob Quartly – "Never Surrender" (Corey Hart); Rob Quartly – "You're a Strange Animal" (Gowan); Deborah Samuel and Lorraine Segato – "At the Feet of the Moon" (The Parachute Club)	
1986	Greg Masuak	"How Many (Rivers to Cross)" (Luba)	Rob Quartly – "Cosmetics" (Gowan); Rob Quartly – "Don't Forget Me (When I'm Gone)" (Glass Tiger); Rob Quartly – "Harmony" (Ian Thomas); Lorraine Segato – "Sexual Intelligence" (The Parachute Club)	
1987	Ron Berti	"Love Is Fire" (The Parachute Club)	Ron Berti – "Waiting for a Miracle" (Bruce Cockburn); Mark Gane and Martha Johnson – "Only You" (M+M); Nelu Ghiran – "I'm an Adult Now" (The Pursuit of Happiness); Stephen Surjik – "Should I See" (Frozen Ghost); Rob Quartly – "Easy to Tame" (Kim Mitchell)	
1989	Michael Buckley	"Try" (Blue Rodeo)	Ron Berti – "Wait for Me" (The Northern Pikes); James O'Mara and Kate Ryan – "Our Little Secret" (Art Bergmann); Donald Robertson – "Ingrid and the Footman" (Jane Siberry); Jean-Marc Pisapia – "Ordinary People" (The Box)	
1990	Cosimo Cavallaro	"Boomtown" (Andrew Cash)	Don Allan – "Watcha Do to My Body" (Lee Aaron); Chris Hooper, Kevin Kane, Robert Longevall – "All the Things I Wasn't" (The Grapes of Wrath); Greg Masuak – "Giving Away a Miracle" (Luba); Kari Skogland – "Waterline" (Spoons)	
1991	Joel Goldberg	"Drop the Needle" (Maestro Fresh-Wes)	Don Allan – "I Am a Wild Party" (Kim Mitchell); Don Allan – "I Wanna Know" (John James); Ron Berti – "She Ain't Pretty" (The Northern Pikes); Joel Goldberg – "Let Your Backbone Slide" (Maestro Fresh-Wes)	
1992	Phil Kates	"Into the Fire" (Sarah McLachlan)	Lyne Charlebois – "Political" (Spirit of the West); Alain DesRochers – "Dis-moi, dis-moi" (Mitsou); Dale Heslip – "Superman's Song" (Crash Test Dummies); David Storey – "Life is a Highway" (Tom Cochrane)	
1993	Curtis Wehrfritz	"Closing Time" (Leonard Cohen)	Lyne Charlebois – "Bohemia" (Mae Moore); Peter Henderson – "Locked in the Trunk of a Car" (The Tragically Hip); Curtis Wehrfritz – "No Regrets" (Tom Cochrane); Curtis Wehrfritz – "She La" (54-40)	
1994	Jeth Weinrich	"I Would Die for You" (Jann Arden)	Don Allan – "Rain Down on Me" (Blue Rodeo); Dale Heslip – "Mmm Mmm Mmm Mmm" (Crash Test Dummies); Curtis Wehrfritz – "The Future" (Leonard Cohen); Curtis Wehrfritz – "I Can See Clearly Now" (Holly Cole Trio)	
1995	Lyne Charlebois	"Tunnel of Trees" (Gogh Van Go)	Curtis Wehrfritz – "Bad Timing" (Blue Rodeo); Jeth Weinrich – "Blame Your Parents" (54-40); Jeth Weinrich – "Insensitive" (Jann Arden); Brenton Spencer – "Push" (Moist)	
1996	Jeth Weinrich	"Good Mother" (Jann Arden)	Alain DesRochers – "O Siem" (Susan Aglukark); Tim Hamilton – "The Ballad of Peter Pumpkinhead" (Crash Test Dummies); Stephen Scott – "Freedom" (Colin James); Curtis Wehrfritz – "Sister Awake" (The Tea Party)	
1997	Jeth Weinrich	"Burned Out Car" (Junkhouse)	Andrew MacNaughtan – "Run Runaway" (Great Big Sea); Stephen Scott and James Cooper – "Soaked" (The Killjoys); Curtis Wehrfritz – "Someone Who's Cool" (Odds); Eric Yealland – "Ahead by a Century" (The Tragically Hip)	
1998	Javier Aguilera	"Gasoline" (Moist)	Tim Hamilton – "A Little in Love" (Paul Brandt); Lisa Mann – "Elmo" (Holly McNarland); Bill Morrison – "Everything Is Automatic" (Matthew Good Band); Tony Pantages – "Pearly White" (Junkhouse)	
1999	Javier Aguilera	"Forestfire" (David Usher)	Ulf Buddensieck – "Lukey" (Great Big Sea and The Chieftains); Bill Morrison – "Apparitions" (Matthew Good Band); Floria Sigismondi – "Sweet Surrender" (Sarah McLachlan); Jeth Weinrich – "Wishing That" (Jann Arden)	
2000	Alanis Morissette	"So Pure" (Alanis Morissette)	Ulf Buddensieck – "Underground" (Moist); Marc Lostracco – "Strange Disease" (Prozzäk); Andrew MacNaughtan – "On the Scene" (Big Sugar); William Morrison – "Hello Time Bomb" (Matthew Good Band)	
2001	Rob Heydon	"Alive" (Edwin)	Micha Dahan – "Drag You Down" (Finger Eleven); Micha Dahan – "Thief" (Our Lady Peace); William Morrison – "The Future is X-Rated" (Matthew Good Band); William Morrison – "Load Me Up" (Matthew Good Band)	
2002	Sean Michael Turrell	"Jealous of Your Cigarette" (Hawksley Workman)	Oli Goldsmith – "In Repair" (Our Lady Peace); Josh Levy – "I Hear You Calling" (Gob); Stephen Scott – "Plumb Song" (Snow); Floria Sigismondi – "In My Secret Life" (Leonard Cohen)	

=== Video of the Year (2003–present) ===
Year	Winner(s)	Video	Nominees	Ref.
2003	Ante Kovac and Matthew Good	"Weapon" (Matthew Good)	Craig Bernard – "Black Black Heart" (David Usher); Craig Bernard and Danko Jones – "Lovercall" (Danko Jones); Micah Meisner – "Superstarr Pt. 0" (k-os); Christopher Mills – "PDA" (Interpol)	
2004	Floria Sigismondi	"Fighter" (Christina Aguilera)	Don Allan – "Heaven Only Knows" (k-os); Maxime Giroux – "Into Your Hideout" (Pilate); Christopher Mills – "Stars and Sons" (Broken Social Scene); Floria Sigismondi – "Untitled" (Sigur Rós)	
2005	The Love Movement, k-os and Micah Meisner	"B-Boy Stance" (k-os)	Stephen Scott – "Perfect Wave" (Barlow); Floria Sigismondi – "The End of the World" (The Cure); George Vale – "One Evening" (Feist); Benjamin Weinstein – "The Reasons" (The Weakerthans)	
2006	Micah Meisner	"Devil's Eyes" (Buck 65)	Ralph Dfouni, Brigitte Henry – "Con Toda Palabra" (Lhasa de Sela); Chris Grismer – "Rebellion (Lies)" (Arcade Fire); Plates Animation – "Neighborhood #3 (Power Out)" (Arcade Fire); Floria Sigismondi – "Bom Bom Bom" (Living Things)	
2007	Dave Pawsey and Jonathan Legris	"Bridge to Nowhere" (Sam Roberts)	k-os, Micah Meisner and Zeb Roc – "ElectriK HeaT: The Seekwill" (k-os); Drew Lightfoot – "Coast Is Clear" (In-Flight Safety); Floria Sigismondi – "Hurt" (Christina Aguilera); Sean Michael Turrell – "Devil in a Midnight Mass" (Billy Talent)	
2008	Christopher Mills	"C'mon" (Blue Rodeo)	Kyle Davison – "Shake Tramp" (Marianas Trench); Vincent Morriset – "Neon Bible" (Arcade Fire); Marc Ricciardelli – "Walls Fall Down" (Bedouin Soundclash); Sean Wainsteim – "Cheer It On" (Tokyo Police Club)	
2009	Anthony Seck	"Honey Honey" (Feist)	Davin Black – "Blond Kryptonite" (Saint Alvia); Wendy Morgan – "Going On" (Gnarls Barkley); Dave Pawsey – "Detroit '67" (Sam Roberts); Dave Pawsey – "Them Kids" (Sam Roberts)	
2010	Marc Ricciardelli	"Little Bit of Red" (Serena Ryder)	Harv Glazer – "Anybody Listening" (Classified); Ben Steiger-Levine – "Heavens to Purgatory" (The Most Serene Republic); Ben Steiger-Levine – "Mr. Hurricane" (Beast); WeWereMonkeys – "It's Okay" (Land of Talk)	
2011	Kyle Davison	"Perfect" (Hedley)	Benjamin Lussier – "Chargez!" (Ariel); Adam Makarenko and Alan Poon – "Forced to Love" (Broken Social Scene); Michael Maxxis – "Saint Veronika" (Billy Talent); Christopher Mills – "Collect Call" (Metric)	
2012	Mike Roberts	"Rumbleseat" (The Sadies)	Jon Busby – "Rows of Houses" (Dan Mangan); José Lourenço – "Stamp" (The Rural Alberta Advantage); Michael Maxxis – "Good Day at the Races" (Hollerado); John JP Poliquin – "The Stand" (Mother Mother)	
2013	Director X	"HYFR" (Drake)	Margaret Malandruccolo – "Testify" (Alan Doyle); Margaret Malandruccolo – "Fire It Up" (Johnny Reid); Sean Wainsteim – "Little Boxes" (Walk Off the Earth); WeWereMonkeys – "Little Talks" (Of Monsters and Men)	
2014	Matt Barnes	"Feeling Good" (The Sheepdogs)	Agathe Bray-Bourret – "Je t'aime comme tu es" (Daniel Bélanger); Briin Bernstein and Daniel AM Rosenberg – "Friend of Mine" (D-Sisive); John Poliquin – "Anything" (Hedley); WeWereMonkeys – "King and Lionheart" (Of Monsters and Men)	
2015	Kiesza, Blayre Ellestad, Rami Afuni and Ljuba Castot	"Hideaway" (Kiesza)	Dane Collison – "Preach" (SonReal); Grandson & Son – "Lost You" (Zeds Dead feat. Twin Shadow); Natalie Rae Robison – "Not Up to Me" (Kandle); Jeremy Schaulin-Rioux and Chandler Levack – "Guilt Trip" (PUP)	
2016	Xavier Dolan	"Hello" (Adele)	Peter Huang – "For the Town" (SonReal); Eva Michon – "Virgins" (Death from Above 1979); Jeremy Schaulin-Rioux and Chandler Levack – "Dark Days" (PUP); Philip Sportel – "Avalanche" (Kalle Mattson)	
2017	Claire Boucher	"Kill v Maim" (Grimes)	Jodeb – "Killa" (Wiwek/Skrillex); Martin C. Pariseau – "Lite Spots" (Kaytranada); Yassin "Narcy" Alsalman – "R.E.D." (A Tribe Called Red feat. Yasiin Bey, Narcy & Black Bear); Justin Stephenson – "The Stranger" (Gord Downie)	
2018	Claire Boucher	"Venus Fly" (Grimes)	Christopher Mills – "Leaving the Table" (Leonard Cohen); Emma Higgins – "The Drugs" (Mother Mother); Peter Huang – "Gatekeeper" (Jessie Reyez); Shane Cunningham and Mark Myers – "Knocking at the Door" (Arkells)	
2019	Ali Eisner	"No Depression" (Bahamas)	Andrew De Zen – "Places" (Alaskan Tapes); Andy Hines – "Powerless" (Classified); Ben Knechtel – "Hang Ups" (Scott Helman); Peter Huang – "Have a Nice Day" (SonReal)	
2020	Sarah Legault	"Little Star" (iskwē)	Caraz – "Bun Dem" (Sarahmée); Johnny Jansen – "Record Shop" (Said the Whale); Le GED – "Back Off" (Laurence Nerbonne); Jonathan Robert – "Topographe" (Corridor)	
2021	Emma Higgins	"No One's in the Room" (Jessie Reyez)	Ben Knechtel – "Wait No More" (Scott Helman); Brittney Canda, Vincent René-Lortie – "Wrap Me Up" (Sheenah Ko); Les Solis, Peter Huang – "Intruders" (Jessie Reyez); Nick DenBoer – "Pomegranate" (deadmau5 and the Neptunes)	
2022	Xavier Dolan	"Easy on Me" (Adele)	Vincent René-Lortie – "La nuée" (Simon Leoza); Adrian Villagomez – Ariane Roy, "Ta main" (Ariane Roy); Shan Vincent de Paul and Kalainithan Kalaichelvan – "Neeye Oli" (Shan Vincent de Paul, Navz-47 and Santhosh Narayanan); Norman Wong – "Meaningless" (Charlotte Cardin)	
2023	Floria Sigismondi	"Unholy" (Sam Smith and Kim Petras)	Emma Higgins – "Fraud" (Jessie Reyez); Karena Evans – "Have Mercy" (Chlöe); Mayumi Yoshida – "Different Than Before" (Amanda Sum); Sterling Larose – "Remember Me for Me" (SonReal and Lily Moore)	
2024	Ethan Tobman	"Demons" (Allison Russell)	Andrew De Zen – "Of Woods and Seas" (Alaskan Tapes); Jordan Clarke – "onetwostep" (des hume feat. juicelover); Sterling Larose – "DAMN RIGHT" (Snotty Nose Rez Kids); Sterling Larose and Zachary Vague – "feral canadian scaredy cat" (young friend)	
2025	Mustafa	"Name of God" (Mustafa)	Jonah Haber – "Nasty" (Tinashe); Winston Hacking – "Jump Cut" (Corridor); Jorden Lee – "Gravity" (Sean Leon); Adrian Villagomez – "Human" (Apashe & Wasiu)	
2026	Karena Evans	"Luther" (Kendrick Lamar and SZA)	Winston Hacking – "Listen2me" (Foxwarren); Shiraz Higgins – "OK!" (Haviah Mighty); Adrian Villagomez – "Bellatores" (Apashe & Vladimir Cauchemar); Adrian Villagomez – "Driving" (Eddie Benjamin)	
