= List of awards and nominations received by Billy Talent =

Billy Talent awards and nominations
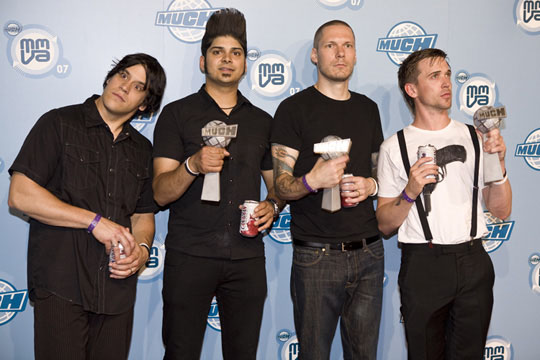
- Billy Talent at the 2007 MuchMusic Video Awards. From left to right: Jonathan Gallant, Ian D'Sa, Aaron Solowoniuk, and Benjamin Kowalewicz
Awards and nominations
Award	Wins	Nominations
Echo	2	2
Juno	7	22
Much	11	34
CASBY Awards	6	6

Totals (Note: Certain award groups do not simply award one winner. They acknowledge several different recipients, have runners-up, and have third place. Since this is a specific recognition and is different from losing an award, runner-up mentions are considered wins in this award tally. For simplification and to avoid errors, each award in this list has been presumed to have had a prior nomination.)
- Wins: 26
- Nominations: 64

Billy Talent is a Canadian rock band formed in 1993 in Mississauga, Ontario. The band consists of Benjamin Kowalewicz (vocals), Ian D'Sa (guitar and vocals), Jonathan Gallant (bass and vocals), and Aaron Solowoniuk (drums and percussion). Billy Talent has released five studio albums Billy Talent (2003), Billy Talent II (2006), Billy Talent III (2009), Dead Silence (2012), and Afraid of Heights (2016). Billy Talent and Billy Talent II have been certified by the Canadian Recording Industry Association as triple platinum and double platinum respectively.

Two of the band's albums have reached the top 10 on the Canadian Albums Chart: Billy Talent peaked at number six and Billy Talent II peaked at number one. Billy Talent has received a significant amount of recognition in Canada, winning eleven awards from 34 nominations at the MuchMusic Video Awards and seven awards from twenty-two nominations at the Juno Awards. The band was also nominated at the MuchMusic Video Awards every year from 2004 to 2011. Overall, Billy Talent has received twenty-six awards from 64 nominations.

== CASBY Awards ==
The CASBY Awards are awarded for independent and alternative music, and are presented annually by CFNY, a Toronto radio station. Billy Talent has received six awards from six nominations.

Year	Nominee / work	Award	Result
2003	"Try Honesty"	Favorite New Single	Won
2004	"River Below"	Favorite New Single	Won
2004	Billy Talent	Favorite New Album	Won
2006	"Devil In A Midnight Mass"	Favorite New Single	Won
2006	Billy Talent II	Favorite New Album	Won
2016	Afraid of Heights	Favorite New Album	Won

== ECHO Awards ==
The ECHO Awards is a German annual music awards ceremony established by the Deutsche Phono-Akademie. Billy Talent has received two awards from two nominations.

Year	Nominee / work	Award	Result
2007	Billy Talent	Best Newcomer International	Won
2007	Billy Talent	Best Rock/Alternative International	Won

== Juno Awards ==
The Juno Awards are presented by the Canadian Academy of Recording Arts and Sciences. Billy Talent has received seven awards from twenty-two nominations.

Year	Nominee / work	Award	Result
2004	Billy Talent	Best New Group of the Year	Won
2004	Billy Talent	Rock Album of the Year	Nominated
2004	"Try Honesty"	Single of the Year	Nominated
2005	Billy Talent	Group of the Year	Won
2005	Billy Talent	Best Album of the Year	Won
2005	"River Below"	Single of the Year	Nominated
2007	Billy Talent	Group of the Year	Won
2007	Billy Talent II	Rock Album of the Year	Won
2007	Billy Talent II	Album of the Year	Nominated
2007	"Devil in a Midnight Mass"	Video of the Year	Nominated
2007	"Devil in a Midnight Mass"	Single of the Year	Nominated
2008	666	Music DVD of the Year	Won
2010	Billy Talent	Group of the Year	Nominated
2010	Billy Talent III	Rock Album of the Year	Won
2010	Billy Talent III	Album of the Year	Nominated
2010	"Rusted from the Rain"	Single of the Year	Nominated
2011	"Saint Veronika"	Video of the Year	Nominated
2013	Billy Talent	Group of the Year	Nominated
2013	Dead Silence	Rock Album of the Year	Nominated
2013	"Viking Death March"	Single of the Year	Nominated
2017	Billy Talent	Group of the Year	Nominated
2017	Afraid of Heights	Rock Album of the Year	Nominated

== MuchMusic Video Awards ==
The MuchMusic Video Awards is an annual awards ceremony presented by the Canadian music video channel MuchMusic. Billy Talent has received 10 awards from 34 nominations. They have also made history by having more nominations than any other artist

Year	Nominee / work	Award	Result
2004	"Try Honesty"	Best Rock Video	Won
2004	"Try Honesty"	Best Video	Nominated
2004	"Try Honesty"	Best Cinematography	Nominated
2004	"Try Honesty"	Best Post-Production	Nominated
2004	"Try Honesty"	Best Director	Nominated
2004	Billy Talent	People's Choice: Favourite Canadian Group	Nominated
2005	"River Below"	Best Video	Won
2005	"River Below"	Best Rock Video	Won
2005	"River Below"	Best Post-Production	Nominated
2005	"Nothing to Lose"	Best Video	Nominated
2005	"Nothing to Lose"	Best Rock Video	Nominated
2005	"Nothing to Lose"	Best Cinematography	Nominated
2005	"River Below", "Nothing to Lose"	Best Director	Nominated
2005	Billy Talent	People's Choice: Favourite Canadian Group	Nominated
2006	"Devil In A Midnight Mass"	Best Video	Nominated
2006	"Devil In A Midnight Mass"	Best Director	Nominated
2006	"Devil In A Midnight Mass"	Best Post-Production	Nominated
2006	"Devil In A Midnight Mass"	Best Cinematography	Nominated
2006	"Devil In A Midnight Mass"	Best Rock Video	Nominated
2007	"Fallen Leaves"	Best Video	Won
2007	"Fallen Leaves"	MuchLoud Best Rock Video	Won
2007	"Devil In A Midnight Mass"	People's Choice: Favorite Canadian Group	Won
2007	"Red Flag"	Best Director	Nominated
2007	"Red Flag"	Best Cinematography	Nominated
2008	"Surrender"	People's Choice: Favorite Canadian Group	Nominated
2009	"Rusted From the Rain"	International Video of the Year by a Canadian	Won
2010	"Saint Veronika"	Director of the Year	Won
2010	Devil on My Shoulder	MuchLOUD Rock Video of the Year	Won
2010	Devil on My Shoulder	Video of the Year	Nominated
2011	"Diamond on a Landmine"	MuchLOUD Rock Video of the Year	Nominated
2013	"Surprise Surprise"	MuchLOUD Rock Video of the Year	Nominated
2013	"Surprise Surprise"	Post-Production of the Year	Won
