= Sean Brown (designer) =

Canadian creative director (born 1986)

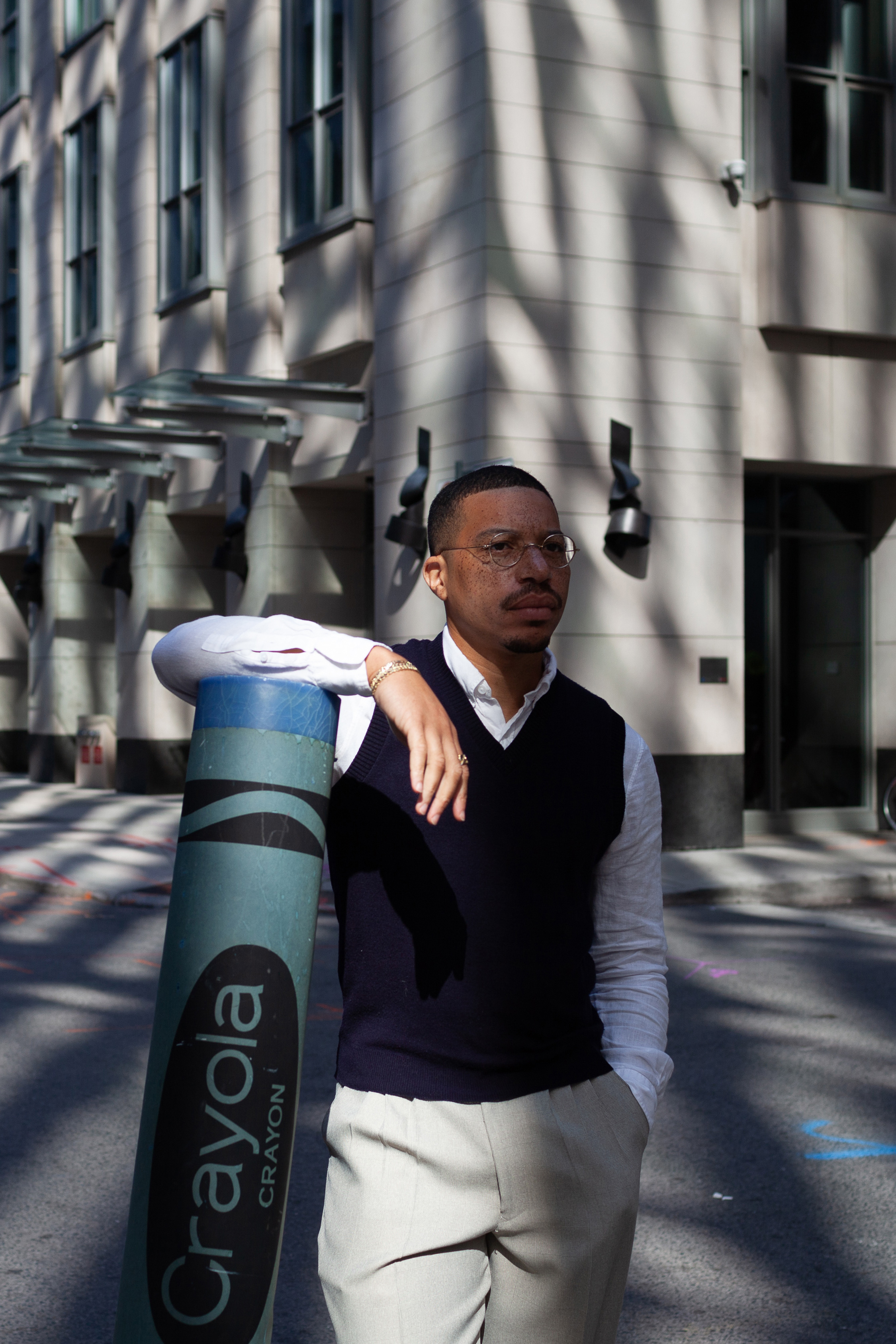
- Born: Toronto, Ontario
- Citizenship: Canada
- Education: International Academy of Design and Technology Toronto
- Occupations: Creative director, Designer
- Website: byseanbrown.com

Sean Brown (born 1986) is a Canadian creative director, photographer, and designer based in Toronto. He is co-founder of Curves by Sean Brown, a line of contemporary homeware and lifestyle accessories. Brown is also known for his work as the former creative director for R&B singer Daniel Caesar, for which he received a Juno Award nomination.

== Early life ==
Brown was born in Toronto, Ontario to parents of Jamaican descent. During his teenage years, he reportedly developed an interest in fashion, often sketching clothing designs and screen-printing t-shirts. He attended the International Academy of Design and Technology in Toronto before dropping out and pursuing independent creative ventures.

== Career ==
=== The Art of Reuse ===
In 2010, Brown launched ‘Interim' by The Art of Reuse, a conceptual vintage retail project. The project functioned as a traveling pop-up shop in several North American cities, curating second-hand clothing with a focus on luxury vintage and sustainable fashion.

=== NEEDS&WANTS ===
In 2013, Brown founded NEEDS&WANTS, a Toronto-based menswear label. The brand became known for its signature asymmetry and varsity jackets. Brown expanded the brand's scope beyond apparel by launching a biannual print publication titled NEEDS&WANTS Paper, which covered design, architecture, and travel. To retail the collection, Brown reportedly designed a mobile store built from a repurposed 8x20 ft shipping container, which utilized mirrors and minimalist design to create what was reported as an "immersive" retail environment.

=== Creative Direction ===
Beginning in 2015, Brown served as a creative director for Canadian singer Daniel Caesar. Brown, alongside collaborator Keavan Yazdani, photographed and designed the album artwork for Caesar's debut studio album Freudian (2017) and his follow-up Case Study 01 (2019). For his work on the art direction of Freudian, Brown received a nomination for Recording Package of the Year at the 2018 Juno Awards. He also co-directed the visual accompaniment Freudian, A Visual, which won the Audience Award at the 2018 Prism Prize.

=== Curves by Sean Brown ===
In July 2018, Brown debuted his fine art practice with a solo exhibition titled Curves at the Peter MacKendrick Gallery in Toronto. The interactive show featured photo essays and objects that displayed his source materials as art. Subsequent installations of the exhibition were held at the Letter Bet in Montreal and the Royal Ontario Museum (ROM) in Toronto.

In 2020, during the COVID-19 pandemic, Brown co-founded the brand Curves by Sean Brown with partners Iva Golubovic and Zachary Aburaneh. Expanding into home goods, the brand gained viral popularity for its collection of hand-tufted rugs shaped like compact discs (CDs), replicating iconic hip-hop and R&B album covers.

The product line has since expanded to include furniture, lighting, and leisurewear stocked by international retailers including SSENSE and Selfridges.

=== Other work and collaborations ===
Brown has reportedly collaborated with various international brands on design and creative campaigns, including RIMOWA, Spotify, Appleton Estate, Salomon, and Porter Airlines. In 2022, Brown co-founded sq ft (square feet) Magazine with Iva Golubovic, a publication that profiles artists and the spaces they occupy. He also launched HYPATIA, his ongoing architectural exploration that focuses on harmony between human life and the built environment.
