= MuchMusic Video Award for Best Director =

The following is a list of the MuchMusic Video Awards winners for "Best Director".

MuchMusic Video Award for Best Director winners
| Year | Artist | Video | Director | Ref. |
|---|---|---|---|---|
| 1990 | John James | "I Wanna Know" | Don Allen | |
| 1991 | The Grapes of Wrath | "I Am Here" | Curtis Wehrfritz | |
| 1992 | Tom Cochrane | "No Regrets" | Curtis Wehrfritz | |
| 1993 | Jann Arden | "I Would Die For You" | Jeth Weinrich | |
| 1994 | Blue Rodeo | "Hasn't Hit Me Yet" | Curtis Wehrfritz | |
| 1994 | 54-40 | "Blame Your Parents" | Jeth Weinrich | |
| 1994 | Spirit of the West | "And If Venice Is Sinking" | Eric Yealland | |
| 1994 | Our Lady Peace | "Starseed" | George Vale | |
| 1994 | Rush | "Stick It Out" | Sam Bayer | |
| 1995 | Jann Arden | "Insensitive" | Jeth Weinrich | |
| 1996 | The Tea Party | "Sister Awake" | Curtis Wehrfritz | |
| 1997 | Moist | "Tangerine" | Stephen Scott | |
| 1998 | Matthew Good Band | "Apparitions" | Bill Morrison | |
| 1999 | Alanis Morissette | "Unsent" | Alanis Morissette | |
| 2000 | The Tragically Hip | "My Music at Work" | Bruce McCulloch | |
| 2001 | Our Lady Peace | "In Repair" | Oli Goldsmith | |
| 2002 | Swollen Members featuring Moka Only | "Fuel Injected" | Wendy Morgan | |
| 2003 | Treble Charger | "Hundred Million" | Wendy Morgan | |
| 2004 | Sam Roberts | "Hard Road" | Kyle Davison | |
| 2005 | k-os | "Man I Used to Be" | The Love Movement featuring Micah J. Meisner and k-os | |
| 2006 | Kardinal Offishall featuring Ray Robinson | "Everyday (Rudebwoy)" | RT! | |
| 2007 | George | "Lie to Me" | RT! | |
| 2008 | Hedley | "For the Nights I Can't Remember" | Kevin De Freitas | |
| 2009 | Marianas Trench | "Cross My Heart" | Colin Minihan | |
| 2010 | Billy Talent | "Saint Veronika" | Michael Maxxis | |
| 2011 | You Say Party | "Lonely's Lunch" | Sean Wainsteim | |
| 2012 | Danny Fernandes featuring Josh Ramsay and Belly | "Hit Me Up" | Marc André Debruyne | |
| 2013 | Drake | "Started from the Bottom" | Director X | |
| 2014 | Thugli | "Run This" | Amos Le Blanc and Ohji Inoue | |
| 2015 | The Weeknd | "Often" | Sam Pilling | |
| 2016 | Drake | "Hotline Bling" | Director X | |
| 2017 | A Tribe Called Red featuring Black Bear | "Stadium Pow Wow" | Kevan Funk | |
| 2018 | Drake | "God's Plan" | Karena Evans | |
