= Adrian Villagomez =

Adrian Villagomez is a Canadian music video director from Montreal, Quebec. He is most noted as the 2023 winner of the Special Achievement Award from the Prism Prize, Canada's annual award for music videos.

Born and raised in Montreal to a Peruvian father and a québécois mother, he was a violin player in his high school orchestra before studying photography at Concordia University, and began his career as a concert photographer before beginning to direct music videos.

== Awards ==
Award	Year	Category	Work	Result	Ref.
Juno Awards	2022	Video of the Year	"Ta main" (Ariane Roy)	Nominated	
Juno Awards	2025	Video of the Year	"Human" (Apashe & Wasiu)	Nominated	
Juno Awards	2026	Video of the Year	"Bellatores" (Apashe & Vladimir Cauchemar)	Nominated	
Juno Awards	2026	Video of the Year	"Driving" (Eddie Benjamin)	Nominated	
Prism Prize	2023	Special Achievement		Won	
Prism Prize	2023	Video of the Year	"Passepied" (Jean-Michel Blais)	Nominated	
Prism Prize	2023	Video of the Year	"Here It Goes Again" (MorMor)	Nominated	
Prism Prize	2024	Video of the Year	"Revenge of the Orchestra" (Apashe feat. Magugu)	Nominated	
Prism Prize	2024	Video of the Year	"My Mind at Ease" (Dominique Fils-Aimé)	Nominated	
UK Music Video Awards	2022	Best Alternative Video, International	"Passepied" (Jean-Michel Blais)	Won	
UK Music Video Awards	2023	Best R&B/Soul Video, International	"My Mind at Ease" (Dominique Fils-Aimé)	Nominated	
UK Music Video Awards	2024	Best Dance/Electronic Video, International	"Revenge of the Orchestra" (Apashe feat. Magugu)	Nominated	
