= Winston Hacking =

Winston Hacking is a Canadian animator and music video director.

== Accolades ==
He is most noted as a two-time Juno Award nominee for Video of the Year, receiving nods at the Juno Awards of 2025 for Corridor's "Jump Cut", and at the Juno Awards of 2026 for Foxwarren's "Listen2Me".

He previously won the Prism Prize Audience Award in 2017 for Andy Shauf's "The Magician", and was shortlisted in 2022 for BadBadNotGood's "Timid, Intimidating".

== Career ==
His other works have included music videos for Flying Lotus, Washed Out, Run the Jewels and Animal Collective, and the 2018 short film Erodium Thunk.

== See also ==
- Independent animation
- Chillwave
- Collage film
