= Stephen Reid (writer) =

Canadian criminal and writer

- Born: March 13, 1950; Massey, Ontario, Canada
- Died: June 12, 2018 (aged 68); Haida Gwaii, British Columbia, Canada
- Occupations: bank robber, writer
- Spouse: Susan Musgrave (m. 1986)

Stephen Reid (March 13, 1950 – June 12, 2018) was a Canadian criminal and writer, who was a member of the notorious Stopwatch Gang and was also convicted twice of bank robbery. Reid served time in over 20 prisons in Canada and the United States.

Reid was born in Massey, Ontario, on March 13, 1950, and is of Irish and Ojibwa descent. Reid, working with fellow Canadians Paddy Mitchell, and Lionel Wright stole approximately $15 million—mainly in the 1970s and 1980s—from more than 140 banks and other sites across Canada and the U.S. The Stopwatch Gang, which was famous for its speedy heists—including the 1974 robbery of $750,000 in gold bars from the Ottawa Airport—was named for a stopwatch Reid wore around his neck. They successfully completed a $750,000 gold heist in 1974 from the Ottawa airport. They were arrested after that robbery and all escaped from prison by 1979. Later in 1980, Reid was arrested in Arizona, and began writing in 1984 while serving a 21-year prison sentence at the Kent Institution in Agassiz, British Columbia. During his first sentence, he submitted a manuscript to Susan Musgrave, then writer-in-residence at the University of Waterloo. Thus developed an ongoing correspondence, and they married in 1986 at Kent. He published his first novel, Jackrabbit Parole, that year.

Reid was released on full parole in June 1987. He lived with Musgrave and her daughters in Sidney, British Columbia, teaching creative writing at Camosun College and working as a youth counsellor in the Northwest Territories. He became addicted to heroin and cocaine and, in June 1999, committed another bank robbery, in Victoria, British Columbia, and was sentenced to 18 years in prison. He was granted parole in February 2014.

Shortly before his 1999 robbery, he had a small acting role in the film Four Days.

Reid was the subject of a 2007 National Film Board of Canada documentary film, Inside Time, which was the recipient of a 2008 Golden Sheaf Award for social/political documentary.

Reid won the 2013 Victoria Book Award for his second work, A Crowbar in the Buddhist Garden: Writing from Prison.

Reid died in hospital near his home on Haida Gwaii on June 12, 2018. Susan Musgrave issue a statement saying he had died from “pulmonary edema, and third-degree heart block.”

His archives, along with his wife's, are held by the William Ready Division of Archives and Research Collections at McMaster University.

== See also ==
- Roger Caron
