= Paddy Mitchell =

Canadian bank robber (1942–2007)

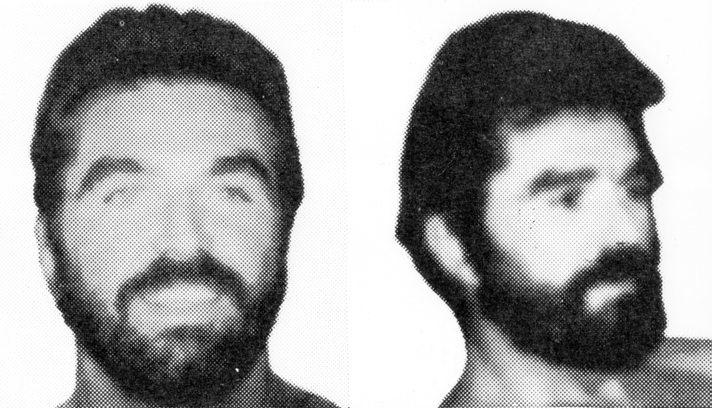

FBI Ten Most Wanted Fugitive
- Charges: Armed Robbery: Escaped

Description
- Born: Patrick Michael Mitchell; June 26, 1942; Ottawa, Ontario, Canada
- Died: January 14, 2007 (aged 64); Butner, North Carolina, U.S.
- Children: 2

Status
- Convictions: Bank robbery
- Penalty: 65 years' imprisonment
- Added: November 23, 1990
- Caught: February 22, 1994
- Number: 432
- Captured

Patrick Michael Mitchell (also known as Paddy; June 26, 1942 – January 14, 2007) of Ottawa, Ontario, was leader of the notorious "Stopwatch Gang" of bank robbers. Mitchell was on the Federal Bureau of Investigation's most wanted list for the Stopwatch Gang's bank robberies across the United States.

== Background ==
Mitchell, working with fellow Canadians Stephen Reid, and Lionel Wright stole approximately $15 million—mainly in the 1970s and 1980s—from more than 140 banks and other sites across Canada and the U.S. The Stopwatch Gang, which was famous for its speedy heists, was named for a stopwatch Reid wore around his neck. They successfully completed a $750,000 gold heist in 1974 from the Ottawa airport. They were arrested after that robbery and all escaped from prison by 1979. They were known for non-violent methods and politeness to victims. The gang's story is recorded in several television documentaries and books, including Mitchell's autobiography, This Bank Robber's Life, which he wrote from prison.

He escaped from prison three times, one of the times he purposely induced heart-attack related symptoms by consuming enough nicotine from cigarettes; he was taken to hospital, having gang members pick him up in a stolen ambulance. The gang's biggest heist took place at a Bank of America branch in San Diego on September 23, 1980, when the US$283,000 they stole set a San Diego record. On October 31, 1980, FBI agents arrested Wright and Mitchell in the Sedona, Arizona area near Slide Rock State Park. Wright and Mitchell had a hideout in Forest Houses in Oak Creek Canyon and Mitchell rented a house about three miles north.

Mitchell later moved to the Philippines for 15 years, where he remarried and had a son. During that time, he often flew back to the United States. While at large, Mitchell's case was featured on Unsolved Mysteries. On November 23, 1990, Mitchell was added to the Federal Bureau of Investigation's most wanted list. Finally, on February 22, 1994, he was arrested just after a solo robbery in Southaven, Mississippi, convicted of bank robbery, and sentenced to a 65-year prison sentence.

Mitchell was diagnosed with lung cancer in 2006, and died on January 14, 2007, in the Federal Medical Center in Butner, N.C. in the prison hospital at the age of 64.

== See also ==
- List of bank robbers and robberies
