= Susan Musgrave =

Canadian poet and children's writer (born 1951)

- Born: March 12, 1951 (age 75); Santa Cruz, California
- Occupations: Author, poet
- Spouse: Stephen Reid (m. 1986; died 2018)
- Writing career
- Genres: Poetry, fiction, non fiction, children's literature

Susan Musgrave (born March 12, 1951) is a Canadian poet novelist, essayist, editor, cookbook writer and children's writer. She was born in Santa Cruz, California, to Canadian parents, and lives in British Columbia and spends part of every year in the west of Ireland where she lived in the early 70s. Her roots are Anglo-Irish; her great-great-great grandfather, Sir Richard Musgrave, wrote “Memoirs of the Irish Rebellion of 1798.

Musgrave left school at 14, and had her first works published at 16. In 1986, at a wedding held in prison, she married Stephen Reid, a writer, convicted bank robber and former member of the infamous Stopwatch Gang. Their relationship was chronicled in 1999 in the CBC Life and Times series, The Poet and the Bandit.

She has two daughters, Charlotte Nelson Musgrave (with Paul Oscar Nelson) and Sophie Musgrave Reid (with Stephen Reid). Sophie Musgrave Reid died in 2021 of a Fentanyl overdose.

She teaches poetry at the University of British Columbia's School of Creative Writing Master of Fine Arts program.

Musgrave's archives are held by the William Ready Division of Archives and Research Collections at McMaster University.

Her book Exculpatory Lilies was shortlisted for the 2023 Griffin Poetry Prize as well as the Governor General’s Award for Poetry, and the Derek Walcott Poetry Prize.

== Awards ==
- Exculpatory Lilies shortlisted for Governor General’s Award for Poetry, 2023
- Exculpatory Lilies shortlisted for the 2022 Derek Walcott Poetry Prize
- Honorable Mention, Exculpatory Lilies, 1st Annual Sunshine Coast Writers and Editors Society Book Awards for BC Authors 2023
- Tears of Things Wins Gold at Magazine Awards for Best Poetry, 2023
- Shortlisted Griffin Poetry Prize, June, 2023, for Exculpatory Lilies.
- George Woodcock Lifetime Achievement Award, 2023
- Exculpatory Lilies Globe and Mail 100 Best Books of the Year, 2022
- Longlisted Frontier OPEN, top 3% of submissions: “The Spinning Want the Still to Spin,” 2021
- Short-listed, Fish Poetry Prize (Ireland) May 2021 “The Colour of Water”
- First Prize, Arc’s Award of Awesomeness, September 2020
- Third Prize, Fish Poetry Prize (Ireland) Judge Billy Collins, May 2020 for poem “Wild and Alone”
- Gold winner, Taste Canada Awards for A Taste of Haida Gwaii November 14, 2016:
- Bill Duthie Bookseller’s Choice Award (BC Book Awards) for A Taste of Haida Gwaii April 30, 2016
- Matt Cohen Award: In Celebration of a Writing Life (presented by the Writer’s Trust) 2014
- Toronto Public Library 2012 First & Best Booklist in Canadian books for children from birth to age five: Kiss, Tickle, Cuddle, Hug
- Second Annual CBC Bookie Awards Finalist, 2012
- Accenti Writing Contest, April 14, 2012 “Silent in its Shout” (personal essay) first prize ($1000)
- Spirit Bear Award, 2012: The tribute recognizes the significance of a vital and enduring contribution to the poetry of the Pacific Northwest, and is presented every two years.
- B.C. Civil Liberties Association 50th Anniversary Award for contributions in the area of the arts, for writing, 2012
- University of Victoria 50th-Anniversary Prize: The Malahat Review Second Prize, 2012: “Personal Effects”
- Lush Triumphant Literary Awards Competition (SubTerran Magazine) First Prize, 2012, “The Goodness of this World”
- Origami Dove, Shortlisted for Governor General’s Award for Poetry, 2011.
- Origami Dove Globe and Mail 100 Best Books of the Year, 2011
- Lifetime Achievement Award, Pandora Collective, Vancouver, B.C. 2010
- Short-listed: ForeWord Magazine Book of the Year Award for children’s/YA non-fiction, US, for Nerves Out Loud: Critical Moments in the Lives of Seven Teen Girls (Annick Press, series editor) 2002
- Short-listed for the Norman Fleck Award or Nerves Out Loud: Critical Moments in the Lives of Seven Teen Girls (Annick Press, series editor) 2002
- Honourable Mention Dorothy Livesay Poetry Prize, 2000, for Things That Keep and Do Not Change
- National Magazine Award for Personal Journalism, “Visitor’s Rites,” in Saturday Night, 2000
- Winner, B.C. Book Award for Breaking the Surface (Sono Nis). Editor. 2000
- Panty Lines Anthology: First Prize for “Ice-Age Lingerie,” 1999
- Dreams are More Real than Bathtubs (Orca) selected by The Canadian Children’s Book Centre, Our Choice 1999-2000
- Vicky Metcalf Short Story Editor’s Award, 1996
- CBC/Saturday Night/Tilden Award for Poetry, 1996 (First Prize)
- Short-listed for the Stephen Leacock Award for Humour, for Musgrave Landing: Musings on the Writing Life
- Readers’ Choice Award for poems published in the Winter 1993 edition of Prairie Schooner
- First Prize b.p. nichol Poetry Chapbook Award for In the Small Hours of the Rain: Reference West, 1991
- Short-listed for the Stephen Leacock Award for Humour, for Great Musgrave, 1990
- P. Adams Short Fiction Award (Third Prize) for “The Remains Of Edward’s”, published in Negative Capability, Mobile, Alabama,1989
- A Man to Marry, A Man to Bury, short-listed for Governor General’s Award for Poetry, 1979
- DuMaurier Magazine Award (silver), 1992
- Finalist In Seal First Novel Competition, McClelland & Stewart, for The Charcoal Burners, 1980
- The Charcoal Burners short-listed for Governor General’s Award, 1981
- Grave-Dirt and Selected Strawberries short-listed for Governor General’s Award, 1974

== Bibliography ==
=== Poetry ===
- Songs of the Sea-Witch — 1970
- Entrance of the Celebrant — 1972
- Grave-Dirt and Selected Strawberries — 1973
- Gullband Thought Measles was a Happy Ending — 1974
- The Impstone — 1976
- Selected Strawberries and Other Poems — 1977
- Kiskatinaw Songs — 1978
- Becky Swan's Book — 1978
- A Man to Marry, a Man to Bury — 1979 (nominated for a Governor General's Award)
- Tarts and Muggers — 1982
- Cocktails at the Mausoleum — 1985
- The Embalmer's Art — 1991
- Forcing the Narcissus — 1994
- Things That Keep and Do Not Change — 1999
- What the Small Day Cannot Hold: Collected Poems 1970–1985 — 2000
- When the World Is Not Our Home: Selected Poems 1985–2000 — 2009
- Obituary of Light: The Sangan River Meditations — 2009
- Origami Dove — 2011
- Exculpatory Lilies — 2022
- Hunger: The Poetry of Susan Musgrave, selected with an introduction by Micheline Maylor, 2025

=== Fiction ===
- The Charcoal Burners — 1980 (nominated for a Governor General's Award)
- The Dancing Chicken — 1987
- Cargo of Orchids — 2000
- Given — 2012

=== Non-fiction ===
- Great Musgrave — 1989
- Musgrave Landing: Musings on the Writing Life — 1994
- You're in Canada Now... Motherfucker: A Memoir of Sorts — 2005
- A Taste of Haida Gwaii: Food Gathering and Feasting at the Edge of the World — 2015

=== Children's literature ===
- Gullband — 1980
- Hag Head — 1980
- Kestrel and Leonardo — 1990
- Dreams Are More Real than Bathtubs — 1998
- Kiss, Tickle, Cuddle, Hug — 2012
- Love You More — 2012
- More Blueberries, 2015
- My Love is For You, 2019

=== Compiled or edited by Musgrave ===
- Because You Loved Being a Stranger: 55 Poets Celebrate Patrick Lane — 1994
- Nerves Out Loud: Critical Moments in the Lives of Seven Teen Girls — 2001
- You Be Me: Friendship in the Lives of Teen Girls — 2002
- The Fed Anthology — 2003
- Certain Things About My Mother: Daughters Speak — 2003
- Perfectly Secret: The Hidden Lives of Seven Teen Girls — 2004

=== Song lyrics ===
- "Ode to the missing but not forgotten" — 2006 (performed by the guitarist Brad Prevedoros and singer Amber Smith)
