= Four Days =

Four Days may refer to:

- Four Days (1951 film), a British film directed by John Guillermin
- Four Days (1999 film), a Canadian film directed by Curtis Wehrfritz
- Four Days (album)
- Four Days' Battle 1666
