= Alaskan Tapes =

Canadian musician

Alaskan Tapes is the stage name of Brady Kendall, a Canadian performer of ambient electronic and neoclassical music from Brooklin, Ontario. He has released several albums, as well as composing film scores.

Andrew De Zen's music video for "Places" was a Juno Award nominee for Video of the Year at the Juno Awards of 2019, and Meredith Hama-Brown's music video for "And, We Disappear" was nominated for the Prism Prize in 2020.

== Discography ==
=== Albums ===
- We All Speak in Poems - 2016
- In Distance We're Losing - 2017
- You Were Always an Island - 2018
- The Ocean No Longer Wants Us - 2018
- Millions - 2019
- Views From Sixteen Stories - 2019
- For Us Alone - 2021
- Who Tends a Garden - 2023
- Something Ephemeral - 2024

=== EPs ===
- Familiar Rooms - 2015
- Don't Leave the City - 2015
- In Separation and Isolation - 2015
- Then Suddenly, Everything's Changed - 2015
- Beyond the Streets - 2016
- These Are Our Fears, Part One - 2016
- The Ocean No Longer Wants Us - 2018
- Sleeping Since Last Year - 2020
- On My New Piano - 2023
