= Devil on My Shoulder =

Single by Billy Talent

from the album Billy Talent III
- Released: August 26, 2009
- Genre: Post-hardcore, alternative rock, alternative metal
- Length: 3:48
- Label: Warner Music Canada
- Songwriters: Ian D'Sa; Benjamin Kowalewicz
- Producer: Brendan O'Brien

Billy Talent singles chronology
"Rusted from the Rain" (2009)	"Devil on My Shoulder" (2009)	"Saint Veronika" (2010)

Music video
- "Devil On My Shoulder" on YouTube

"Devil on My Shoulder" is the second official single by Canadian band Billy Talent from their third album, Billy Talent III. It was released as a single on August 26, 2009. It was the second song to be debuted live from the third album before the album's release, after "Turn Your Back".

The B-side to the CD single is a previously unreleased song entitled "Don't Need to Pretend", which was previously available only as a limited bonus track through purchasing Billy Talent III online through the German site Musicload.de.

The song was featured as one of the theme songs for Hell in a Cell (2018) PPV.

== Track listing ==
=== CD single ===
1. "Devil on My Shoulder"- 3:50
2. "Don't Need to Pretend"- 3:45

== Music video ==
The video for the song began shooting during the July 4, 2009 weekend.

The music video for "Devil on My Shoulder" was released August 26, 2009 on MTV. It was directed by Howard Greenhalgh.

The video consists of the band playing at a cabaret bar, with alternate scenes of a man dressed in black (the devil) surrounded by a funnel cloud heading to the bar while causing destruction to a newsstand and a picnic on the way. Towards the end of the video, the man lays a contract on one of the tables. Lead singer Ben Kowalewicz leaves the stage and walks over to the table. The man holds out a pen, which Ben takes and uses to sign the contract (in essence, selling his soul to the devil). Ben then glances up at the camera, revealing that his eyes, normally light brown in colour, have become blood-red. During the final chorus, the funnel cloud is now surrounding Ben as he and the band finish the song while the man watches.

The video was deemed number one on MuchMusic's Holiday Wrap best rock songs of 2009.

== Charts ==
Chart (2009)	Peak position
Canada Hot 100 (Billboard)	46
Canada Rock (Billboard)	2

== Certifications ==
Region	Certification	Certified units/sales
Canada (Music Canada)	2× Platinum	160,000^{‡}
^{‡} Sales+streaming figures based on certification alone.
