= Daniela Andrade =

Canadian singer-songwriter

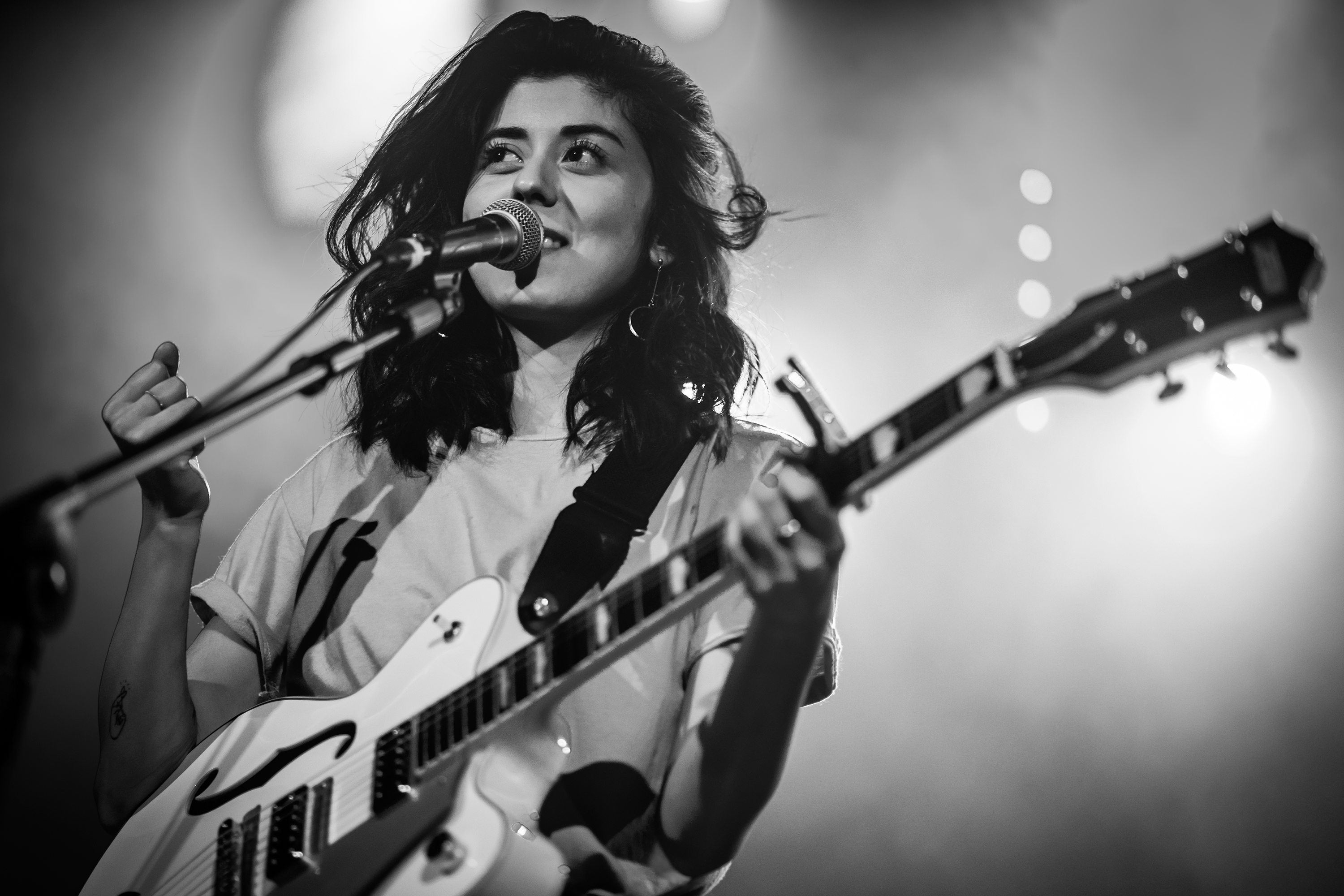

Background information
- Born: August 15, 1992 (age 34); Montreal, Quebec, Canada
- Genres: Alternative rock, Independent music, R&B, Neo Soul
- Years active: 2008 - present
- Labels: Independent, Crooked Lid Records
- Website: danielaandrade.com

Lesly Daniela Andrade Rivera (born 15 August 1992) is a Honduran-Canadian singer and songwriter. She started posting videos on YouTube of her covering songs from Beyonce, Nirvana and Edith Piaf in March 2008. She currently has a total of 1.99 million subscribers and over 300 million views on YouTube. She also posts music on SoundCloud and Spotify.

Andrade gained followers with songs like Coldplay's "The Scientist", and Frank Sinatra's "Fly Me to the Moon" in 2009, she soon increased the frequency of the post, and eventually released an EP of original songs, The Things We've Said, in 2012. She then released a collection Covers, Vol. 1, as well as The Christmas EP. Her low-key version of Gnarls Barkley's "Crazy" went viral in 2014, as did her acoustic cover of Edith Piaf's "La Vie en Rose". Her music has also been featured in commercials and TV shows including Supergirl, Suits, and The Umbrella Academy.

She won the Vista Prize in 2015 and was nominated for the Premios Juventud in 2016 under the category favorite hit-maker. In 2020, she won the Hi-Fidelity Award from the Prism Prize, to honour her innovative music videos.

== Personal life ==
Andrade was born in Montreal, Quebec, Canada, in a financially difficult household as the youngest of four siblings. Her father, Necthaly (Nick) Andrade, was a former choir director and guitarist who immigrated from Honduras to Canada in 1987 and established a construction business in precast supply in 2003 in Edmonton, Alberta, which is where Andrade grew up in her childhood. Andrade's family belonged to a Seventh-day Adventist church, and keeping with the faith's prohibition of dance and music except in praise and service to God, Andrade's mother controlled the music in the family's house, even disapproving of Andrade's father's favourite music in mariachi and balladeers like Jose Luis Perales and Julio Iglesias. Nevertheless, many of Andrade's siblings sang, her father played guitar and so did she at age 13 being taught chords by her father, and she enjoyed singing growing up being inspired by her father. She joined the praise team at her church and she had her first choir solo at age 6. Andrade would listen to bands online in her spare time like Metric and Linkin Park, and she also listened to Latina musicians like Selena, Shakira and Jennifer Lopez, which her parents did not always approve of. These early musical influences led to conflicted visions of her femininity and Latina heritage, where one path "promoted a sense of devotion to the church, to selflessness and to domesticity", while the other path was secular and involved "the dancing, the skin, the topic of being very open about your sexuality, [which] just seemed very far-fetched" to her.

Andrade was first exposed to YouTube while learning from it to improve her guitar playing. She started her YouTube channel in high school in October 2008 with a video covering "Say It's Possible" by YouTuber and musician Terra Naomi, as a way to calm herself before an audition the next day for a singing competition in Calgary, Alberta, which she ultimately did not win; nevertheless she continued to post videos to YouTube of her playing covers around her family home. Andrade gained followers with songs like Coldplay's "The Scientist", and Frank Sinatra's "Fly Me to the Moon", and in 2009, she increased the frequency of her posts and quickly grew in popularity.

In 2011, she graduated from Queen Elizabeth High School in Edmonton, and thereafter, she applied to the University of Alberta to eventually be an English teacher. She abandoned applying to university after she won $10,000 in September 2011 due to overwhelming fan votes in an online competition about musical inspirations with a video of herself & her father covering "Chiquitita" by ABBA, but in Spanish. Andrade used the money to record and release an EP of her own original songs, Things We've Said, in 2012 with producer and YouTuber Jesse Barrera in San Diego, California. She then released a collection Covers, Vol. 1, as well as The Christmas EP. Her low-key cover of Gnarls Barkley's "Crazy" went viral in 2014 and was featured in the second season of the Netflix show Umbrella Academy. Her acoustic cover of Edith Piaf's "La Vie en Rose" also went viral.

She moved to Toronto, Ontario in December 2014, but then moved back to Montréal in the summer of 2015. Andrade intended to produce a music video for her single "Genesis" in Honduras, but due to ongoing civil unrest, she produced the video in one week in Mexico, where emotionally-moving experiences reminded her of her mother and connected her more deeply to her Latin identity.

In January 2026, she released "i see red", the lead single for her March 2026 album Oda.

== Discography ==
=== Albums ===
- Things We've Said (2012)
- Covers, Vol.1 (2013)
- Tamale (2019)
- Oda (2026)

=== EPs and singles ===
- Bright Blue (2011)
- The Christmas EP (2013)
- Latch (2014)
- Crazy In Love (2014)
- La Vie En Rose (2015)
- Shore (2016)
- Nothing Much Has Changed, I Don't Feel The Same (2020)

=== Music videos ===
- Sound (2016)
- Shore (2016)
- Digital Age (2016)
- Come around (2016)
- Gallo Pinto (2019)
- Genesis (2019)
- Sometimes I Don't (2019)
- Polly Pocket (2020)
- Tamale (2020)
- puddles (2020)
- K. L. F. G. (2020)
- Nothing Much Has Changed, I Don't Feel The Same (2020)
