= Erodium Thunk =

2018 Canadian collage animated short

Erodium Thunk is a 2018 Canadian collage animated short by Winston Hacking, who is known for making music videos for such artists as Flying Lotus, Washed Out and Animal Collective.

== Synopsis ==
Named after the 1956 Michael Snow film A to Z, the film is a barrage of hyperlinked TV commercials and magazine ads (with doses of nostalgia and satire) that's also a comedic social commentary on late consumer capitalism.

== Accolades ==
At the 2019 Ottawa International Animation Festival, the film won two awards - one in the Best Technique category for "its intelligent arrangement of source material and fascinating transitions" and the latter in the Non-Narrative Animation category stating that:

"with its compelling balance of control and chance, this ever-morphing collage just kept surprising us".

It also earned the spot on said festival's 50th Anniversary list of favorite Canadian animation shorts.

== See also ==
- Vaporwave
- Criticism of capitalism
- Independent animation
