= Khanvict =

Pakistani-Canadian musician and DJ

Asad Khan, better known as Khanvict, is a Pakistani-Canadian musician, producer, and DJ, based in Surrey, British Columbia. He was nominated for Electronic & Dance Artist of the Year at the 2023 Western Canadian Music Awards and the music video for his song "Closer", directed by Anjali Nayar, was awarded the Audience Award at the 2022 Prism Prize.

== Career ==
Khan was raised in Islamabad, Pakistan until he was 13, when he then moved to Canada. He received an electrical engineering degree from the University of British Columbia and later worked at a developer as a project manager, began his music career as an Indian wedding DJ. He then began expanding into producing and releasing music, eventually signing to the Vancouver-based label Snakes and Ladders.

== Discography ==
=== EPs ===
- Kahani (2019)
- Escape (2021)
- Arrival (2023) (with Raaginder)
