= Harrison (Canadian musician) =

Canadian electronic musician

Harrison Robinson, mononymously known as Harrison, is a Canadian electronic musician from Toronto, Ontario. He is most noted as a two-time Juno Award nominee for Electronic Album of the Year, receiving nods at the Juno Awards of 2017 for Checkpoint Titanium and at the Juno Awards of 2024 for Birds, Bees, the Clouds and the Trees.

Robinson released tracks to SoundCloud before releasing the EP Colors in 2015.

Checkpoint Titanium, his debut full-length album, was released in 2016. He followed up in 2018 with his second album, Apricity.

Birds, Bees, the Clouds and the Trees, his third full-length album, followed in 2023.

In 2026, Harrison released an EP named Quiet Miles including viral tracks "All About Us" and "You Hate Jazz", both of which featured acclaimed saxophonist Jaleel Shaw.

== Awards ==
Maxime Lamontagne's music video for the single "How Can It Be", from the Colors EP, was shortlisted for the Prism Prize in 2016. In 2017, Scott Cudmore's video for "It’s Okay, I Promise" was shortlisted, and in 2019 Ft. Langley's video for "Your Girl" made the shortlist.

"By Myself", a collaboration between Harrison and DijahSB, was a nominee for the 2022 SOCAN Songwriting Prize.
