= Clairmont the Second =

Canadian artist

Clairmont II Humphrey, known professionally as Clairmont The Second, is a Canadian producer/director & rapper from Toronto, Ontario. His 2017 album Lil Mont from the Ave received a Juno Award nomination for Rap Recording of the Year at the Juno Awards of 2018. He also won the 2019 Prism Prize Hi-Fidelity Award and is a finalist for the 2020 Prism Prize (for "Brick").

Beginning his career in 2013, he released the mixtapes Becoming a GentlemIIn, Project II, and A Mixtape by Clairmont The Second before releasing the album Quest for Milk and Honey on Black Box Music in 2016. The album was a longlisted nominee for the 2017 Polaris Music Prize. Lil Mont from the Ave followed in 2017.

His song "Grip" was shortlisted for the 2020 SOCAN Songwriting Prize, and "Dream" was nominated for the same award in 2021.

In addition to his own music, Clairmont appeared as a guest musician on 2017 recordings by Del Bel and Grand Analog, as well as Haviah Mighty's 2019 album 13th Floor.

He is the younger brother of Colanthony Humphrey of the punk rock band The OBGMs.

== Discography ==
- Becoming a GentlemIIn (2013)
- Project II (2014)
- A Mixtape by Clairmont The Second (2015)
- Quest for Milk and Honey (2016)
- Quest For Milk and Honey (Black Edition) (Under Black Box) (2017)
- Lil Mont from The Ave (2017)
- Do You Drive? (2019)
- It's Not How It Sounds (2020)
- they said it would rain (2024)
- Nothing compares (2024)
