= Curtis Wehrfritz =

Curtis Wehrfritz is a Canadian film and music video director and artist. He is most noted as the winner of the Juno Award for Video of the Year at the Juno Awards of 1993, for his video for Leonard Cohen's "Closing Time".

Other artists for whom he has directed videos have included Chalk Circle, The Grapes of Wrath, Tom Cochrane, 54-40, Holly Cole Trio, Blue Rodeo, The Tea Party, The Philosopher Kings, Odds, Barney Bentall and the Legendary Hearts, Mae Moore, Cassandra Vasik and Crowded House.

In 1999 he directed the theatrical feature film Four Days. He subsequently left filmmaking, and pursued work in visual arts, working primarily in daguerreotype and wet plate photography.

== Awards ==
Award	Year	Category	Work	Result	Ref(s)
Genie Awards	1993	Best Art Direction/Production Design	Tectonic Plates	Nominated	
Genie Awards	2000	Claude Jutra Award	Four Days	Nominated	
Juno Awards	1993	Video of the Year	Leonard Cohen, "Closing Time"	Won	
Juno Awards	1993	Video of the Year	Tom Cochrane, "No Regrets"	Nominated	
Juno Awards	1993	Video of the Year	54-40, "She La"	Nominated	
Juno Awards	1994	Video of the Year	Leonard Cohen, "The Future"	Nominated	
Juno Awards	1994	Video of the Year	Holly Cole Trio, "I Can See Clearly Now"	Nominated	
Juno Awards	1995	Video of the Year	Blue Rodeo, "Bad Timing"	Nominated	
Juno Awards	1996	Video of the Year	The Tea Party, "Sister Awake"	Nominated	
Juno Awards	1997	Video of the Year	Odds, "Someone Who's Cool"	Nominated	
MuchMusic Video Awards	1990	VideoFACT Award	Chalk Circle, "Together"	Won	
MuchMusic Video Awards	1991	Best Director	The Grapes of Wrath, "I Am Here"	Won	
MuchMusic Video Awards	1992	Best Director	Tom Cochrane, "No Regrets"	Won	
MuchMusic Video Awards	1992	Best Director	54-40, "She La"	Nominated	
MuchMusic Video Awards	1994	Best Director	Blue Rodeo, "Hasn't Hit Me Yet"	Won	
MuchMusic Video Awards	1995	Best Director	The Philosopher Kings, "Charms"	Nominated	
MuchMusic Video Awards	1996	Best Director	The Tea Party, "Sister Awake"	Won	
