= Sterling Larose =

Sterling Larose is a Canadian director of music videos from Vancouver, British Columbia. He is most noted as the winner of the 2023 Prism Prize, for his video for "Damn Right" by Snotty Nose Rez Kids.

He has also been a three-time Juno Award nominee for Video of the Year, receiving nods at the Juno Awards of 2023 for SonReal's "Remember Me for Me", and dual nods at the Juno Awards of 2024 for both "Damn Right" and young friend's "Feral canadian scaredy cat".
