= Kristof Brandl =

Canadian cinematographer

Kristof Brandl is a Canadian cinematographer and film director from Quebec. He is most noted for his work on the film Falcon Lake, for which he received a Prix Iris nomination for Best Cinematography at the 25th Quebec Cinema Awards in 2023.

== Career ==
Brandl has been a two-time finalist for the Prism Prize, in 2016 as director of Monogrenade's music video for "Le Fantôme" and in 2019 as director of Charlotte Cardin's "The Kids". Although he did not win the competitive award in either year, he was named the winner of the juried Arthur Lipsett Award for innovation in music video in 2016. In 2017, he was an MTV Video Music Award nominee for Best Cinematography for his work on Halsey's video for "Now or Never".

His other credits as a cinematographer or director of music videos have included work for Keith Kouna, Jason Bajada, Majid Jordan, Bastille and Jack White. He has been cinematographer on the short films Wanda, American Dream, Aska, Beast and A Brixton Tale, and director of the short films God Forgives, We Don't and Take Me to a Nice Place.

== Personal life ==
Brandl’s brother, Wilhelm Brandl, also works in film as a composer and sound engineer.
