= Stopwatch Gang =

Group of robbers

The Stopwatch Gang was a group of three Canadians, Paddy Mitchell, Lionel Wright, and Stephen Reid, who made a living robbing banks in the United States and Canada. From 1974 to 1980, they robbed more than 140 banks and stole the equivalent of about 15 million Canadian dollars.

The gang was famous for the meticulous planning of their jobs. They were known for robbing banks in two minutes or less and getting away with no trace. The group was nicknamed "The Stopwatch Gang" by the Federal Bureau of Investigation, because Reid was seen wearing a stopwatch around his neck while robbing the bank. They were known for non-violent methods and politeness to victims.

They successfully completed a $750,000 gold heist in 1974 from the Ottawa airport. They were arrested after that robbery and all escaped from prison by 1979. Then, they carried out a large number of bank robberies in the 1980s along the California coast, where they stole large sums of money. The gang's biggest heist took place at a Bank of America branch in San Diego on September 23, 1980, when the US$283,000 they stole set a San Diego record.

On October 31, 1980, FBI agents arrested Wright and Reid in the Sedona, Arizona area near Slide Rock State Park. Wright and Reid had a hideout in Forest Houses in Oak Creek Canyon and Mitchell rented a house about three miles north. Mitchell was arrested two years later.

The gang's story is recorded in several television documentaries and books, including Mitchell's autobiography, This Bank Robber's Life, which he wrote from prison. Mitchell was diagnosed with lung cancer in 2006, and died on January 14, 2007, in the Federal Medical Center in Butner, N.C. in the prison hospital at the age of 64.

Reid later became a noted Canadian author after writing Jackrabbit Parole while in prison and then being paroled in 1987. In 1999, Reid re-offended and was sentenced to 18 years in prison. He was released on day parole in February 2014. Reid died in the hospital near his home on Haida Gwaii in June 2018.
