= Corridor (band) =

Canadian indie rock band

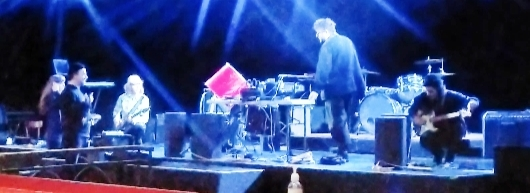

Background information
- Origin: Montreal, Canada
- Genres: Indie rock, psychedelic rock

Corridor is a Canadian indie rock band from Montreal, Quebec, consisting of vocalist and bassist Dominic Berthiaume, guitarist Julian Perreault, guitarist and vocalist Jonathan Robert and drummer Julien Bakvis, with the addition of multi-instrumentalist Samuel Gougoux in live performances. The first francophone band ever signed to the influential indie label Sub Pop, they are most noted for their 2019 album Junior, which was a longlisted nominee for the 2020 Polaris Music Prize.

The band released their debut EP Un magicien en toi in 2013, and followed up with their full-length debut Le Voyage Éternel in 2015. Their second album Supermercado followed in 2017.

They signed to Bonsound in Canada and Sub Pop internationally in 2019, and released Junior on October 18 that year. The album was supported by an international tour with dates in Canada, the United States and Europe.

The album's lead single "Topographe" was shortlisted for the 2020 SOCAN Songwriting Prize. It featured a video animated by Jonathan Robert, which was a shortlisted Juno Award nominee for Video of the Year at the Juno Awards of 2020. Their video for "Grand cheval", released in March 2020, was animated by Chad VanGaalen.

On January 23, corridor announced their fourth album, Mimi, which was released on April 26, 2024. The album was a longlisted nominee for the 2024 Polaris Music Prize.

Robert has also released solo material under the stage name Jonathan Personne.

== Discography ==
=== Studio albums ===
- Le Voyage Èternal (2015)
- Supermercado (2017)
- Junior (2019)
- Mimi (2024)

=== Extended plays ===
- Un Magicien En Toi (2013)

=== Singles ===
- "Le Viol De Sharone" (2016)
- "Et Hop" (2021)
