= Billy Talent III =

Studio album by Billy Talent
- Released: July 10, 2009
- Recorded: November 2008 – April 2009
- Studios: Henson Recording Studios (Los Angeles, California); Southern Tracks (Atlanta, Georgia)
- Genres: Alternative rock; pop-punk; post-hardcore
- Length: 43:30 (Standard); 1:41:48 (Guitar Villain)
- Labels: Warner; Roadrunner
- Producer: Brendan O'Brien

Billy Talent chronology
666 (2007)	Billy Talent III (2009)	Dead Silence (2012)

Singles from Billy Talent III
- 1. "Turn Your Back" Released: September 16, 2008; 2. "Rusted from the Rain" Released: May 19, 2009; 3. "Devil on My Shoulder" Released: August 26, 2009; 4. "Saint Veronika" Released: February 1, 2010; 5. "Diamond on a Landmine" Released: June 21, 2010

Professional ratings
Aggregate scores
Source	Rating
Metacritic	45/100
Review scores
Source	Rating
AllMusic	3/5 stars
Chart	3/5 stars
Drowned in Sound	2/10
The Fly	3/5 stars
NME	5/10
Now	3/5 stars
Q	2/5 stars
Rock Sound	9/10
Sputnikmusic	2.0/5
Uncut	2/5 stars

Billy Talent III is the third studio album by Canadian rock band Billy Talent. It was released on July 10, 2009, in Europe, July 13 in the United Kingdom, July 14 in Canada, and September 22 in the US. The album debuted at No. 1 on the Canadian Albums Chart, selling over 40,000 copies in its first week. It also peaked at No. 107 on the Billboard 200, making it Billy Talent's highest-charting album to date. In April 2010, the album won a Juno Award for best rock album of the year. Despite the commercial success, Billy Talent III received mixed to negative reviews. On Metacritic, the album earned a score of 45/100, which means "mixed or average reviews" based on 7 critics; one review being negative and the other six being mixed.

== Background ==
A demo version of one of the album's songs, "Turn Your Back", was released as a single in September 2008 and featured the band members of Anti-Flag. The first legitimate single from Billy Talent III is "Rusted from the Rain", which premiered May 17, 2009 on Triple J. The album version of "Turn Your Back" does not include Anti-Flag's vocals, as the single version does.

The second single from the album, "Devil on My Shoulder" was released on August 26, 2009.

A promotional website located at billytalent3.com was launched to showcase the making of the album. Part of the promotion also included the Billy Talent Widget which allowed listeners to become the "Ultimate Billy Talent Fan". The widget rewarded users with rare tracks, videos, pictures and interviews as fans "level up" their widgets.

On June 8, 2009, the band announced the release of a special deluxe edition of the album, entitled Billy Talent III: Guitar Villain Edition. The special edition featured a second disc of the album, without the inclusion of guitar (referred to as "Guitar Villain Tracks"), plus guitar tabs of the entire album transcribed on two full-size posters, for fans to play along to. Along with this guitar-less version, the disc is concluded with four additional demos.

The band embarked on a supporting tour on February 21, 2009, starting with an Australian first leg.

== Track listing ==
All tracks are written by Billy Talent.

Standard edition
No.	Title	Length
1.	"Devil on My Shoulder"	3:49
2.	"Rusted from the Rain"	4:13
3.	"Saint Veronika"	4:09
4.	"Tears into Wine"	4:12
5.	"White Sparrows"	3:14
6.	"Pocketful of Dreams"	3:21
7.	"The Dead Can't Testify"	4:27
8.	"Diamond on a Landmine"	4:30
9.	"Turn Your Back"	3:22
10.	"Sudden Movements"	3:39
11.	"Definition of Destiny"	4:03
Total length:		43:30

Limited "Guitar Villain" deluxe edition CD
No.	Title	Length
1.	"Devil on My Shoulder" (Guitar Villain)	3:49
2.	"Rusted from the Rain" (Guitar Villain)	4:13
3.	"Saint Veronika" (Guitar Villain)	4:09
4.	"Tears into Wine" (Guitar Villain)	4:12
5.	"White Sparrows" (Guitar Villain)	3:14
6.	"Pocketful of Dreams" (Guitar Villain)	3:21
7.	"The Dead Can't Testify" (Guitar Villain)	4:27
8.	"Diamond on a Landmine" (Guitar Villain)	4:30
9.	"Turn Your Back" (Guitar Villain)	3:22
10.	"Sudden Movements" (Guitar Villain)	3:39
11.	"Definition of Destiny" (Guitar Villain)	4:03
12.	"Tears into Wine" (Demo Version)	3:51
13.	"White Sparrows" (Demo Version)	3:58
14.	"Pocketful of Dreams" (Demo Version)	3:42
15.	"Turn Your Back" (Demo Version)	3:22
Total length:		1:41:48

US digital special edition
No.	Title	Length
12.	"Bloody Nails + Broken Hearts"	3:37
13.	"Don't Need to Pretend"	3:45
14.	"Devil on My Shoulder" (Demo Version)	4:06
Total length:		54:18

UK iTunes bonus tracks
No.	Title	Length
12.	"Bloody Nails + Broken Hearts"	3:37
13.	"Devil on My Shoulder" (Demo Version)	4:06
Total length:		51:03

Musicload.de German exclusive
No.	Title	Length
12.	"Don't Need to Pretend"	3:45
Total length:		47:15

EU edition bonus tracks
No.	Title	Length
12.	"Tears into Wine" (Demo Version)	3:51
13.	"White Sparrows" (Demo Version)	3:58
14.	"Turn Your Back" (Demo Version)	3:22
Total length:		54:02

== Personnel ==
Personnel taken from Billy Talent III liner notes.

Billy Talent

- Benjamin Kowalewicz – lead vocals
- Ian D'Sa – guitar, backing vocals
- Jonathan Gallant – bass, backing vocals
- Aaron Solowoniuk – drums

Additional musician

- Brendan O'Brien – Mellotron, piano, hammerchord, percussion, other additional instruments

Technical personnel

- Brendan O'Brien – producer, mixing
- Nick DiDia – recording
- Billy Bowers – additional engineering
- Tom Syrowski – recording assistance (Henson Recording)
- Martin Cooke – recording assistance (Henson Recording)
- Tom Tapley – engineering (Southern Tracks)
- Kory Aaron – engineering assistance (Southern Tracks)
- Steve Morrison – engineering assistance (Southern Tracks)
- Tom "TK" Kidd – additional engineering (Southern Tracks)
- Kenny Luong – engineering (The Orange Lounge)
- Jason "Metal" Donkersgoed – engineering assistance (The Orange Lounge)
- Bob Ludwig – mastering
- Dustin Rabin – photography
- Doublenaut – artwork, package design

== Charts and certifications ==
=== Weekly charts ===
Weekly chart performance for Billy Talent III
Chart (2009)	Peak position
Australian Albums (ARIA)	44
Austrian Albums (Ö3 Austria)	2
Canadian Albums (Billboard)	1
European Top 100 Albums (Billboard)	6
Finnish Albums (Suomen virallinen lista)	3
German Albums (Offizielle Top 100)	2
Irish Albums (IRMA)	98
Norwegian Albums (VG-lista)	28
Scottish Albums (Official Charts)	54
Swiss Albums (Schweizer Hitparade)	3
UK Albums (Official Charts)	35
UK Album Downloads (Official Charts)	17
UK Rock & Metal Albums (Official Charts)	1
US Billboard 200	107
US Top Rock Albums (Billboard)	43

=== Year-end charts ===
Year-end chart performance for Billy Talent III
Chart (2009)	Position
Austrian Albums (Ö3 Austria)	36
Canadian Albums (Billboard)	23
German Albums (Offizielle Top 100)	32
Swiss Albums (Schweizer Hitparade)	93

=== Certifications ===
Certifications for Billy Talent III
Region	Certification	Certified units/sales
Canada (Music Canada)	3× Platinum	240,000^{‡}
Germany (BVMI)	2× Platinum	400,000^{^}
^{^} Shipments figures based on certification alone.^{‡} Sales+streaming figures based on certification alone.

== Release history ==
Date	Region
July 10, 2009	Belgium, Germany, Switzerland, Austria, Italy and the Netherlands
July 13, 2009	France, Norway, Denmark, South Africa, UK and Ireland
July 14, 2009	Canada, Finland, Spain and Sweden
July 17, 2009	Australia and New Zealand
September 22, 2009	US
November 11, 2009	Japan
