= Turn Your Back =

Single by Billy Talent featuring Anti-Flag

from the album Billy Talent III
- Released: September 15, 2008
- Genre: Punk rock
- Length: 3:24
- Label: Warner Music Canada
- Songwriter: Billy Talent

Billy Talent singles chronology
"This Suffering" (2007)	"Turn Your Back" (2008)	"Rusted from the Rain" (2009)

"Turn Your Back" is the first demo single by Billy Talent from their third studio album, Billy Talent III. The song debuted live at The Norwegian Wood Festival in Oslo, Norway, on June 14, 2008 during their performance. Later performances of the song would be accompanied by Justin Sane and Chris #2 of Anti-Flag, who also appear as guest vocalists on the single. Lead singer Ben Kowalewicz told Kerrang!: "This is about being accountable for your actions - socially, politically and environmentally."

On August 27, 2008, the band posted a promotional poster for the single on their MySpace website.

Although not a promotional single for the third album (released almost a year before the album), the single was released as a charity stand-alone single on iTunes. The album version of it, however, does not feature the guest vocals of Anti-Flag's Justin Sane and Chris #2.

On September 2, 2008, on the Radio 1 Punk Show the song was played for the first time. The song came out on iTunes on September 15, 2008. The single was officially released in Europe on September 12, 2008, and was also released in Canada, the United States and France on September 16, 2008, and Australia on September 20, 2008. On the week of September 27, it debuted at number 23 on the Canadian Hot 100 chart on downloads alone.

The song was featured on the soundtrack of the NHL 09 video game.

== Release history ==
Country	Date
United Kingdom	September 15, 2008
United States	September 16, 2008
Australia	September 20, 2008

== Chart performance ==
Chart (2008)	Peak position
Canadian Hot 100	23

== Certifications ==
Certifications for "Turn Your Back"
Region	Certification	Certified units/sales
Canada (Music Canada)	Gold	40,000^{‡}
^{‡} Sales+streaming figures based on certification alone.
