= Keavan Yazdani =

Visual artist based in Toronto, Canada

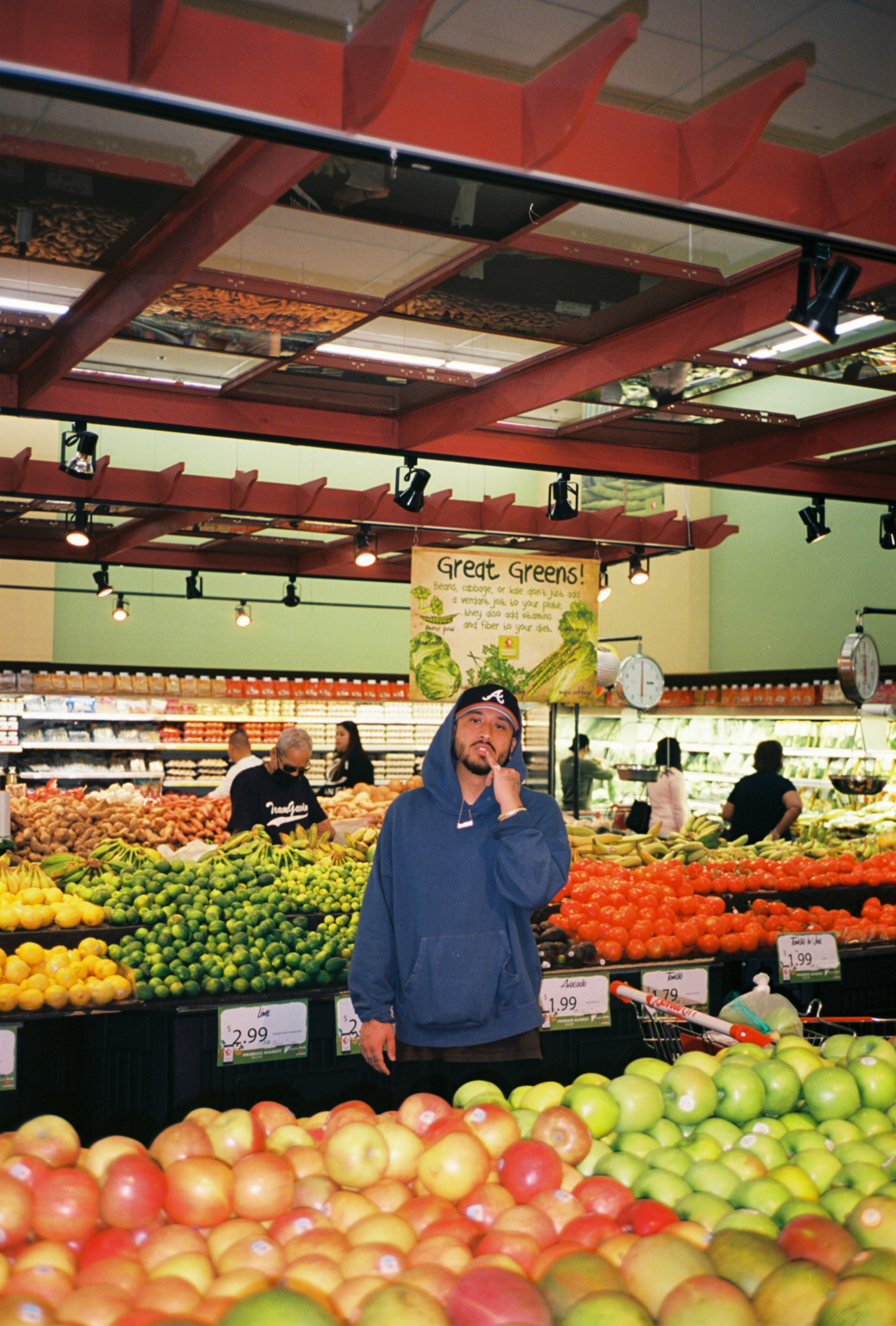
- Born: May 18, 1993 (age 31); Toronto, Ontario, Canada
- Occupation(s): Visual artist, songwriter

Keavan Yazdani is a Grammy-nominated Canadian songwriter and multidisciplinary visual artist.

== Career ==
Yazdani was born in Toronto, Ontario. He was born to a Persian father, and a Filipino mother. He has worked with artists such as Daniel Caesar, Justin Bieber, Koffee, River Tiber, H.E.R., Brandy Norwood and Sean Leon. He is the founder of, Joaquina, a creative outlet for his design.

== Videography ==
=== Music videos ===
As director:

- Daniel Caesar: Coachella Barcelona Circuit (2020)
- Daniel Caesar Feat. Koffee: Cyanide (Remix) (2019)
- Daniel Caesar: Freudian (2017)
- Daniel Caesar: We Find Love/Blessed (2017)
- Daniel Caesar and H.E.R.: Best Part (2017)
- River Tiber (Feat. Daniel Caesar) : West (2016)

=== Documentary ===
As director:

- Making It In Canada: Keavan Yazdani (2022)
- Love Again: The Conversation (2019)

== Awards and nominations ==
Year	Result	Award	Category	Work	Ref.
2022	Won	ASCAP Pop Music Awards	Most Performed Songs	Peaches	
2022	Nominated	Grammy Awards	Song of the Year	Peaches	
2022	Nominated	Grammy Awards	Album of the Year	Justice	
2020	Nominated	Juno Award	Album Artwork of the Year	Case Study 01	
2020	Won	Prism Prize	Audience Award	Cyanide (Remix)	
2019	Nominated	Prism Prize	Prism Prize	Best Part	
2018	Won	Prism Prize	Audience Award	Freudian	
2018	Nominated	Juno Award	Album Artwork of the year	Freudian	
