= Peter Huang (director) =

Chinese-Canadian director, writer, and producer

Peter Huang (born 3 July 1985) is a Chinese-Canadian director, writer, producer, and co-executive producer known for his work in music videos, commercials, and television. Based in Toronto and Los Angeles, he is recognized for visually compelling narratives and strong performances.

== Early life and education ==
Peter Huang was born on 3 July 1985 in Jiamusi, Heilongjiang, China. He moved to Canada and studied film at Sheridan College.

== Career ==
Huang began his career as a writer-producer at Collective Pictures, co-producing the Netflix feature Code 8. He later transitioned to directing, focusing on music videos and commercials for major international artists.

Huang has directed videos for Eminem, Avicii, Martin Garrix, Jessie Reyez, SonReal, and others. For Avicii and Nicky Romero's "I Could Be the One," Huang won First Prize at the Young Director Award at Cannes. He has also directed branded campaigns for Google and Walmart.

His short film 5 Films About Technology was acquired by NEON and screened theatrically in front of the film Colossal starring Anne Hathaway. The film was also featured at the Sundance Film Festival and later adapted into the anthology Nine Films About Technology for FX's Cake, where he served as showrunner and writer. Huang has also directed episodes of CBC/Netflix's Workin’ Moms and CTV/Roku's Children Ruin Everything.

In 2024, he served as director and co-executive producer on Late Bloomer, a Crave series nominated for Best Direction in a Comedy at the 2025 Canadian Screen Awards.

== Music videos and recognition ==
Huang has directed numerous award-winning music videos. He won the 2020 Prism Prize for Jessie Reyez's "Far Away" and was previously shortlisted in 2017 and 2019. He was nominated at the 2018 Juno Awards and the 2018 MTV Video Music Awards for Jessie Reyez's "Gatekeeper". He received multiple nominations at the 2017 iHeartRadio Much Music Video Awards.

== Awards and nominations ==
- 2020 Prism Prize, Winner, "Far Away" – Jessie Reyez
- 2018 Juno Award nominee, "Gatekeeper" – Jessie Reyez
- 2018 MTV Video Music Awards nominee, "Gatekeeper" – Jessie Reyez
- Young Director Award First Prize, Cannes, for "I Could Be the One" – Avicii
