= Four Days (1999 film) =

- Directed by: Curtis Wehrfritz
- Written by: Pinckney Benedict
- Based on: Four Days by John Buell
- Produced by: Greg Dummett; Lorraine Richard
- Starring: Kevin Zegers; Colm Meaney; Lolita Davidovich
- Cinematography: Mirosław Baszak
- Edited by: Gaétan Huot
- Music by: Tom Third
- Production companies: Greg Dummett Films; Cité-Amérique
- Distributed by: Behaviour Distribution
- Release date: September 12, 1999 (TIFF)
- Running time: 92 minutes
- Country: Canada
- Language: English

Four Days is a Canadian crime drama film, directed by Curtis Wehrfritz and released in 1999. The film stars Kevin Zegers as Simon, a teenage skateboarder who has been drawn into a bank robbery by his father Milt (William Forsythe). Milt and Simon have arranged to double-cross Milt's partner Fury (Colm Meaney) by having Simon take the money to a secluded cabin, which he does by hitching a ride from Crystal (Lolita Davidovich), a woman on the run from an abusive ex-husband; however, after Milt is shot and killed at the bank, his girlfriend Feather (Anne-Marie Cadieux) tips Fury off to Simon's whereabouts, and Fury begins to pursue them to recover the money.

The supporting cast includes Patrick Goyette, John Dunn-Hill, Armand Laroche, Géraldine Doucet, Johnny Morina, Mario Janelle, Amanda Davis, Andrea Sheldon, Josée Larivière, Philip Pretten, Danielle Desormeaux and Pierre Lenoir, as well as Stephen Reid, himself a former bank robber, in a small role as a security guard at the bank.

== Production and distribution ==
Written by Pinckney Benedict based on a novel by John Buell, the film was Wehrfritz's narrative directorial debut after working primarily in music video and advertising. It was shot in Quebec in fall 1998.

It premiered at the 1999 Toronto International Film Festival.

== Critical response ==
Dan Brown of the National Post positively reviewed the film, writing that "there's a botched bank heist, a bag of money for a MacGuffin, a betrayal, a stacked redhead running from a dangerous husband, even a torture scene. And the script -- written by Pinckney Benedict and based on the novel by Montreal writer John Buell -- crackles like the best of them. At one point in Four Days, one character complains that she's tired and lost. "Welcome to the human condition," comes back the world-weary response. To these stock elements Wehrfritz has added his own touches. For starters, he's made the protagonist of the piece a shy 14-year-old boy (Kevin Zegers). He's also globalized the cast (which includes Ontarian Lolita Davidovich, Quebecers Anne-Marie Cadieux and Patrick Goyette, American William Forsythe and Irishman Colm Meaney) and pulled the genre away from its urban roots. Nowhere is it written that the Quebec countryside in autumn is the ideal setting for a film noir, but Wehrfritz makes it work splendidly (it may work so well because the landscape, at that time of year, seems to be both bursting with life and in its death throes at the same time)."

Liam Lacey of The Globe and Mail was more negative, writing that "all this has a strained jocularity (there's a visit to a roadside attraction called Santa's Hole), puzzling dialogue ("as clean as a weasel," says Fury), culminating in even less credible fatalism. The script isn't exactly standard B-material, but the overliterate simulacrum of tough-guy talk consistently rings false, and the cast of absurd characters (Crystal? Feather? Fury?) are little more than clumsy constructs."

== Awards ==
Bobby O'Malley, Dominique Delguste and Réjean Juteau received a Jutra Award nomination for Best Sound at the 2nd Jutra Awards in 2000.
