= Rusted from the Rain =

Single by Billy Talent

from the album Billy Talent III
- B-side: "Cold Turkey"
- Released: May 19, 2009 (Radio airplay); June 30, 2009 (CD single); July 28, 2009 (US digital EP)
- Genre: Alternative rock, post-hardcore, emo
- Length: 4:13
- Label: Warner Music Canada
- Songwriters: Ian D'Sa; Benjamin Kowalewicz
- Producer: Brendan O'Brien

Billy Talent singles chronology
"Turn Your Back" (2008)	"Rusted from the Rain" (2009)	"Devil on My Shoulder" (2009)

Music video
- "Rusted From The Rain" on YouTube

"Rusted from the Rain" is the first official single by Canadian rock band Billy Talent off their album Billy Talent III. It was released on May 19, 2009. Lead singer Ben Kowalewicz has said that the song is very "tin man-esque" and evolved from an "epic Soundgarden-like riff". The lyrics are about marital breakdown, Kowalewicz told Kerrang!: "Nowadays, I'm seeing a lot of people who got married young are now getting divorced. It seems to be a new fad. Divorce is the new black." The song was nominated for Single of the Year at the 2010 Juno Awards, but lost to Michael Bublé's "Haven't Met You Yet".

The band's cover of John Lennon's classic song "Cold Turkey", was released on the CD single, on June 30, 2009.

== Track listing ==
=== CD single ===
1. "Rusted from the Rain" – 4:14
2. "Cold Turkey" (John Lennon cover) – 3:08

=== Maxi CD ===
1. "Rusted from the Rain" – 4:14
2. "Cold Turkey" (John Lennon cover) – 3:08
3. "Red Flag" (live at the Horseshoe Tavern) – 3:50
4. "Rusted from the Rain" (music video) – 4:14

=== US digital EP ===
1. "Rusted from the Rain" – 4:13
2. "Devil on My Shoulder" – 3:48
3. "Cold Turkey" (John Lennon cover) – 3:08
4. "Red Flag" (live at the Horseshoe Tavern) – 3:16

== Music video ==
The video was shot in April 2009 by director Wayne Isham in Los Angeles. The video pans between the band playing in a junkyard and a vagrant collecting junk and garbage in the streets. As the video progresses, it is revealed that the man collected the trash to construct a makeshift carousel for a small group of children in the neighbourhood.

== Charts ==
Chart (2009)	Peak position
Austria (Ö3 Austria Top 40)	19
Canada Hot 100 (Billboard)	9
Canada CHR/Top 40 (Billboard)	45
Canada Rock (Billboard)	1
European Hot 100 Singles (Billboard)	53
Germany (GfK)	14
Switzerland (Schweizer Hitparade)	53

=== Year-end charts ===
Chart (2009)	Position
Canadian Hot 100	61

== Certifications ==
Region	Certification	Certified units/sales
Austria (IFPI Austria)	Gold	15,000^{*}
Canada (Music Canada)	5× Platinum	400,000^{‡}
Germany (BVMI)	Gold	300,000^{‡}
New Zealand (RMNZ)	Gold	15,000^{‡}
^{*} Sales figures based on certification alone.^{‡} Sales+streaming figures based on certification alone.
