= Prism Prize =

Canadian Modern Music Award

The Prism Prize is a national juried award recognizing the artistry of the modern music video in Canada. A jury of over 120 Canadian music and film industry professionals, including members of the print and web media, broadcasting, film, radio, and video art communities, nominate the 10 best videos of the year to comprise the Prism Prize shortlist. The winning video receives a cash prize of $20,000. This is the richest cash prize for music videos in North America.

Founded by Louis Calabro in 2012, the award is administered by the Academy of Canadian Cinema and Television.

The inaugural Prism Prize was awarded in March 2013 to director Noah Pink for Rich Aucoin’s "Brian Wilson Is A.L.I.V.E", while director Vincent Morisset took home the Audience Award for Arcade Fire’s "Sprawl II".

For the second award presentation in 2014, the Prism Prize introduced two new awards, the Special Achievement Award for artistic achievements and exceptional contribution to music video art on a world stage, and the Arthur Lipsett Award for innovative and unique approaches to music video art.

The 2014 Prism Prize was presented on March 23, 2014 to director Emily Kai Bock for her Arcade Fire "Afterlife" video. The Audience Award went to director Kheaven Lewandowski for his video for "River" by The Belle Game. The Arthur Lipsett Award was presented to Scott Cudmore and Michael LeBlanc for their innovative video work. The Special Achievement Award went to Floria Sigismondi.

In 2020 the committee introduced the Willie Dunn Award, a lifetime achievement award honouring Canadians who have been trailblazers in the art of music video. The award was named in memory of Willie Dunn, an indigenous Canadian musician whose 1968 animated short film The Ballad of Crowfoot has sometimes been credited as the first Canadian music video.

The award was placed on hiatus in 2025, with the organizers announcing that they wanted to "consider the future contributions of the Prism Prize to the cultural landscape and to explore new approaches to best support and celebrate the artists we aim to serve."

== Winners and nominees ==
=== 2013 ===
Nominees were announced on February 14, 2013, and the winners were announced on March 24.

- Prism Prize: Rich Aucoin, "Brian Wilson Is A.L.I.V.E." (director Noah Pink)
- Audience Award: Arcade Fire - "Sprawl II (Mountains Beyond Mountains)" (director Vincent Morisset)
- Drake - "HYFR (Hell Ya Fucking Right)" (director Director X)
- Grimes - "Genesis" (director Claire Boucher)
- Grimes - "Oblivion" (director Emily Kai Bock)
- METZ - "Wet Blanket" (director Scott Cudmore)
- Mother Mother - "The Sticks" (director Chad VanGaalen)
- Maylee Todd - "Baby's Got It" (director Reynard Li)
- Yamantaka // Sonic Titan - "Hoshi Neko" (directors Emily Pelstring and Ruby Kato Attwood)
- Young Rival - "Two Reasons" (director John Smith)

=== 2014 ===
Nominees were announced on February 18, 2014, and the winners were announced on March 23.

- Prism Prize: Arcade Fire - "Afterlife" (director Emily Kai Bock)
- Audience Award: The Belle Game – "River" (director Kheaven Lewandowski)
- Arcade Fire – "Reflektor" (director Anton Corbijn)
- Drake – "Started from the Bottom" (director Director X)
- Hollerado – "So It Goes" (director Marc Ricciardelli)
- Keys N Krates – "Dum Dee Dum" (director Amos LeBlanc)
- Jessy Lanza – "Kathy Lee" (director Lee Skinner)
- Majical Cloudz – "Childhood’s End" (director Emily Kai Bock)
- Shad – "Fam Jam (Fe Sum Immigrins)" (director Che Kothari)
- Young Galaxy – "New Summer" (director Ivan Grbovic)

=== 2015 ===
Nominees were announced on February 12, 2015, and the winners were announced on March 29.

- Prism Prize: Timber Timbre, "Beat the Drum Slowly" (director Chad VanGaalen)
- Audience Award: Kandle, "Not Up to Me" (director Natalie Rae Robison)
- The New Pornographers, "Dancehall Domine" (directors Scott Cudmore and Michael LeBlanc)
- PUP, "Guilt Trip" (directors Chandler Levack and Jeremy Schaulin-Rioux)
- Fur Trade, "Same Temptation" (director Kheaven Lewandowski)
- Rich Aucoin, "Yelling in Sleep" (director Joel Mackenzie)
- Ryan Hemsworth, "Snow in Newark" (director Martin C. Pariseau)
- Kevin Drew, "You in Your Were" (director Samir Rehem)
- Odonis Odonis, "Order in the Court" (director Lee Stringle)
- Chad VanGaalen, "Monster" (director Chad VanGaalen)

=== 2016 ===
Beginning in 2016, the prize revised its process. A longlist of 20 nominees was announced on February 9, 2016, a shortlist of 10 finalists was announced on March 22, and the winner was named on May 15.

==== Shortlist ====
- Prism Prize: Kalle Mattson, "Avalanche" (director Philip Sportel)
- Audience Award: Death From Above 1979, "Virgins" (director Eva Michon)
- Arthur Lipsett Award: Kristof Brandl
- A Tribe Called Red, "Suplex" (director Jon Riera)
- Braids, "Miniskirt" (director Kevan Funk)
- Drake, "Hotline Bling" (director Director X)
- The Elwins, "So Down Low" (director Alan Poon)
- The Fast Romantics, "Julia" (director Matthew Angus)
- Grimes, "Flesh Without Blood" (director Grimes)
- Harrison, "How Can It Be" (director Maxime Lamontagne)
- Monogrenade, "Le Fantôme" (director Kristof Brandl)

==== Longlist ====
- A Tribe Called Red, "Suplex" (director Jon Riera)
- Absolutely Free, "Vision's" (directors Scott Cudmore and Michael LeBlanc)
- Aidan Knight, "All Clear" (director Ft. Langley)
- Alessia Cara, "Here" (director Aaron A)
- Braids, "Miniskirt" (director Kevan Funk)
- Daniel Romano, "I'm Gonna Teach You" (director Chad VanGaalen)
- Death From Above 1979, "Virgins" (director Eva Michon)
- Drake, "Hotline Bling" (director Director X)
- The Elwins, "So Down Low" (director Alan Poon)
- The Fast Romantics, "Julia" (director Matthew Angus)
- Grimes, "Flesh Without Blood" (director Grimes)
- Harrison, "How Can It Be" (director Maxime Lamontagne)
- Kalle Mattson, "Avalanche" (director Philip Sportel)
- Monogrenade, "Le Fantôme" (director Kristof Brandl)
- Peaches, "Rub" (directors Peaches, A.L. Steiner and Lex Vaughn)
- PUP, "Dark Days" (directors Jeremy Schaulin-Rioux and Chandler Levack)
- Shy Kids, "Rockets" (director Walter Woodman)
- SonReal, "For the Town" (director Peter Huang)
- Spek Won feat. Shi Wisdom, "Black Body" (director Mark Valino)
- Yukon Blonde, "Saturday Night" (directors Mac Boucher and Gaya Abdalian)

=== 2017 ===
==== Winners ====
- Prism Prize: Kaytranada, "Lite Spots" (director Martin C. Pariseau)
- Audience Award: Andy Shauf, "The Magician" (director Winston Hacking)
- Lipsett Prize: Kid
- Hi-Fidelity Award: July Talk
- Special Achievement: Revolver Films

==== Shortlist ====
- A Tribe Called Red feat. Black Bear, "Stadium Pow Wow" (director Kevan Funk)
- BadBadNotGood feat. Kaytranada, "Lavender" (director Fantavious Fritz)
- Grimes, "Kill v. Maim" (directors Claire Boucher and Mac Boucher)
- Harrison feat. Clairmont the Second, "It’s Okay, I Promise" (director Scott Cudmore)
- July Talk, "Picturing Love" (director Jared Raab)
- Kaytranada, "Lite Spots" (director Martin C. Pariseau)
- PUP, "DVP" (director Jeremy Schaulin-Rioux)
- PUP, "Sleep in the Heat" (director Jeremy Schaulin-Rioux)
- Andy Shauf, "The Magician" (director Winston Hacking)
- Wintersleep, "Amerika" (director Scott Cudmore)

==== Longlist ====
- BadBadNotGood feat. Kaytranada, "Lavender" (director Fantavious Fritz)
- Braids, "Companion" (director Kevan Funk)
- Jazz Cartier, "Red Alert / 100 Roses" (director Jon Riera)
- Dilly Dally, "Snakehead" (director Scott Cudmore)
- Grimes, "Kill v. Maim" (directors Claire Boucher and Mac Boucher)
- Harrison feat. Clairmont the Second, "It’s Okay, I Promise" (director Scott Cudmore)
- Holy Fuck, "Tom Tom" (director Michael Leblanc)
- July Talk, "Picturing Love" (director Jared Raab)
- Kaytranada, "Lite Spots" (director Martin C. Pariseau)
- Aidan Knight, "What Light (Never Goes Dim)" (director FT Langley)
- Lisa LeBlanc, "Gold Diggin’ Hoedown" (director Didier Charette)
- PUP, "DVP" (director Jeremy Schaulin-Rioux)
- PUP, "Sleep in the Heat" (director Jeremy Schaulin-Rioux)
- Ronley Teper's Lipliners, "Lucky and Finnegan" (director Davide Di Saro)
- Somewhere Else feat. Majid Jordan, "Move Together" (director Helmi)
- SonReal, "Can I Get a Witness" (director Peter Huang)
- Andy Shauf, "The Magician" (director Winston Hacking)
- Tanya Tagaq, "Retribution" (director Brian Johnson)
- A Tribe Called Red feat. Black Bear, "Stadium Pow Wow" (director Kevan Funk)
- Wintersleep, "Amerika" (director Scott Cudmore)

=== 2018 ===
==== Winners ====
- Prism Prize: Charlotte Day Wilson, "Work" (director Fantavious Fritz)
- Audience Award: Daniel Caesar, "Freudian, A Visual" (directors Keavan Yazdani and Sean Brown)
- Hi-Fidelity Award: Grimes
- Lipsett Award: Karena Evans, making her the first woman to win the award
- Special Achievement Award: Cherie Sinclair

==== Shortlist ====
- Alvvays, "Dreams Tonight" (director Matt Johnson)
- Daniel Caesar, "Freudian, A Visual" (directors Keavan Yazdani and Sean Brown)
- Leonard Cohen, "Leaving the Table" (director Christopher Mills)
- CRi ft. Ouri, "Rush" (director Didier Charette)
- Feist, "Century" (director Scott Cudmore)
- Alice Glass, "Without Love" (director Floria Sigismondi)
- Grimes ft. Janelle Monae, "Venus Fly" (director Claire Boucher)
- PUP, "Old Wounds" (director Jeremy Schaulin-Rioux)
- Jessie Reyez, "Gatekeeper" (director Peter Huang)
- Charlotte Day Wilson, "Work" (director Fantavious Fritz)

==== Longlist ====
- A Tribe Called Red feat. Black Bear, "Indian City" (director Combo Bravo)
- Alice Glass, "Without Love" (director Floria Sigismondi)
- Alvvays, "Dream Tonight "(director Matt Johnson)
- The Belle Game, "Spirit" (director Kheaven Lewandowski)
- Beyries, "Son" (director Philippe Grenier)
- Charlotte Day Wilson, "Work" (director Fantavious Fritz)
- Clairmont the Second, "The Ave in You" (director Clairmont the Second)
- CRi ft. Ouri, "Rush" (director Didier Charette)
- Daniel Caesar, "Freudian, a Visual" (director Keaven Yazdani and Sean Brown)
- Feist, "Century" (director Scott Cudmore)
- Flying Hórses, "Tölt" (director Alexandre Richard)
- Grimes feat. Janelle Monae, "Venus Fly" (director Grimes)
- Harrison, "Right Hook" (director Eva Michon)
- Homeshake, "Every Single Thing" (director Wen hao Chang)
- Husser, "Can't Blame Em" (director Emilie Lavoie)
- Jessie Reyez, "Gatekeeper" (director Peter Huang)
- Leonard Cohen, "Leaving the Table" (director Christopher Mills)
- PUP, "Old Wounds" (director Jeremy Schaulin-Rioux)
- The Weeknd, "Secrets" (director Pedro Martin-Carelo)
- Young Rival, "Elevator" (director John Smith)

=== 2019 ===
==== Winners ====
- Prism Prize: The Belle Game, "Low" (director Kevan Funk)
- Audience Award: Said the Whale, "UnAmerican" (director Johnny Jansen)
- Hi-Fidelity Award: Clairmont the Second, "Gheeze" (director Clairmont the Second)
- Lipsett Award: Soleil Denault
- Special Achievement Award: Lacey Duke

==== Shortlist ====
- The Belle Game, "Low" (director Kevan Funk)
- Blue Hawaii, "Do You Need Me" (director Kevan Funk)
- Cadence Weapon, "High Rise" (director Lester Millado)
- Charlotte Cardin, "The Kids" (director Kristof Brandl)
- Clairmont the Second, "Gheeze" (director Clairmont the Second)
- Classified, "Powerless" (director Andy Hines)
- Daniel Caesar feat. H.E.R., "Best Part, a Visual" (directors Keavan Yazdani and Sean Brown)
- Harrison ft. Ralph, "Your Girl" (directors Ft. Langley)
- Jessie Reyez, "Body Count" (director Peter Huang)
- Said the Whale, "UnAmerican" (director Johnny Jansen)

==== Longlist ====
- Arkells, "People's Champ" (director Matt Barnes)
- Rich Aucoin, "The Middle" (director Meags Fitzgerald)
- Bahamas, "No Depression" (director Ali Eisner)
- The Belle Game, "Low" (director Kevan Funk)
- Jean-Michel Blais, "Dans ma main" (directors Melissa Matos and Emmanuel Mauriès-Rinfret)
- Blue Hawaii, "Do You Need Me" (director Kevan Funk)
- Cadence Weapon, "High Rise" (director Lester Millado)
- Charlotte Cardin, "The Kids" (director Kristof Brandl)
- Clairmont the Second, "Gheeze" (director Clairmont the Second)
- Classified, "Powerless" (director Andy Hines)
- Daniel Caesar feat. H.E.R., "Best Part, a Visual" (directors Keavan Yazdani and Sean Brown)
- Deadmau5, "Monophobia" (directors Nick DenBoer and Kenny Hotz)
- Drake, "Nice For What" (director Karena Evans)
- Harrison ft. Ralph, "Your Girl" (directors Ft. Langley)
- Jessie Reyez, "Body Count" (director Peter Huang)
- Said the Whale, "UnAmerican" (director Johnny Jansen)
- So Loki, "Athletes World" (director Lucas Hrubizna)
- SonReal, "Have a Nice Day" (director Peter Huang)
- Chad VanGaalen, "Host Body" (director Chad VanGaalen)
- The Weather Station, "Impossible" (director Colin Medley)

=== 2020 ===
The longlist for the 2020 Prism Prize was announced in February 2020, with the shortlist originally slated to be announced on April 2 and the winner to be announced on May 11. Due to the COVID-19 pandemic in Canada, however, the prize committee cancelled the May 11 event, and postponed the announcement of the winners to July 22 for the special awards, and July 23 for the topline categories. In addition, they opted not to issue a shortlist, instead announcing that all 20 longlisted nominees would be eligible for the final awards.

==== Winners ====
- Prism Prize: Jessie Reyez, "Far Away" (director Peter Huang)
- Audience Award: Daniel Caesar ft. Koffee, "CYANIDE REMIX" (directors Keavan Yazdani, Sean Brown)
- Hi-Fidelity Award: Daniela Andrade
- Lipsett Award: Tranquilo
- Willie Dunn Award: Laurieann Gibson
- Special Achievement Award: Bardia Zeinali

==== Longlist ====
- Alaskan Tapes, "And, We Disappear" (director Meredith Hama-Brown)
- BAMBII ft. Pamputtae, "NITEVISION" (directors BAMBII, Kostadin Kolev)
- Basia Bulat, "Your Girl" (director Brian Dale Sokolowski)
- Cartel Madras, "Goonda Gold" (directors Bhaveek Makan, Jashan Makan)
- Clairmont the Second, "Brick" (director Clairmont the Second)
- Daniel Caesar ft. Koffee, "CYANIDE REMIX" (directors Keavan Yazdani, Sean Brown)
- Debby Friday, "Fatal" (directors Debby Friday, Ryan Ermacora)
- Doomsquad, "General Hum" (director Zak Tatham)
- iskwē, "Breaking Down" (director Jessica Lea Fleming)
- Jeremy Dutcher, "Mehcinut" (directors Chandler Levack, Jeremy Dutcher)
- Jessie Reyez, "Far Away" (director Peter Huang)
- Jordan Klassen, "Virtuous Circle" (director Farhad Ghaderi)
- Mac DeMarco, "Here Comes the Cowboy" (director Cole Kush)
- Orville Peck, "Dead of Night" (director Michael Maxxis)
- PUP, "Free at Last" (directors PUP, Jeremy Schaulin-Rioux, Amanda Fotes)
- PUP, "Kids" (director Jeremy Schaulin-Rioux)
- Said the Whale, "Record Shop" (director Johnny Jansen)
- Sam Tudor, "Joseph in the Bathroom" (director Lucas Hrubizna)
- Shad, "The Stone Throwers (Gone in a Blink)" (director Matthew Progress)
- Shay Lia, "Good Together" (director CARAZ)

=== 2021 ===
The longlisted nominees for the 2021 Prism Prize were announced on April 29, 2021, with the shortlist announced on June 9 and the winners announced on July 26.

==== Winners ====
- Prism Prize: Haviah Mighty, "Thirteen" (director Theo Kapodistrias)
- Audience Award: Aquakultre, "Pay It Forward" (directors Evan Elliot and Lance Sampson)
- Hi-Fidelity Award: Crack Cloud
- Lipsett Award: Gennelle Cruz
- Willie Dunn Award: Leanne Betasamosake Simpson
- Special Achievement Award: Jordan Oram

==== Shortlist ====
- Andy Shauf, "Clove Cigarette" (directors Colin Medley, Jared Raab, and Luca Tarantini)
- Clairmont the Second, "DUN" (director Clairmont Humphrey)
- Haviah Mighty, "Thirteen" (director Theo Kapodistrias)
- Lido Pimienta, "Nada" (director Paz Ramirez)
- Mustafa, "Air Forces" (directors Glenn Michael and Christo)
- Rich Aucoin, "Walls" (director Jason Levangie)
- Savannah Ré, "Opia Experience" (director Yasmin Evering-Kerr)
- Sean Leon, "90 BPM" (director Sean Leon)
- Tobi, "24 (Toronto Remix)" (director Kit Weyman)
- Witch Prophet, "Tesfay" (director Leah Vlemmiks)

==== Longlist ====
- Andy Shauf, "Clove Cigarette" (directors Colin Medley and Jared Raab)
- Aquakultre, "Pay It Forward" (directors Evan Elliot and Lance Sampson)
- Braids, "Young Buck" (director Kevin Calero)
- Clairmont the Second, "DUN" (director Clairmont Humphrey)
- Daniela Andrade, "Tamale" (directors Justin Singer and Daniela Andrade)
- Haviah Mighty, "Thirteen" (director Theo Kapodistrias)
- Jessie Reyez, "Love in the Dark" (director Se Oh)
- July Talk, "Governess Shadow" (director Cosette Schulz)
- Kandle, "Lock and Load" (director Brandon William Fletcher)
- Lido Pimienta, "Nada" (director Paz Ramirez)
- Mustafa, "Air Forces" (directors Glenn Michael and Christo)
- Mustafa, "Stay Alive" (director King Bee Productions)
- Rich Aucoin, "Walls" (director Jason Levangie)
- Savannah Ré, "Opia Experience" (director Yasmin Evering-Kerr)
- Savannah Ré, "Solid" (director Alicia K. Harris)
- Sean Leon, "90 BPM" (director Sean Leon)
- The Weather Station, "Robber" (director Tamara Lindeman)
- Tobi, "24 (Toronto Remix)" (director Kit Weyman)
- U.S. Girls, "4 American Dollars" (directors Emily Pelstring and Meg Remy)
- Witch Prophet, "Tesfay" (director Leah Vlemmiks)

=== 2022 ===
==== Winners ====
- Prism Prize: Mustafa, "Ali"
- Audience Award: Khanvict, "Closer" (director Anjali Nayar)
- Hi-Fidelity Award: Chiiild
- Lipsett Award: Iris Kim
- Willie Dunn Award: Mustafa
- Special Achievement Award: Sammy Rawal

==== Shortlist ====
- Mustafa, "Ali" (director Mustafa)
- The Beaches, "Blow Up" (director Alex P. Smith)
- Khanvict, "Closer" (director Anjali Nayar)
- Debby Friday, "Focus" (directors Ryan Ermacora & Debby Friday)
- Simon Leoza, "La nuée" (director Vincent René-Lortie)
- Andy Shauf, "Living Room" (director Anne Douris)
- BadBadNotGood, "Love Proceeding" (director Jamal Burger)
- Haviah Mighty, "Protest" (directors Kit Weyman & Chrris Lowe)
- Chad VanGaalen, "Samurai Sword" (director Chad VanGaalen)
- BadBadNotGood, "Timid, Intimidating" (director Winston Hacking)

=== 2023 ===
==== Winners ====
- Prism Prize: Snotty Nose Rez Kids, "Damn Right" (director Sterling Larose)
- Audience Award: Dan Mangan, "Fire Escape" (director Lester Lyons-Hookham)
- Hi-Fidelity Award: Nemahsis
- Lipsett Award: Aimé Irabahaye
- Willie Dunn Award: Sara Elgamal
- Special Achievement Award: Adrian Villagomez

==== Shortlist ====
- BAMBII, "Ride with Me" (directors Kit Weyman & BAMBII)
- Jean-Michel Blais, "Passepied" (director Adrian Villagomez)
- Dan Mangan, "Fire Escape" (director Lester Lyons-Hookham)
- MorMor, "Here It Goes Again" (director Adrian Villagomez)
- PUP, "Totally Fine" (director Jeremy Schaulin-Rioux)
- Jessie Reyez, "Mutual Friend" (director Peter Huang)
- Snotty Nose Rez Kids, "Damn Right" (director Sterling Larose)
- Amanda Sum, "Different Than Before" (director Mayumi Yoshida)
- Tanya Tagaq, "Colonizer" (directors Leah Fay Goldstein & Peter Dreimanis)
- Tanya Tagaq, "Teeth Agape" (director David Seitz)

=== 2024 ===
==== Winners ====
- Prism Prize: Mustafa, "Name of God" (director Mustafa)
- Audience Award: Nemahsis, "I Wanna Be Your Right Hand" (directors Norman Wong, Amy Gardner)
- Hi-Fidelity Award: Shy Kids
- Lipsett Award: Jessamine Yú Fok
- Willie Dunn Award: TOBi
- Special Achievement Award: Ethan Tobman

==== Shortlist ====
- Alaskan Tapes, "Of Woods and Seas" (director Andrew De Zen)
- Apashe feat. Magugu, "Revenge of the Orchestra" (director Adrian Villagomez)
- The Beaches, "Blame Brett" (director Ievy Stamatov)
- Feist, "Borrow Trouble" (directors Mary Rozzi, Colby Richardson, Heather Goodchild, Leslie Feist)
- Dominique Fils-Aimé, "My Mind at Ease" (director Adrian Villagomez)
- Mustafa, "Name of God" (director Mustafa)
- Nemahsis, "I Wanna Be Your Right Hand" (directors Norman Wong, Amy Gardner)
- Allison Russell, "Demons" (director Ethan Tobman)
- Snotty Nose Rez Kids, "I'm Good" (director Sterling Larose)
- young friend, "feral canadian scaredy cat" (directors Sterling Larose, Zachary Vague)
