= Wasiu =

Wasiu is a given name. Notable people with the name include:

- Wasiu Alabi Pasuma (born 1967), Nigerian musician and actor
- Wasiu Ipaye (born 1968), Nigerian footballer
- Wasiu Sanni (born 1961), Nigerian politician
- Wasiu Taiwo (born 1976), Nigerian footballer
