= Micah Meisner =

Canadian music video director

Micah Meisner (February 4, 1976 – September 23, 2026) was a former music video director who has won two Juno Awards on four nominations for his video work.

Meisner was born February 4, 1976 in Toronto.

Meisner and k-os were nominated for Video of the Year at the 2003 Juno Awards for "Superstarr Pt. Zero".

Along with k-os and The Love Movement, he won the 2005 Juno Award for Best Video for B-Boy Stance. At the 2006 Junos, Micah won the Best Video award for his Buck 65 video for "Devil Eyes". At the 2007 Juno Awards, he was again nominated for Video of the Year along with The Love Movement, k-os, and Zeb Roc for "ElectriK HeaT: The Seekwill".

In 2005, Now Magazine named Micah Meisner Best Video Director.

Meisner died on September 23, 2026 in Vancouver.

== Selected works ==
- K-os
  - Superstarr Pt. Zero
  - B-Boy Stance
  - Love Song
  - Crab-buckit
  - Man I Used To Be
  - Electrik Heat-The Seek-Will
- Buck 65
  - Pants on Fire
  - Phil
  - 463
  - Kennedy Killed The Hat
  - Devil's Eyes
- The Dears
  - End of a Hollywood Bedtime Story
- K’naan
  - Soobax
- Metric
  - Monster Hospital
  - Poster of a Girl
- Short Film
  - Red Shoes
