= Saint Veronika =

Single by Billy Talent

from the album Billy Talent III
- Released: March 19, 2010
- Genre: Punk rock, post-hardcore
- Length: 4:09
- Label: Warner, Roadrunner
- Songwriter(s): Billy Talent
- Producer(s): Brendan O'Brien

Billy Talent singles chronology
| "Devil on My Shoulder" (2009) | "Saint Veronika" (2010) | "Diamond on a Landmine" (2010) |

Music video
- "Saint Veronika" on YouTube

"Saint Veronika" is the third official single by Billy Talent from their fourth album, Billy Talent III.

== Music video ==
The music video premiered on February 1, 2010 on MySpace, and was directed by Michael Maxxis. The video starts with a family of dolls sitting down at dinner when the father gets angry at his daughter (likely Veronika); she flees the room, over to a shelf and grabs a couple of tools. The story is intercut with scenes of Billy Talent playing this song in a shed while other dolls' wheels are spinning thread. The girl leaves the house, jumps over a fence and unwittingly gets one of her threads stuck on a nail. Suddenly the other dolls try to chase her, possibly trying to convince her to come back. When they get to the fence they notice that her thread is stuck on the fence, and give up. The girl keeps running, not noticing the thread caught on the fence is slowly unraveling her and leading to her demise, and at the end of the video she collapses with barely any of her body left.

== Track listing ==
=== CD single ===
1. "Saint Veronika" - 4:09
2. "Line & Sinker" (live at the Horseshoe Tavern) - 4:06
3. "Saint Veronika" (music video)- 4:18

== Cultural reference ==
The song was based on the novel Veronika Decides to Die by Paulo Coelho. According to vocalist Ben Kowalewicz, The Alchemist, another of Coelho's books, is the band's "bible".

== Live Performances ==
Billy Talent performed the song at the 2010 Juno Awards in St. John's.

== Charts ==
| Chart (2010) | Peak position |
|---|---|
| Canada (Canadian Hot 100) | 62 |

== Certifications ==
| Region | Certification | Certified units/sales |
|---|---|---|
| Canada (Music Canada) | Gold | 40,000^{‡} |
^{‡} Sales+streaming figures based on certification alone.
