= Hits (Billy Talent album) =

Compilation album by Billy Talent
- Released: November 4, 2014
- Recorded: 2003–2014
- Genre: Alternative rock; pop-punk; punk rock; post-hardcore; emo
- Length: 49:12
- Label: Warner; The End
- Producer: Gavin Brown; Brendan O'Brien; Ian D'Sa; Howard Benson

Billy Talent chronology
Dead Silence (2012)	Hits (2014)	Afraid of Heights (2016)

Singles from Hits
- 1. "Kingdom of Zod" Released: September 25, 2014; 2. "Chasing the Sun" Released: October 31, 2014

Hits is the greatest hits album by Canadian rock band Billy Talent released November 4, 2014, via Warner Music Canada and The End Records. The album features the band's most popular singles from their last four studio albums, with the addition of two brand new songs, "Kingdom of Zod" and "Chasing the Sun".

To promote the compilation, the opening page of the band's website was transformed into what they called a "Video Vault", a video archive. The first video was an introduction from frontman Ben Kowalewicz, explaining the idea of the vault. In the two weeks that followed, the band, starting with "Try Honesty", posted the official video of one of the songs (with the exception of "Kingdom of Zod" and "Chasing the Sun", which at that point were unreleased and had no official video). Additional videos related anecdotes and explanations for that day's song from the band members themselves (who appeared in pairs; Ben and Aaron, and Ian and Jon) were also added via YouTube. One of the new songs, "Kingdom of Zod", was released as a single on September 25, 2014, via iTunes pre-order.

== Track listing ==
All tracks are written by Billy Talent.

No.	Title	Album	Length
1.	"Try Honesty"	Billy Talent	4:13
2.	"River Below"	Billy Talent	3:00
3.	"Nothing to Lose"	Billy Talent	3:38
4.	"Devil in a Midnight Mass"	Billy Talent II	2:52
5.	"Red Flag"	Billy Talent II	3:16
6.	"Fallen Leaves"	Billy Talent II	3:19
7.	"Surrender"	Billy Talent II	4:06
8.	"Devil on My Shoulder"	Billy Talent III	3:49
9.	"Rusted from the Rain"	Billy Talent III	4:13
10.	"Viking Death March"	Dead Silence	4:04
11.	"Surprise Surprise"	Dead Silence	3:08
12.	"Stand Up and Run"	Dead Silence	3:20
13.	"Kingdom of Zod"	previously unreleased	3:32
14.	"Chasing the Sun"	previously unreleased	2:42
Total length:			49:12

== Chart performance ==
Chart (2014–2021)	Peak position
Canadian Albums (Billboard)	15
German Albums (Offizielle Top 100)	64
Swiss Albums (Schweizer Hitparade)	79

== Certifications ==
Region	Certification	Certified units/sales
Canada (Music Canada)	2× Platinum	160,000^{‡}
^{‡} Sales+streaming figures based on certification alone.
