= MuchMusic Video Award for Best Video =

The following is a list of the MuchMusic Video Awards winners and nominees for Best Video.

== 1990s ==
Year	Artist	Video	Ref
1990	Cowboy Junkies	"Sun Comes Up (It's Tuesday Morning)"	
1991	Crash Test Dummies	"Superman's Song"	
1992	54-40	"She La"	
1992	Tom Cochrane	"Life Is a Highway"	
1992	Tom Cochrane	"No Regrets"	
1992	Lisa Lougheed	"Love Vibe"	
1993	The Tragically Hip	"Locked in the Trunk of a Car"	
1993	Jann Arden	"I Would Die for You"	
1993	Barney Bentall and the Legendary Hearts	"Livin' in the 90s"	
1993	Leonard Cohen	"Closing Time"	
1993	The Rankin Family	"Fare Thee Well Love"	
1994	Blue Rodeo	"Hasn't Hit Me Yet"	
1994	54-40	"Blame Your Parents"	
1994	Moist	"Push"	
1994	Rush	"Stick It Out"	
1994	Spirit of the West	"And if Venice Is Sinking"	
1995	Jann Arden	"Insensitive"	
1995	Odds	"Eat My Brain"	
1995	Our Lady Peace	"Hope"	
1995	The Tea Party	"The Bazaar"	
1995	The Tragically Hip	"Nautical Disaster"	
1996	The Tragically Hip	"Ahead by a Century"	
1996	I Mother Earth	"One More Astronaut"	
1996	Ashley MacIsaac	"Brenda Stubbert"	
1996	Rusty	"Misogyny"	
1996	The Tea Party	"Sister Awake"	
1997	Moist	"Tangerine"	
1997	King Cobb Steelie	"Rational"	
1997	Our Lady Peace	"Superman's Dead"	
1997	The Tea Party	"Temptation"	
1997	The Tragically Hip	"Gift Shop"	
1998	Love Inc.	"Broken Bones"	
1998	Birth Through Knowledge	"Peppyrock"	
1998	Matthew Good Band	"Apparitions"	
1998	Sarah McLachlan	"Sweet Surrender"	
1998	The Tea Party	"Release"	
1999	Len	"Steal My Sunshine"	
1999	Edwin	"Hang Ten"	
1999	Infinite	"Take a Look"	
1999	Prozzäk	"Sucks to Be You"	
1999	Sky	"Love Song"	

== 2000s ==
Year	Artist	Video	Ref
2000	Matthew Good Band	"Load Me Up"	
2000	Choclair	"Let's Ride"	
2000	Edwin	"Alive"	
2000	Chantal Kreviazuk	"Before You"	
2000	Matthew Good Band	"Strange Days"	
2001	Our Lady Peace	"In Repair"	
2001	Baby Blue Soundcrew feat. Choclair and Mr. Mims	"Love 'Em All"	
2001	Baby Blue Soundcrew feat. Kardinal Offishall, Sean Paul and Jully Black	"Money Jane"	
2001	Bran Van 3000 feat. Curtis Mayfield	"Astounded"	
2001	Snow	"The Plumb Song"	
2002	Nickelback	"Too Bad"	
2002	Chad Kroeger and Josey Scott	"Hero"	
2002	Nickelback	"How You Remind Me"	
2002	Sum 41	"It's What We're All About"	
2002	Swollen Members	"Fuel Injected"	
2003	Our Lady Peace	"Innocent"	
2003	Matthew Good Band	"In a World Called Catastrophe"	
2003	Shawn Desman	"Get Ready"	
2003	Swollen Members	"Breath"	
2003	Treble Charger	"Hundred Million"	
2004	Finger Eleven	"One Thing"	
2004	Billy Talent	"Try Honesty"	
2004	Nelly Furtado	"Powerless (Say What You Want)"	
2004	Pilate	"Into Your Hideout"	
2004	Sam Roberts	"Hard Road"	
2005	Billy Talent	"River Below"	
2005	Billy Talent	"Nothing to Lose"	
2005	k-os	"Crabbuckit"	
2005	k-os	"Man I Used to Be"	
2005	Simple Plan	"Untitled (How Could This Happen to Me)"	
2006	Kardinal Offishall feat. Ray Robinson	"Everyday (Rudebwoy)"	
2006	Billy Talent	"Devil in a Midnight Mass"	
2006	Buck 65	"Devil's Eyes"	
2006	Nickelback	"Photograph"	
2006	The Trews	"So She's Leaving"	
2007	Billy Talent	"Fallen Leaves"	
2007	Belly feat. Ginuwine	"Pressure"	
2007	Finger Eleven	"Paralyzer"	
2007	Nickelback	"If Everyone Cared"	
2007	Three Days Grace	"Never Too Late"	
2008	Hedley	"For the Nights I Can't Remember"	
2008	Belly feat. Mario Winans	"Ridin'"	
2008	Feist	"1234"	
2008	illScarlett	"Nothing Special"	
2008	Simple Plan	"When I'm Gone"	
2009	Nickelback	"Gotta Be Somebody"	
2009	Danny Fernandes	"Private Dancer"	
2009	k-os	"4, 3, 2, 1 "	
2009	Marianas Trench	"Cross My Heart"	
2009	The Stills	"Being Here"	

== 2010s ==
Year	Artist	Video	Ref
2010	Hedley	"Perfect"	
2010	Billy Talent	"Devil on My Shoulder"	
2010	Danny Fernandes	"Addicted"	
2010	Nickelback	"I'd Come For You"	
2010	Stereos	"Summer Girl"	
2011	Shawn Desman	"Electric/Night Like This"	
2011	Fefe Dobson	"Ghost"	
2011	Down With Webster	"Whoa Is Me"	
2011	Danny Fernandes feat. Belly	"Automatic"	
2011	Blake McGrath	"Relax"	
2012	Carly Rae Jepsen	"Call Me Maybe"	
2012	Justin Bieber	"Boyfriend"	
2012	Drake	"Headlines"	
2012	Hedley feat. P. Reign	"Invincible"	
2012	Marianas Trench	"Fallout"	
2013	Classified feat. David Myles	"Inner Ninja"	
2013	Drake	"Started from the Bottom"	
2013	Marianas Trench	"Desperate Measures"	
2013	Serena Ryder	"Stompa"	
2013	The Weeknd	"Wicked Games"	
2014	Hedley	"Anything"	
2014	Arcade Fire	"Afterlife"	
2014	Drake	"Worst Behavior"	
2014	SonReal	"Everywhere We Go"	
2014	The Weeknd feat. Drake	"Live For"	
2015	The Weeknd	"Often"	
2015	Arcade Fire	"We Exist"	
2015	Grimes f. Blood Diamonds	"Go"	
2015	Majid Jordan	"Her"	
2015	Kiesza	"Giant in My Heart"	
2016	Drake	"Hotline Bling"	
2016	Alessia Cara	"Here"	
2016	Belly feat. The Weeknd	"Might Not"	
2016	Grimes	"Flesh without Blood"	
2016	Shawn Mendes and Camila Cabello	"I Know What You Did Last Summer"	
2017	A Tribe Called Red feat. Yasiin Bey, Narcy and Black Bear	"R.E.D."	
2017	Coleman Hell	"Fireproof"	
2017	Kaytranada feat. Anderson .Paak	"Glowed Up"	
2017	Shawn Mendes	"Mercy"	
2017	PUP	"Sleep in the Heat"	
2018	Logic feat. Alessia Cara and Khalid	"1-800-273-8255"	
2018	Shawn Mendes	"In My Blood"	
2018	Halsey	"Bad at Love"	
2018	Drake	"God's Plan"	
2018	Childish Gambino	"This Is America"	
2018	Ariana Grande	"No Tears Left To Cry"	
