= Juno Awards of 2013 =

Edition of Canadian music awards

- The 2013 Juno Awards Logo
- Date: 20–21 April 2013
- Venue: Brandt Centre, Regina, Saskatchewan
- Hosted by: Michael Bublé

Television/radio coverage
- Network: CTV

The Juno Awards of 2013 honoured Canadian music industry achievements in the latter part of 2011 and in most of 2012. The awards were presented in Regina, Saskatchewan, Canada, during the weekend of 20–21 April 2013. The main ceremony was hosted by Michael Bublé at the Brandt Centre. The city of Moose Jaw also hosted some supporting events.

== Events ==
The Juno Cup charity hockey game was held in Moose Jaw at Mosaic Place.

Most awards were presented at a private gala on 20 April at the Credit Union Eventplex.

=== Main ceremony performers ===
The main awards ceremony was held at the Brandt Centre on 21 April and televised on CTV. The following artists performed the setlist below in order during the ceremony:

- Serena Ryder - "Stompa"
- The Sheepdogs - "Feeling Good"
- Carly Rae Jepsen - "Call Me Maybe" and "Tonight I'm Getting Over You"
- The Tenors - "Forever Young"
- Marianas Trench - "Fallout" and "Stutter"
- Michael Bublé - "It's a Beautiful Day"
- Billy Talent - "Stand Up and Run" with Serena Ryder
- Classified - "Inner Ninja" with David Myles
- Hannah Georgas - "Robotic"
- Metric - "Synthetica"
- k.d. lang - "Sing It Loud"
- Michael Bublé - "Home"

== Nominees and winners ==
Nominees were announced on 19 February 2013. Music journalist Larry Leblanc was this year's Walt Grealis Special Achievement Award recipient.

This year's inductee to the Canadian Music Hall of Fame is k.d. lang.

Tom Cochrane was the year's recipient of the Allan Waters Humanitarian Award, based on the musician's significant support for various charities.

Most awards were announced at the private gala on 20 April.

=== People ===
Artist of the Year	Group of the Year
Leonard Cohen; Justin Bieber; Deadmau5; Carly Rae Jepsen; Johnny Reid	Marianas Trench; Billy Talent; Metric; Rush; The Sheepdogs
Breakthrough Artist of the Year	Breakthrough Group of the Year
The Weeknd; Cold Specks; Shawn Hook; Grimes; Kira Isabella	Monster Truck; Hey Ocean!; The Pack A.D.; Walk off the Earth; Yukon Blonde
Fan Choice Award	Songwriter of the Year
Justin Bieber; Michael Bublé; Leonard Cohen; Céline Dion; Drake; Hedley; Carly Rae Jepsen; Marianas Trench; Metric; Nickelback	Leonard Cohen – "Amen", "Going Home" (co-songwriter Patrick Leonard), and "Show Me the Place" (co-songwriter Patrick Leonard) from Old Ideas; Arkells – "Michigan Left", "On Paper", "Whistleblower" from Michigan Left; Kathleen Edwards – "A Soft Place to Land" (co-songwriter John Roderick), "Chameleon/Comedian", and "Change the Sheets" from Voyageur; Hannah Georgas – "Enemies", "Robotic" (co-songwriter Ryan Guldemond), and "Somebody" from Hannah Georgas; Afie Jurvanen – "Be My Witness", "Caught Me Thinkin", and "Lost in the Light" from Barchords by Bahamas
Producer of the Year	Recording Engineer of the Year
James Shaw – "Youth Without Youth" and "Breathing Underwater" from Synthetica by Metric; Gavin Brown – "At Transformation" and "About this Map" from Now for Plan A by The Tragically Hip; Kevin Churko (co-producer Kane Churko) – "Blood" and "Adrenalize" from Blood by In This Moment; Bob Ezrin – "Forever Young" from Lead with Your Heart by The Tenors; Josh Ramsay – "Call Me Maybe" from Kiss by Carly Rae Jepsen; "Fallout" from Ever After by Marianas Trench	Kevin Churko (co-engineer Kane Churko) – "Blood" from Blood by In This Moment; "Coming Down" from American Capitalist by Five Finger Death Punch; Joby Baker – "Suspiro en Falsete" and "Ruido en el Sistema" from Ruido en el sistema by Alex Cuba; Mike Plotnikoff – "Start of Something Good" from Break the Spell by Daughtry; "Breaking Your Heart" from Stronger by Kelly Clarkson; Eric Ratz – "Albatross" from Albatross by Big Wreck; "Surprise Surprise" from Dead Silence by Billy Talent; Randy Staub "When We Stand Together" from Here and Now by Nickelback; "What You Want" from Evanescence by Evanescence

=== Albums ===
Album of the Year	Aboriginal Album of the Year
Carly Rae Jepsen, Kiss; Justin Bieber, Believe; Céline Dion, Sans attendre; Hedley, Storms; Marianas Trench, Ever After	Crystal Shawanda, Just Like You; Don Amero, Heart on My Sleeve; Burnt Project 1, The Black List; Janet Panic, Samples; Donny Parenteau, Bring It On
Adult Alternative Album of the Year	Adult Contemporary Album of the Year
Serena Ryder, Harmony; Bahamas, Barchords; The Barr Brothers, The Barr Brothers; Kathleen Edwards, Voyageur; Royal Wood, We Were Born to Glory	The Tenors, Lead With Your Heart; Barlow, Burning Days; Adam Cohen, Like a Man; Céline Dion, Sans attendre; Raylene Rankin, All the Diamonds
Alternative Album of the Year	Blues Album of the Year
Metric, Synthetica; Hannah Georgas, Hannah Georgas; Japandroids, Celebration Rock; Said the Whale, Little Mountain; Stars, The North	Steve Strongman, A Natural Fact; Steve Hill, Solo Recordings Volume One; Colin James, Fifteen; Jack de Keyzer, Electric Love; Shakura S'Aida, Time
Children's Album of the Year	Classical Album of the Year – Solo or Chamber Ensemble
Emilie Mover, The Stella and Sam Album, ft. Emilie Mover; Helen Austin, Always Be a Unicorn; Jennifer Gasoi, Throw a Penny in the Wishing Well; Henri Godon, Chansons pour toutes sorts d’enfants; Marlowe & the MiX, One Dancefloor	Amici Chamber Ensemble, Levant; Canadian Brass, Canadian Brass Takes Flight; James Ehnes, Bartók : Works for Violin and Piano, Vol. 1; Angela Hewitt, Debussy: Solo Piano Music; Triple Forte, Ravel, Shostakovich, Ives: Piano Trio
Classical Album of the Year – Large Ensemble or Soloist(s) with Large Ensemble Accompaniment	Classical Album of the Year – Vocal or Choral Performance
James Ehnes, Tchaikovsky: Violin Concerto; Jan Lisiecki, Mozart: Piano Concertos Nos. 20 & 21; Antonio Peruch, Edmonton Symphony Orchestra, Logos Futura; Tafelmusik Baroque Orchestra, The Galileo Project; Bramwell Tovey/Vancouver Symphony Orchestra, Fugitive Colours	Karina Gauvin, Prima Donna; Elora Festival Singers, I Saw Eternity; Gerald Finley, Schumann: Liederkreis; Marie-Nicole Lemieux, Opera Arias; Tafelmusik Baroque Orchestra and Chamber Choir, Handel Messiah
Contemporary Christian/Gospel Album of the Year	Country Album of the Year
The City Harmonic, I Have a Dream (It Feels Like Home); Colin Bernard, Hold On; Manafest, Fighter; Newworldson, Rebel Transmission; Thousand Foot Krutch, The End Is Where We Begin	Johnny Reid, Fire It Up; Dean Brody, Dirt; Chad Brownlee, Love Me or Leave Me; Emerson Drive, Roll; Dallas Smith, Jumped Right In
Electronic Album of the Year	Francophone Album of the Year
Grimes, Visions; Crystal Castles, (III); Daphni, Jiaolong; Purity Ring, Shrines; Trust, TRST	Louis-Jean Cormier, Le treizième étage; Amylie, Le Royaume; Marie-Pierre Arthur, Aux alentours; Avec pas d'casque, Astronomie; Lisa Leblanc, Lisa Leblanc
Instrumental Album of the Year	International Album of the Year
Pugs and Crows, Fantastic Pictures; Five Alarm Funk, Rock the Sky; Ian McDougall, The Very Thought of You; Ratchet Orchestra, Hemlock; Hugh Sicotte/Jon Ballantyne, Twenty Accident Free Work Days	Mumford & Sons, Babel; Maroon 5, Overexposed; One Direction, Up All Night; Rod Stewart, Merry Christmas, Baby; Taylor Swift, Red
Contemporary Jazz Album of the Year	Traditional Jazz Album of the Year
Joel Miller, Swim; Alex Goodman Quintet, Bridges; Allison Au Quartet, The Sky Was Pale Blue, Then Grey; François Houle 5+1, Genera; Rafael Zaldivar, Drawing	Mike Murley, Ed Bickert and Steve Wallace, Test of Time; Shirantha Beddage, Identity; Brian Dickinson Quartet, Other Places; Cory Weeds Quartet, Up a Step; Dave Young/Terry Promane Octet, Volume One
Vocal Jazz Album of the Year	Metal/Hard Music Album of the Year
Emilie-Claire Barlow, Seule ce soir; Diana Krall, Glad Rag Doll; Diana Panton, Christmas Kiss; Elizabeth Shepherd, Rewind; Carol Welsman, Journey	Woods of Ypres, Woods 5: Grey Skies & Electric Light; Cancer Bats, Dead Set on Living; Castle, Blacklands; Devin Townsend Project, Epicloud; Ex Deo, Caligvla
Pop Album of the Year	Rock Album of the Year
Carly Rae Jepsen, Kiss; Justin Bieber, Believe; Victoria Duffield, Shut Up and Dance; Nelly Furtado, The Spirit Indestructible; Kristina Maria, Tell the World	Rush, Clockwork Angels; Big Wreck, Albatross; Billy Talent, Dead Silence; The Sheepdogs, The Sheepdogs; The Tragically Hip, Now for Plan A
Roots & Traditional Album of the Year – Solo	Roots & Traditional Album of the Year – Group
Rose Cousins, We Have Made a Spark; Annabelle Chvostek, Rise; Amelia Curran, Spectators; Corb Lund, Cabin Fever; Old Man Luedecke, Tender Is the Night	Elliott Brood, Days Into Years; Great Lake Swimmers, New Wild Everywhere; The Strumbellas, My Father and the Hunter; Le Vent du Nord, Tromper le temps; The Wooden Sky, Every Child a Daughter, Every Moon a Sun
World Music Album of the Year
Lorraine Klaasen, Tribute to Miriam Makeba; Alex Cuba, Ruido en el Sistema; Jaffa Road, Where the Light Gets In; Danny Michel, Black Birds Are Dancing Over Me; The Souljazz Orchestra, Solidarity

=== Songs and recordings ===
Single of the Year	Classical Composition of the Year
Carly Rae Jepsen, "Call Me Maybe"; Billy Talent, "Viking Death March"; Hedley, "Kiss You Inside Out"; Serena Ryder, "Stompa"; The Sheepdogs, "The Way It Is"	Vivian Fung, "Violin Concerto"; Denis Gougeon, "Mutation"; Alexina Louie, "Echoes of Time"; R. Murray Schafer, "Trio for Violin, Viola and Cello"; Howard Shore, The Lord of the Rings Symphony: Six Movements for Orchestra & Chorus
Dance Recording of the Year	R&B/Soul Recording of the Year
Anjulie, You and I; Felix Cartal, "Don’t Turn on the Lights" (featuring Polina); Vita Chambers, "Fix You"; Tricky Moreira, "Hello Hello Hello"; Dragonette, Bodyparts	The Weeknd, Trilogy; Jully Black, "Fugitive"; Shawn Desman, "Nobody Does It Like You"; Melanie Fiona, "Change the Record"; Kreesha Turner, Tropic Electric
Rap Recording of the Year	Reggae Recording of the Year
Classified, "Inner Ninja" (featuring David Myles); JD Era, No Handouts; Rich Kidd/SonReal, The Closers; Madchild, Dope Sick; Maestro Fresh Wes, Black Tuxedo EP	Exco Levi, "Storms of Life"; Ammoye, "Radio"; Melanie Durrant, "Made for Love"; Makeshift Innocence, "Yours to Keep"; Elaine Lil'Bit Shepherd, Move Ya’

=== Other ===
Music DVD of the Year	Recording Package of the Year
Bobcaygeon – Andy Keen, Bernie Breen, Patrick Sambrook, Shawn Marino, The Tragically Hip; Better Off – Ben Knechtel, Ten Second Epic; The Orchestrion Project: Pat Metheny – Pierre Lamoureux, François Lamoureux, Pat Metheny; Joe Bonamassa Live from New York: Beacon Theatre – Scot McFadyen, Roy Weisman, Kevin Shirley, Joe Bonamassa; KAESHAMMERLIVE! – Tim Martin, W. Tom Berry, Michael Kaeshammer	Synthetica – Metric; Justin Broadbent (art director/designer/photographer): Little Mountain – Said the Whale; Andy Dixon (art director/designer/photographer), Johnathan Taggart (photographer): À l’aube du printemps – Mes Aïeux; Marianne Chevalier and Atelier Tricorne (art directors/designers/photographers): Le Québec est mort, Vive le Québec! – Loco Locass; Mathieu Houde (art director), Philippe Allard (designer/photographer), Marie-Pier Daigle (designer): Now for Plan A – The Tragically Hip; Susan Michalek and Simon Paul (art directors/designers), Andrew B. Myers (photographer)
Video of the Year
"HYFR" – Drake; Director X, director: "Testify" – Alan Doyle; Margaret Malandruccolo, director: "Fire It Up" – Johnny Reid; Margaret Malandruccolo, director: "Little Boxes" – Walk off the Earth; Sean Wainsteim, director: "Little Talks" – Of Monsters and Men; WeWereMonkeys (Mihai Wilson, director; Marcella Moser, producer)

== Compilation album ==
Juno Awards 2013

Compilation album by Various Artists
- Released: 19 March 2013
- Label: Warner Music Canada

Warner Music Canada released a compilation album of songs from the year's Juno nominees on 19 March 2013. Sales of the album support the CARAS music education charity MusiCounts.

No.	Title	Artist	Length
1.	"Call Me Maybe"	Carly Rae Jepsen
2.	"Boyfriend"	Justin Bieber
3.	"Kiss You Inside Out"	Hedley
4.	"Desperate Measures"	Marianas Trench
5.	"Breathing Underwater"	Metric
6.	"Surprise Surprise"	Billy Talent
7.	"Feeling Good"	The Sheepdogs
8.	"Shut Up and Dance"	Victoria Duffield
9.	"The Veldt"	deadmau5 (with Chris James)
10.	"Dedicated To You"	Johnny Reid
11.	"Stompa"	Serena Ryder
12.	"Albatross"	Big Wreck
13.	"Headlong Flight"	Rush
14.	"Darkness"	Leonard Cohen
15.	"Parler à mon père"	Celine Dion
16.	"Somebody That I Used to Know"	Walk off the Earth
17.	"Big Blue Wave"	Hey Ocean!
