= MuchMusic Video Award for Best Rock Video =

The following is a list of the MuchMusic Video Awards winners for MuchLOUD Best Rock Video from 1999 to 2011.

| Year | Artist | Video |
|---|---|---|
| 1999 | Edwin | "Hang Ten" |
| 2000 | Matthew Good Band | "Load Me Up" |
| 2001 | Sum 41 | "Makes No Difference" |
| 2002 | Nickelback | "Too Bad" |
| 2003 | Treble Charger | "Hundred Million" |
| 2004 | Billy Talent | "Try Honesty" |
| 2005 | Billy Talent | "River Below" |
| 2006 | Nickelback | "Photograph" |
| 2007 | Billy Talent | "Fallen Leaves" |
| 2008 | Hedley | "She's So Sorry" |
| 2009 | Nickelback | "Gotta Be Somebody" |
| 2010 | Billy Talent | "Devil on My Shoulder" |
| 2011 | Abandon All Ships | "Geeving" |
