= IHeartRadio MMVAs =

Canadian TV music award show (1990–2018)

iHeartRadio Much Music Video Awards
- Awarded for: Best in music videos
- Location: Much Headquarters, Toronto, Ontario, Canada
- Country: Canada
- Presented by: Much
- Formerly called: Canadian Music Video Awards (1990–1995); MuchMusic Video Awards (1996–2015); iHeartRadio MuchMusic Video Awards (2016–2017)
- First award: June 25, 1990; 36 years ago
- Final award: August 26, 2018; 8 years ago
- Website: mmva.muchmusic.com

The iHeartRadio Much Music Video Awards were an awards show broadcast annually on Much from 1990 to 2018, and Fuse from 2010 to 2013 that honoured the year's best music videos.

Originally debuting in 1990 as the Canadian Music Video Awards, the awards were renamed in 1995 to the MuchMusic Video Awards. In 2016, the show was rebranded under the iHeartRadio banner after Much's parent company, Bell Media, reached a licensing agreement with iHeartMedia. The show's full name was officially dropped in 2018. The 2018 edition would ultimately be the last, amidst the scaling back and eventual discontinuation of all music programming on the channel due to declining ratings.

== History ==
=== 1990–1995: As the Canadian Music Video Awards ===
The first Canadian Music Video Awards took place in 1990 on a three-week trip aboard a Canadian National Railway train across Canada. It was sponsored by Diet Pepsi and the train was dubbed "The Pepsi Train". Awards were handed out during its journey, which included 10 Canadian cities. In 1992 the CMVA's moved to the CityTV/MuchMusic studios in Toronto. In 1993 Michael Kennedy, director, and Kids In The Hall crowded into the Speaker's Corner booth outside the MuchMusic studios to accept the award for Best Comedy Video for "Terriers".

=== 1996–2015: MMVAs ===
Logo for the 1999 MuchMusic Video Awards.

In their modern form, the MMVAs were held as a large street party around 299 Queen Street West—the main downtown Toronto studios of Much and other properties owned by its parent company Bell Media. Much VJs introduced and interviewed presenters and winners throughout the show. Winners of a Much Music Video Award received a statue made by New York firm, Society Awards. Viewers could vote for the "Fan Fave" category which included Video, Artist or Group, and International Artist or Group.

In 2001, a show was not held due to the September 11 attacks occurring two weeks prior. However, awards were still handed out. All MMVA shows were subsequently held in June until 2017.

=== 2016–2018: iHeartRadio MMVAs ===
In 2016, Bell Media signed an exclusive pact with iHeartMedia and began co-branding the awards with iHeartRadio to "further elevate the MMVAs internationally."

In 2018, the show moved to August and its full name "MuchMusic Video Awards" was dropped. According to CTV Toronto, Bell Media "hopes the shift will help establish a new back-to-school event."

The iHeartRadio MMVAs were not held after 2018. Bell Media president Randy Lennox told The Canadian Press in 2019 that the awards were "delayed" due to "a massive concert in August and also the MTV awards were one day after our date, so we didn't think it was smart."

== List of Ceremonies ==
Year	Date	Co-host	Video of the Year Winner	Ref.
1990	June 25	—N/a	"Sun Comes Up (It’s Tuesday Morning)" by Cowboy Junkies	
1991	September 28	—N/a	"Superman's Song" by Crash Test Dummies	
1992	September 22	—N/a	"She La" by 54-40	
1993	September 30	—N/a	"Locked in the Trunk of a Car" by The Tragically Hip	
1994	September 29	—N/a	"Hasn't Hit Me Yet" by Blue Rodeo	
1995	September 28	—N/a	"Insensitive" by Jann Arden	
1996	September 19	—N/a	"Ahead by a Century" by The Tragically Hip	
1997	September 18	—N/a	"Tangerine" by Moist	
1998	September 29	—N/a	"Broken Bones" by Love Inc.	
1999	September 23	—N/a	"Steal My Sunshine" by Len	
2000	September 21	—N/a	"Load Me Up" by Matthew Good Band	
2001	September 23	—N/a	"In Repair" by Our Lady Peace	
2002	June 16	—N/a	"Too Bad" by Nickelback	
2003	June 22	—N/a	"Innocent" by Our Lady Peace	
2004	June 19	—N/a	"One Thing" by Finger Eleven	
2005	June 19	—N/a	"River Below" by Billy Talent	
2006	June 18	—N/a	"Everyday (Rudebwoy)" by Kardinal Offishall featuring Ray Robinson	
2007	June 17	—N/a	"Fallen Leaves" by Billy Talent	
2008	June 15	—N/a	"For the Nights I Can't Remember" by Hedley	
2009	June 21	Jonas Brothers	"Gotta Be Somebody" by Nickelback	
2010	June 20	Miley Cyrus	"Perfect" by Hedley	
2011	June 19	Selena Gomez	"Electric/Night Like This" by Shawn Desman	
2012	June 17	LMFAO	"Call Me Maybe" by Carly Rae Jepsen	
2013	June 16	Psy	"Inner Ninja" by Classified featuring David Myles	
2014	June 15	Kendall Jenner & Kylie Jenner	"Anything" by Hedley	
2015	June 21	Ed Sheeran	"Often" by The Weeknd	
2016	June 19	Gigi Hadid	"Hotline Bling" by Drake	
2017	June 18	Alessia Cara & Joe Jonas	"R.E.D." by A Tribe Called Red featuring Yasiin Bey, Narcy & Black Bear	
2018	August 26	Awkwafina	"1-800-273-8255" by Logic featuring Alessia Cara and Khalid	

== Appearances ==
=== Performances ===
Year	Performers	Ref.
1990	Maestro; Lee Aaron; Blue Rodeo; 54-40; Bruce Cockburn; The Northern Pikes; Jane Siberry; National Velvet; Jeff Healey Band; Murray McLauchlan; The Barra MacNeils	
1991	Colin James; Crash Test Dummies; Jeff Healey Band; Bootsauce; Helix; Grapes of Wrath; Dream Warriors	
1992	Tom Cochrane; Holly Cole; B-Fun; 54-40; Rheostatics; Slik Toxik; Mariah Carey; Organized Rhyme	
1993	Rankin Family; John James; Sven Gali; 13 Engines; Pure; Charlie Major	
1994	Bryan Adams; Blue Rodeo; Crash Test Dummies; 54-40; The Tea Party	
1995	Moist; Odds; Treble Charger; Sarah McLachlan; Dream Warriors; Raggadeath; Charlene Smith	
1996	I Mother Earth; Great Big Sea; Deborah Cox; Ashley MacIsaac; Hayden; Sloan; Saukrates; Crash Test Dummies (satellite performance from Helsinki); Front Line Assembly (satellite performance from the Vancouver Film School); Björk	
1997	Our Lady Peace; Bush; Blur; Amanda Marshall; The Tea Party; Corey Hart; Rascalz; Bran Van 3000	
1998	Smashing Pumpkins; Philosopher Kings; Barenaked Ladies; Goo Goo Dolls; Rascalz; Love Inc; Big Wreck; A Tribe Called Quest	
1999	98 Degrees; The Moffatts; Our Lady Peace; David Bowie; Britney Spears; Infinite; Len; Red Hot Chili Peppers; Sky; The Tea Party	
2000	Lenny Kravitz; The Guess Who; Barenaked Ladies; Moby; Destiny's Child; Blink 182; Matthew Good Band; Choclair; Souldecision and Thrust	
2001	Show cancelled due to the September 11 attacks.: B4-4; Baby Blue Soundcrew; Kardinal Offishall; Jully Black; Coldplay; Nelly Furtado; Incubus; Outkast; Our Lady Peace; Shaggy; Staind; Sum 41	
2002	Shakira; Nickelback; Swollen Members; Bow Wow; Sum 41; Puddle of Mudd; Avril Lavigne	
2003	Disturbed; Michelle Branch; Our Lady Peace; Sam Roberts; Sean Paul; Simple Plan; Avril Lavigne; Ashanti	
2004	Beastie Boys; Billy Talent; Evanescence; Fefe Dobson; Finger Eleven; Hilary Duff; Hoobastank; Kanye West; Three Days Grace	
2005	The Killers, Ashlee Simpson, k-os, Alexisonfire, The Black Eyed Peas, Arcade Fire, Ciara, Billy Talent	
2006	City and Colour; Metric; Hedley; Simple Plan; Yellowcard; Fall Out Boy; Nick Lachey; Rihanna; Nelly Furtado	
2007	Avril Lavigne; Maroon 5; Fergie; Billy Talent; The Used; Hilary Duff; Belly; Ginuwine; Alexisonfire; Finger Eleven	
2008	Flo Rida; Simple Plan; illScarlett; Sean Kingston; Kardinal Offishall featuring Akon; JabbaWockeeZ; Girlicious; Rihanna; New Kids on the Block	
2009	Jonas Brothers; Alexisonfire; The Black Eyed Peas; Miley Cyrus; Billy Talent; Kelly Clarkson; Classified; Rise Against; Lady Gaga; Nickelback	
2010	Miley Cyrus; Down With Webster; Adam Lambert; Marianas Trench; Kesha; Hedley; Katy Perry; Drake; Justin Bieber	
2011	Selena Gomez; Lady Gaga; Avril Lavigne; Bruno Mars; City and Colour; The Black Keys; Down with Webster; Simple Plan; DEV; Far East Movement; Fefe Dobson	
2012	LMFAO; Katy Perry; Justin Bieber; Kelly Clarkson; Flo Rida; Hedley; Ed Sheeran; Carly Rae Jepsen; Nelly Furtado; Marianas Trench	
2013	PSY; Demi Lovato; Armin Van Buuren and Trevor Guthrie; Avril Lavigne; Down With Webster; Ed Sheeran; Marianas Trench; Phillip Phillips; Serena Ryder; Classified and David Myles	
2014	Imagine Dragons; Lorde; Ariana Grande; Ed Sheeran; Sam Roberts Band; Virginia to Vegas and Alyssa Reid; Kiesza; MAGIC!; Hedley	
2015	Ed Sheeran; Nick Jonas; Shawn Mendes; Jason Derulo; The Weeknd; Fall Out Boy; Carly Rae Jepsen; Tori Kelly; Scott Helman; Mia Martina and Waka Flocka Flame; Walk Off the Earth	
2016	Macklemore & Ryan Lewis; Alessia Cara; Hailee Steinfeld and Shawn Hook; Hedley; Tegan and Sara; James Bay; Desiigner; Shawn Mendes; July Talk; Nick Jonas; Fifth Harmony	
2017	Camila Cabello; DNCE; Julia Michaels; Arkells; Iggy Azalea; Post Malone; Imagine Dragons; Jazz Cartier; Niall Horan; Lorde	
2018	Shawn Mendes; Meghan Trainor; Halsey; Bülow; Alessia Cara; Bebe Rexha and Brett Kissel; 98 Degrees; Kris Wu; Marshmello featuring Anne-Marie; 5 Seconds of Summer; The Beaches	

=== Presenters ===
Year	Presenters	Reference
1991	Maestro Fresh Wes, Sons of Freedom, Margo Timmins	
1996	Alanis Morissette, Jann Arden, Geddy Lee, Bif Naked, The Philosopher Kings, Kim Stockwood, Roberta Harrison	
1998	Howie Dorough, AJ McLean, Jason Priestley, Anthony Kiedis	
1999	Christina Aguilera, Barenaked Ladies, Christian Campbell Tia Carrere, Choclair, Alice Cooper, Kim Esty, Seth Green, Matthew Good, Geri Halliwell, I Mother Earth, Ed Kowalczyk, Maestro Fresh Wes, Moist, Rascalz, Sloan (band), Paul Stanley, The Boomtang Boys	
2000	Trish Stratus, Val Venis, Aqua, Barenaked Ladies, Ben Harper, b4-4, Bruce Dickinson, Love Inc., Chantal Kreviazuk, Rob Thomas, Adam Gaynor, Steven Seagal, James Marsden, Bif Naked, Kiss, Joey Fatone, JC Chasez, The Boomtang Boys, Bruce Dickinson, Edwin, Haydain Neale, Lochlyn Munro	
2002	Pamela Anderson, Amber Benson, Nicholas Brendon, Jarome Iginla, Kid Rock, Tyler Labine, Amanda Marshall, Mandy Moore, Antonio Sabato Jr., David Usher, Jerome Williams, Nelly Furtado, Korn, Default, Kristin Kreuk, Glenn Lewis, Our Lady Peace, Will Sasso, Sloan, Vince Carter, Anson Carter, Cassie Campbell, Robin Black Bird	
2003	Anson Carter, BrassMunk, Danny Masterson, Gregory Smith, Jamaal Magloire, Mýa, Rachael Leigh Cook, Rascalz, Shane West, Shawn Desman, Kim Poirier, Sum 41, Swollen Members, Treble Charger, Trish Stratus	
2004	Samaire Armstrong, Avril Lavigne, Christina Milian, Kaley Cuoco , Hilary Duff, Vivica A. Fox , Justin Hawkins, Amy Lee, David Gallagher, Default, Joel Madden, Hawksley Workman, Tom Green, In Essence, Keshia Chanté, Kyprios, Nickelback, Our Lady Peace, Pilate, Sam Roberts, Simple Plan, The Trews	
2005	Vivica A. Fox, Carmen Electra, Tie Domi, Rob Mariano, Amber Mariano, Backstreet Boys, Kalan Porter, Yaya DaCosta, Keshia Chanté	
2006	Paris Hilton, Tori Spelling, Sam Roberts, Amanda Bynes, Elisha Cuthbert, Shawn Ashmore, Jesse Metcalfe, Tricia Helfer, Jay Manuel, Evanescence, Mobile, Kardinal Offishall, Theory of a Deadman, Massari, The Trews, T.I.	
2007	Amber Tamblyn, Avril Lavigne, Chris Bosh, Emilie de Ravin, George, Hedley, Hilary Duff, Jay Manuel, Joss Stone, Kardinal Offishall, Marianas Trench, Maroon 5, Ray Emery, Sean Avery, Sam Roberts, Sum 41, Tara Reid	
2008	Bedouin Soundclash, Belly, Brody Jenner, Chace Crawford, City and Colour, Finger Eleven, Jason Spezza, Jesse McCartney, Kal Penn, Kristin Cavallari, Melanie C, Mike Myers, Perez Hilton, Rainn Wilson, Sam Roberts, Sum 41, Theory of a Deadman, The Trews, Whitney Port	
2009	Alexander Ovechkin, Alexisonfire, Audrina Patridge, Billy Talent, The Black Eyed Peas, Brittany Flickinger, Brody Jenner, Chris Bosh, Classified, Danny Fernandes, Divine Brown, Drake, Elise Estrada, Girlicious, Jayde Nicole, Jermaine Dupri, Karl Wolf, Kelly Clarkson, Kim Kardashian, Lights, Marianas Trench, The Midway State, Natalli Reznik, Nicholas "Nico" Archambault, Nickelback, Perez Hilton, Rachelle Lefevre, Reggie Bush, Rise Against, Robin Antin, Rumer Willis, Shiloh, Stereos, Taylor Lautner, Theory of a Deadman	
2010	Adam Lambert, Ashley Greene, Bedouin Soundclash, Blake McGrath, Charlotte Arnold, Cobra Starship, Daren Kagasoff, Emily Osment, Faber Drive, Girlicious, JLS, Jonathan Toews, Karl Wolf, Kellan Lutz, Kristin Cavallari, Leah Miller, Lights, Marianas Trench, Megan Park, Miranda Cosgrove, Nikki Yanofsky, Nina Dobrev, DJ Pauly D, Perez Hilton, Whitney Port, Shailene Woodley, Shenae Grimes, Snooki, Three Days Grace, Xavier Samuel.	
2011	Justin Bieber, Alyssa Reid, Blake McGrath, Cassie Scerbo, Classified, Cody Simpson, Colin Farrell, Danny Fernandes, David Guetta, Foster the People, Johnny Galecki, Karl Wolf, Kat Graham, Ian Somerhalder, Marianas Trench, The Midway State, Munro Chambers, Neverest, Nikki Reed, Nina Dobrev, Shawn Desman, Shay Mitchell, Snoop Dogg, These Kids Wear Crowns, Trevor Donovan	
2012	Conor Maynard, Perez Hilton, Lucy Hale, Darren Criss, Chord Overstreet, Far East Movement, Cody Simpson, Jesse Metcalfe, Down With Webster, Victoria Duffield, Kreesha Turner, Munro Chambers, Shawn Desman, Dragonette, Danny Fernandes, Lights, Anjulie, Shenae Grimes, Rico Rodriguez, These Kids Wear Crowns, Selena Gomez	
2013	Anjulie, Taylor Swift, Austin Mahone, Cody Simpson, Tyler Hoechlin, Luke Bilyk, Billy Talent, Danny Fernandes, The Janoskians, Josh Bowman, Mia Martina, Lucy Hale, Shay Mitchell, Stephen Amell, Kunal Nayyar, Shawn Desman, Brittany Snow, Naya Rivera, Patrick J. Adams	
2014	Chloë Grace Moretz, Jena Malone, Kiernan Shipka, Kellan Lutz, SonReal, Mia Martina, Serena Ryder, Victoria Duffield, The Weeknd, Colton Haynes, Marianas Trench, Nazem Kadri, P.K. Subban, Down With Webster	
2015	Sarah Hyland, Tyler Posey, Gigi Hadid, Bella Thorne, Debby Ryan, Cody Simpson, Echosmith, Nate Ruess, Francesco Yates, Adam Lambert, Shawn Hook, Lights, Arkells, Marianas Trench, Tyler Shaw, Dan Talevski	
2016	Amber Rose, Lilly Singh, SonReal, Hailey Baldwin, Alx Veliz, Sofia Carson, Lucy Hale, Shay Mitchell, Nash Grier, Ashley Benson, Jus Reign, Marianas Trench, Robbie Amell, Scott Helman, Shemar Moore, Tyler Posey, Bethany Mota	
2017	KJ Apa, Nikki Bella, Lilly Singh, Brandon Flynn, Hedley, Shay Mitchell, Bea Miller, Martha Hunt, 4YallEntertainment, Keke Palmer, Shenae Grimes-Beech, Serena Ryder, Jus Reign, Tyler Oakley, Dove Cameron, Tatiana Maslany, Tyler Shaw, Shawn Hook, Scott Helman, Massari, Torrance Coombs, Kat Graham, David Mazouz, Lights, Carly Rae Jepsen	
2018	Tyra Banks, Sonequa Martin-Green, Prince Michael Jackson, Tyler Shaw, Derek Hough, New City, Chrissy Metz, Ashlee Simpson, Evan Ross, The Reklaws, JWoww, Kristin Cavallari, Sofi Tukker, Gus Kenworthy, Madison Beer, Scott Helman, Francesco Yates, Jus Reign, Craig McMorris, Alexandra Shipp, Colton Haynes	

== Awards ==
=== Current ===
- Video of the Year
- Best Director
- Best Post Production
- Best Pop Video
- Best Rock/Alternative Video
- Best Hip Hop Video
- Best EDM/Dance Video
- Best MuchFACT Video
- Best International Artist
- Most Buzzworthy International Artist or Group
- Most Buzzworthy Canadian
- Fan Fave Video
- Your Fave International artist of Group
- Fan Fave International Video
- Fan Fave Much Creator

=== Former ===
- Best Comedy Video
- Best Cinematography
- Best Watched Video

== Most wins ==
Artist with the most awards: Justin Bieber (12), Our Lady Peace (10), and Billy Talent (10)

Justin Bieber:

1. 2010 International Video of the Year By a Canadian, "Baby"
2. 2010 Your Fave: Video, "Baby"
3. 2010 Your Fave: New Artist, "Baby"
4. 2011 International Video of the Year by a Canadian, "Somebody to Love"
5. 2011 Your Fave: Artist, "Somebody to Love"
6. 2012 International Video of the Year by a Canadian, "Boyfriend"
7. 2012 Your Fave: Artist or Group, "Justin Bieber"
8. 2013 Your Fave: Artist or Group, "Justin Bieber"
9. 2014 Your Fave: Artist or Group, "Justin Bieber"
10. 2015 Fan Fave Artist or Group, "Justin Bieber"
11. 2016 Fan Fave Artist or Group, "Justin Bieber"
12. 2017 Fan Fave Artist or Group, "Justin Bieber"

Our Lady Peace:

1. 1997 Your Fave: Group, "Superman's Dead"
2. 1997 Your Fave: Video, "Superman's Dead"
3. 1998 Your Fave: Group, "4 A.M."
4. 2000 Your Fave: Group, "One Man Army"
5. 2000 Your Fave: Video, "One Man Army"
6. 2001 Video of the Year, "In Repair"
7. 2001 Director of the Year, "In Repair"
8. 2001 Post-Productionof the Year, "In Repair"
9. 2003 Video of the Year, "Innocent"
10. 2003 Cinematography of the Year, "Innocent"

Billy Talent:

1. 2004 Best Rock Video, "Try Honesty"
2. 2005 Best Rock Video, "River Below"
3. 2005 Best Video, "River Below"
4. 2007 Best Rock Video, "Fallen Leaves"
5. 2007 Best Video, "Fallen Leaves"
6. 2007 Your Fave: Group, "Devil in a Midnight Mass"
7. 2009 Best International Video by a Canadian, "Rusted from the Rain"
8. 2010 Best Director, Michael Maxxis for "Saint Veronika"
9. 2010 Best Rock Video, "Devil on My Shoulder"
10. 2013 Post-Production Video of the Year, "Surprise, Surprise"

Artist with the most awards won for the same category: Justin Bieber for "Your Fave: Artist or Group"

1. 2011 Your Fave: Artist, "Somebody to Love"
2. 2012 Your Fave: Artist or Group, "Justin Bieber"
3. 2013 Your Fave: Artist or Group, "Justin Bieber"
4. 2014 Your Fave: Artist or Group, "Justin Bieber"
5. 2015 Your Fave: Artist or Group, "Justin Bieber"
6. 2016 Your Fave: Artist or Group, "Justin Bieber"
7. 2017 Your Fave: Artist or Group, "Justin Bieber"
- The "Your Fave: Artist" award has been changed to "Your Fave: Artist or Group".

Artists with the most nominations in one night: Matthew Good Band in 2000 (11)

1. Video of the Year, "Load Me Up" (Winner)
2. Video of the Year, "Strange Days"
3. Rock Video of the Year, "Hello Time Bomb"
4. Rock Video of the Year, "Load Me Up" (Winner)
5. Director of the Year, "Load Me Up"
6. Director of the Year, "Strange Days"
7. Post-Production of the Year, "Load Me Up"
8. Cinematography of the Year, "Load Me Up"
9. Cinematography of the Year, "Strange Days"
10. Your Fave: Group, "Hello Time Bomb"
11. Your Fave: Video, "Hello Time Bomb"

Artists with the most awards in one night:

Drake (5 in 2016)
1. Video of the Year, “Hotline Bling”
2. Hip-Hop Video of the Year, “Hotline Bling”
3. Most Buzzworthy Canadian, “Hotline Bling”
4. Director of the Year, “Hotline Bling”
5. Best MuchFACT Video, "My Love" (with Majid Jordan)

Artists with the most MuchMusic Awards since 2003:

1. Drake (18)
2. Justin Bieber (12)
3. Billy Talent (10)
4. Our Lady Peace (10)
5. Avril Lavigne (8)
6. Hedley (7)
7. Nickelback (6)
8. Nelly Furtado (6)
9. Simple Plan (5)
10. Swollen Members (4)
11. k-os (4)
12. Belly (3)
13. Rihanna (3)
14. Lady Gaga (3)
15. The Midway State (3)
16. Sam Roberts (3)
17. Fifth Harmony (2)
18. Alexisonfire (2)
19. Katy Perry (2)
20. Linkin Park (2)
21. Lorde (2)
22. Shania Twain (2)
23. Treble Charger (2)
24. Kardinal Offishall (2)
25. Fall Out Boy (2)
26. Trey Songz (2)
27. Jonas Brothers (2)
28. Marianas Trench (1)
29. Hilary Duff (1)
30. Demi Lovato (1)
31. Taylor Swift (1)
32. Ariana Grande (1)
33. Selena Gomez (1)

== See also ==
- Music of Canada
