= 2007 MuchMusic Video Awards =

Annual edition of the awards show

- Starring: Leah Miller, Matte Babel, Tim Deegan, Hannah Simone, Devon Soltendieck
- Country of origin: Canada

Production
- Producer: MuchMusic
- Running time: 120 minutes

Original release
- Network: MuchMusic
- Release: June 17, 2007

The 2007 MuchMusic Video Awards were held in Toronto, Ontario at MuchMusic's headquarters on June 17, 2007, and featured performances by Fergie, Maroon 5, The Used, Avril Lavigne, Finger Eleven, Hilary Duff, and others. The most nominated artists were Billy Talent and Nickelback with five nominations each.

== Awards ==
=== Best Video ===
- Billy Talent — "Fallen Leaves"
- Belly f. Ginuwine — "Pressure"
- Finger Eleven — "Paralyzer"
- Nickelback — "If Everyone Cared"
- Three Days Grace — "Never Too Late"

=== Best Director ===
- George — "Lie To Me" (directed by: RT!)
- Belly f. Ginuwine — "Pressure" (directed by: RT!)
- Billy Talent — "Red Flag" (directed by: Floria Sigismondi)
- k-os — "ELEctrik HeaT – the seekwiLL" (directed by: The Love Movement f. k-os, Micah Meisner & Zeb Roc Munir)
- Sam Roberts — "Bridge to Nowhere" (directed by: David Pawsey)

=== Best Post-Production ===
- Sam Roberts — "Bridge to Nowhere" (post-production: Johnathan Legris and David Pawsey)
- Cadence Weapon — "Sharks" (post-production by: Jay Lee, Matt Bilewicz, Ross Birchall)
- In-Flight Safety — "Coast Is Clear" (post-production by: Drew Lightfoot, Tom Morrison, Marc Bachli, Kevin Kim)
- Mobile — "Dusting Down The Stars" (post-production by: Steve Mottershead)
- Hedley — "Gunnin'" (post-production by: Christian Moreton and Marc Bachli)

=== Best Cinematography ===
- Alexisonfire — "This Could Be Anywhere In The World" (Chris Sargent)
- Belly f. Ginuwine — "Pressure" (Adam Marsden)
- Billy Talent — "Red Flag" (Claudio Miranda)
- JDiggz — "Make It Hot" (Simon Shohet)
- Sam Roberts — "Bridge to Nowhere" (François Dutil)

=== Best Pop Video ===
- Hedley — "Gunnin'"
- City and Colour — "Comin' Home"
- George — "Talk To Me"
- k-os — "Sunday Morning"
- Keshia Chanté — "2U"

=== MuchLOUD Best Rock Video ===
- Billy Talent — "Fallen Leaves"
- Alexisonfire — "This Could Be Anywhere In The World"
- Finger Eleven — "Paralyzer"
- Nickelback — "If Everyone Cared"
- Three Days Grace — "Never Too Late"

=== MuchVibe Best Rap Video ===
- Belly f. Ginuwine — "Pressure"
- Classified — "Find Out"
- JDiggz — "Make It Hot"
- k-os — "ELEctrik HeaT – the seekwiLL"
- Point Blank — "Born and Raised in the Ghetto"

=== Best Independent Video ===
- Cancer Bats — "French Immersion"
- Classified — "Find Out"
- In-Flight Safety — "Coast Is Clear"
- Ten Second Epic — "Count Yourself In"
- Tokyo Police Club — '"Cheer It On"

=== MuchMoreMusic Award ===
- Nickelback — "Far Away"
- Feist — "My Moon My Man"
- Michael Bublé — "Everything"
- Nelly Furtado — "Say It Right"
- The Tragically Hip — "In View"

=== Best French Video ===
- Malajube — "Pâte filo"
- Anodajay & Raôul Duguay — "Le Beat A Ti-Bi"
- Damien Robitaille — "Je Tombe"
- Dumas — "Au gré des saisons"
- Vulgaires Machins — "Compter les corps"

=== Best International Video By A Canadian ===
- Avril Lavigne — "Girlfriend"
- Nelly Furtado — "Say It Right"
- Nelly Furtado — "All Good Things (Come To An End)"
- Nickelback — "Far Away"
- Three Days Grace — "Pain"

=== Best International Video - Artist ===
- Fergie — "Fergalicious"
- Akon f. Eminem — "Smack That"
- Beyoncé f. Shakira — "Beautiful Liar"
- Christina Aguilera — "Candyman"
- Eminem f. 50 Cent, Cashis and Lloyd Banks — "You Don't Know"
- Gwen Stefani f. Akon — "The Sweet Escape"
- Hilary Duff — "With Love"
- Justin Timberlake — "What Goes Around...Comes Around"
- Ludacris f. Pharrell — "Money Maker"
- Rihanna f. Jay-Z — "Umbrella"

=== Best International Video - Group ===
- My Chemical Romance — "Welcome To The Black Parade"
- AFI — "Miss Murder"
- Blue October — "Hate Me"
- Evanescence — "Call Me When You're Sober"
- Fall Out Boy — "This Ain't a Scene, It's an Arms Race"
- Pussycat Dolls f. Timbaland — "Wait A Minute"
- Red Hot Chili Peppers — "Dani California"
- The Fray — "How to Save a Life"
- The Killers — "When You Were Young"
- The Used — "The Bird and the Worm"

=== People's Choice: Favourite International Group ===
- My Chemical Romance — "Welcome To The Black Parade"
- Evanescence — "Call Me When You're Sober"
- Pussycat Dolls f. Snoop Dogg — "Buttons"
- Red Hot Chili Peppers — "Dani California"
- The Killers — "When You Were Young"

=== People's Choice: Favourite International Artist ===
- Hilary Duff — "With Love"
- Akon f. Eminem — "Smack That"
- Fergie f. will.i.am — "Fergalicious"
- Gwen Stefani f. Akon — "The Sweet Escape"
- Justin Timberlake — "SexyBack"

=== People's Choice: Favourite Canadian Group ===
- Billy Talent — "Devil In A Midnight Mass"
- Alexisonfire — "This Could Be Anywhere In The World"
- Hedley — "Gunnin"
- Nickelback — "Far Away"
- Three Days Grace — "Pain"

=== People's Choice: Favourite Canadian Artist ===
- Avril Lavigne — "Girlfriend"
- City and Colour — "Comin' Home"
- George — "Talk To Me"
- k-os — "Sunday Morning"
- Nelly Furtado — "Say It Right"

== Performers ==
- Fergie ("Big Girls Don't Cry" and "Fergalicious")
- Alexisonfire ("This Could Be Anywhere In the World")
- Belly f. Ginuwine ("Pressure")
- Finger Eleven ("Paralyzer")
- The Used ("The Bird and the Worm")
- Maroon 5 ("Makes Me Wonder")
- Hilary Duff ("With Love")
- Billy Talent ("Fallen Leaves")
- Avril Lavigne ("Girlfriend")

== Presenters ==
- Maroon 5 - presented Best International Video By A Canadian
- Avril Lavigne - presented MuchMoreMusic Award
- Sean Avery and Ray Emery - introduced Belly and Ginuwine
- Hedley - introduced Finger Eleven
- Hilary Duff - presented MuchLOUD Best Rock Video
- Perez Hilton - introduced People's Choice: Favourite Canadian Group nominees
- Nickelback - presented Best International Video - Artist
- Emilie de Ravin - introduced The Used
- Kardinal Offishall - presented Best Pop Video
- Amber Tamblyn - introduced Hilary Duff
- Chris Bosh - presented MuchVibe Best Rap Video
- Jay Manuel - presented People's Choice: Favourite Canadian Artist
- Joss Stone - introduced Maroon 5
- Marianas Trench - presented People's Choice: Favourite International Group
- Tara Reid - introduced Billy Talent
- George - presented People's Choice: Favourite International Artist
- Sam Roberts - presented People's Choice: Favourite Canadian Group
- Fergie - presented Best Video
- Sum 41 - introduced Avril Lavigne
