= Winston Hauschild =

- Born: September 29, 1973 (age 52); Summerland, British Columbia
- Occupations: Musician, songwriter, producer
- Instruments: Vocals, guitar, bass guitar
- Years active: 1992–present
- Website: winstonhauschild.com

Winston Hauschild is the professional name of Canadian record producer Ryan Hauschild, a songwriter and recording artist based in British Columbia. As of 2018 he operates Little Island Studio on Bowen Island.

== Early life ==
Ryan Hauschild was born in Summerland, British Columbia, on September 29, 1973.

== Career ==
=== Winston ===
Houschild founded an indie pop band called Winston, with guitarist Lanny Hussey, drummer Robbie Watkins and bassist Tony Kerr. After releasing and EP in 2001, the band won CFOX Radio's 2003 Vancouver Seeds band contest, and that year released an album, Passengers. They toured in support of the album in 2004.. Their songs “Nobody Sleeps” and “Rock If You Need It” from the album Passengers was featured on MLB Slugfest: Loaded, released in 2004.

=== Solo career and producing ===
In 2007, by then going by the name Winston, Hauschild signed a recording contract with Aquarius Records and began recording as a solo artist. That year he released an EP, Limited, using vintage analogue equipment.

Hauschild began producing albums for other artists, including Hannah Georgas, Bodhi Jones and Wanting Qu, whose album Everything in the World has been certified triple platinum in China and Hong Kong. Hauschild also served on the Board of Directors for the non-profit British Columbia industry association Music BC.

In 2013 Hauschilde released an album of his own compositions, Beginning of the Long Dash. That year he helped to produce a compilation album as part of Vancouver radio station 102.7FM's annual PEAK Performance Project battle of the bands contest.

By 2014 he was living on Bowen Island, while continuing his production work at Fader Master Studios in Vancouver. By 2016 he was operating his own studio on Bowen Island.

Hauschild sometimes contributes musically to the albums he produces; for example, he added keyboard sounds to the Chicken-Like Birds' 2017 album Moving ON.

== Discography ==
Year	Album
2001	My Fix EP (with the Winston band)
2003	Passengers (with the Winston band)
2006	Lost on Me (unreleased)
2007	Limited EP (solo)
2013	The Beginning of the Long Dash (solo)

== Production credits ==
- Crystal McGrath – I (2006)
- Anthill – Waiting for the Sun (2006)
- Greg Keating – Grounded (2006)
- Winston Hauschild – Limited (2007)
- Jake Jasmine – Jake Jasmine EP (2007)
- Lish – Love Is Soul Healing (2007)
- Hannah Georgas – The Beat Stuff (Hidden Pony Records) (2008)
- Nat Jay – Lights Across The Sky (2008)
- The Savannah Leigh Band – City of Grey (2008)
- City of Glass – Equations (2009)
- Wanting – Love I Am (2009)
- David Blair – Things Left Unsaid (2008)
- Bodhi Jones – Where Does The Time Go? (2010)
- Nadia von Hahn – Wait And See What Happens (2010)
- Dan Kosub – Jacob's Island (2011)
- Shera Kelly – A Bicycle Commuters Anthem (2011)
- Mike Edel – The Last of Our Mountains (2011)
- Hawk Bjorn – Life Insurance (2011)
- Shalini Kumar – Book of Dreams (2011)
- Marc Alexandre – Marc Alexandre (2011)
- Stephanie Chatman – Compass Rose (2012)
- Sillken – TBA (2012)
- David Blair – TBA (2012)
- City of Glass – The Diving Bell EP (2012)
- Jodi Doidge – Little Love Songs (2012)
- Wanting – Everything in the World (Nettwerk Records) (2012)
- Annie Nolan – TBA (2012)
- Jason Thompson – TBA (2013)
- Bodhi Jones – Bones 2013)
- T. Riley – Eat Your Heart Out! (2013)
- Rachael Schroeder – Warrior Paint (2013)
- Elaine Ryan – Sunsets and Twilights (2013)
- Nat Jay – All I Think When I Wake UP (2014)
- Jen Hershman - "TBA" (2014)
- Ben Everyman - "Subourbon" (2014)
- Ashleigh Somerville - "Wild Cherry Girl" (2014)
- Katherine Penfold - "K" (2014)
- Alyssa Baker - "Alyssa Baker" (2014)
- Ken Stead - Fear Has No Place Here (2015)
- Nat Jay - Quiet Dreams (2015)
- Hollow Twin - "Keepers" (2015)
- Gigaheartz - "TBA" (2015)
- Patrick Jacobson - "TBA" (2015)
