= We Are the Same =

Studio album by The Tragically Hip
- Released: April 7, 2009
- Recorded: August–October 2008
- Studios: The Bathouse (Bath, Ontario); The Warehouse (Vancouver); The Orange Lounge (Toronto)
- Genre: Alternative rock
- Length: 57:21
- Label: Universal
- Producer: Bob Rock

The Tragically Hip chronology
World Container (2006)	We Are the Same (2009)	Now for Plan A (2012)

Singles from We Are the Same
- 1. "Love Is a First" Released: 2009; 2. "Morning Moon" Released: 2009; 3. "Speed River" Released: 2009

Professional ratings
Review scores
Source	Rating
Allmusic	3/5 stars
The Buffalo News	(favourable)
Jam!	3/5 stars
The Toronto Star	3/4 stars
The Vancouver Sun	3/5 stars

We Are the Same is the 11th studio album by Canadian rock band The Tragically Hip, released April 7, 2009 on Universal Music Canada, and by Zoë Records in the United States. The album was recorded at The Bathouse Recording Studio in Bath, Ontario with producer Bob Rock.

The opening track, "Morning Moon", was released on the band's website in advance of the album's release. The first single, "Love Is a First", was released February 27, 2009 and peaked at #22 on the Canadian Hot 100.

On April 6, 2009, to coincide with the release of We Are the Same, The Tragically Hip performed at The Bathouse Recording Studio in a concert that was screened live in Cineplex theatres across Canada.

== Commercial performance ==
The album sold just under 27,000 copies in its first week and debuted at #1 on the Canadian Albums Chart, making it the band's eighth #1 on the chart. In the U.S. it peaked at #148 on the Billboard 200. The album reached platinum certification in Canada the year it was released.

== Track listing ==
All lyrics are written by Gord Downie; all music is composed by The Tragically Hip.

No.	Title	Length
1.	"Morning Moon"	4:01
2.	"Honey, Please"	4:00
3.	"The Last Recluse"	3:49
4.	"Coffee Girl"	3:46
5.	"Now the Struggle Has a Name"	6:04
6.	"The Depression Suite"	9:27
7.	"The Exact Feeling"	3:55
8.	"Queen of the Furrows"	4:12
9.	"Speed River"	4:28
10.	"Frozen in My Tracks"	4:04
11.	"Love Is a First"	3:43
12.	"Country Day"	5:18
Total length:		57:21

iTunes and Telus pre-order bonus tracks
No.	Title	Length
13.	"Hush"	2:29
14.	"Skeleton Park"	3:47
Total length:		63:37

Note

- "The Depression Suite" is subdivided into three different parts: "The Rock", "NewOrleansWorld", and "Don't You Wanna See How It Ends?"

== Personnel ==
Personnel taken from We Are the Same liner notes, except where noted.

The Tragically Hip

- Rob Baker
- Gord Downie
- Johnny Fay
- Paul Langlois
- Gord Sinclair

Additional musicians

- Kevin Hearn – piano, accordion
- John Webster – Hammond B3 organ
- Derry Byrne – trumpet
- Bob Buckley – string arrangements, strings
- Mary Brown, Karen Foster, Ruth Schipizky, Angela Cavadas, Jennie Press, Cameron Wilson, Deanne Eisch, Calvin Dyck, Zi Zhou, Andrew Brown, Reginald Quiring, Stephen Wilkes, Ari Barnes, Zoltan Rozsnyai, Joseph Elworthy – strings
- Bob Rock – background vocals
- Eric Helmkamp – background vocals

Technical personnel

- Bob Rock – production
- Eric Helmkamp – recording
- Aaron Holmberg – recording assistance (Bathouse)
- Jason "Metal" Donkersgoed – recording assistance (The Orange Lounge)
- Michael Gillies – additional engineering (Bathouse)
- Roger Monk – additional engineering (The Warehouse)
- Jens – mixing
- George Marino – mastering
- Garnet Armstrong – art direction, design
- Simon Paul – art direction, design
- Clemens Rikken – photography

== Charts ==
=== Weekly charts ===
Chart (2009)	Peak position
Canadian Albums (Billboard)	1
US Billboard 200	148

=== Year-end charts ===
Chart (2009)	Position
Canadian Albums (Billboard)	38

== Certifications ==
Region	Certification	Certified units/sales
Canada (Music Canada)	Platinum	80,000^{^}
^{^} Shipments figures based on certification alone.
