= Hannah Georgas (album) =

Studio album by Hannah Georgas
- Released: October 12, 2012
- Genre: Pop
- Length: 35:00
- Label: Dine Alone Records
- Producer: Graham Walsh

Hannah Georgas chronology
This Is Good (2010)	Hannah Georgas (2012)

Hannah Georgas is the second studio album by Vancouver-based artist Hannah Georgas. Produced by Graham Walsh of the Canadian electronic band Holy Fuck, it was released by Dine Alone Records on October 2, 2012.

The album won "Pop Recording of the Year" at the Western Canadian Music Awards in 2013. It was nominated for Alternative Album of the Year at the 2013 Juno Awards, and was included on the 2013 Polaris Music Prize longlist.

The song "Millions" was featured in the closing of the Girls episode "Free Snacks" on February 9, 2014.

== Track listing ==
All songs written by Hannah Georgas except where noted

Track No.	Track title	Writer(s)	Track length
1	Elephant		3:38
2	Somebody		3:24
3	Robotic	Hannah Georgas, Ryan Guldemond	3:57
4	Enemies		4:08
5	Shortie		3:17
6	Fantasize		2:36
7	Millions		3:15
8	What You Do to Me	Hannah Georgas, Charles F.	3:21
9	Ode to Mom		3:04
10	Waiting Game		4:03

== Personnel ==
- Hannah Georgas - vocals, piano
- Graham Walsh - minimoog, OP-1, drum programming, bass, guitar, six-track
- Loel Campbell - drums
- Joel Stouffer - drums
- Tim D'Eon - guitar, piano
- Dean Drouillard - guitar
- Ryan Guldemond - vocals, synth, guitar
- Shadrach Kabango - Vocals on "Waiting Game"
- Charles F. - guitar
