= This Suffering =

Single by Billy Talent

from the album Billy Talent II and 666
- Released: November 26, 2007
- Genre: Alternative rock, emo
- Length: 3:57
- Label: Atlantic
- Songwriter: Billy Talent
- Producer: Gavin Brown

Billy Talent singles chronology
| "Surrender" (2007) | "This Suffering" (2007) | "Turn Your Back" (2008) |

"This Suffering" is a song by Canadian alternative rock group Billy Talent. It was released in November 2007 as the fifth and final single from their second studio album, Billy Talent II.

== Music video ==
The music video is a live performance video from clips of their DVD 666. It first appeared on the MuchMusic Countdown on November 29, 2007, at the number 30 spot, and peaked at the number 5 spot.

== Chart performance ==
| Chart (2007–08) | Peak position |
|---|---|
| Canada Hot 100 (Billboard) | 93 |
| Canada Rock Top 30 (Radio & Records) | 27 |

== Certifications ==
| Region | Certification | Certified units/sales |
|---|---|---|
| Canada (Music Canada) | Platinum | 80,000^{‡} |
^{‡} Sales+streaming figures based on certification alone.
