= This Is Good =

Studio album by Hannah Georgas
- Released: April 27, 2010
- Genre: Pop, rock
- Length: 34:31
- Label: Hidden Pony Records
- Producer: Howard Redekopp and Ryan Guldemond

Hannah Georgas chronology
The Beat Stuff (2009)	This Is Good (2010)	Hannah Georgas (2012)

This Is Good is the debut album by Canadian pop/rock singer-songwriter Hannah Georgas. It was released April 27, 2010 by Hidden Pony Records.

The album was a longlisted nominee for the 2010 Polaris Music Prize.

== Track listing ==
All songs by Hannah Georgas except where noted.

Track no.	Track title	Writer(s)	Track length
1	Chit Chat		3:12
2	Lovesick		3:14
3	Dancefloor		2:24
4	The Deep End	Hannah Georgas, Robbie Driscoll	3:04
5	Lovers Breakdown		3:26
6	Thick Skin		2:20
7	This is Good		3:57
8	Bang Bang You're Dead	Hannah Georgas, Charles F., José Miguel Contreras	2:53
9	Your Ghost		4:07
10	Shine	Hannah Georgas, Brandon Chandler, Josh Schroeder	3:17
11	Something For You	Georgas, Driscoll	2:34

== Personnel ==
- Hannah Georgas – vocals, keyboards, synthesizer
- Ryan Guldemond – guitar, string arrangements, keyboards, synthesizer, upright bass, vocals
- Aaron Joyce – guitar
- Robbie Driscoll – electric bass, banjo, ukulele, upright bass
- Niko Friesen – drums
- Andrea Stradze – violin
- Peggy Lee – cello
- Jeremy Page – clarinet
- Jonathan Sykes – trumpet
- Jeremy Holmes – upright bass
- Howard Redekopp – vocals

=== Production ===
- Howard Redekopp – record producer, engineer, mixer
