= The Ex (song) =

Single by Billy Talent

from the album Billy Talent
- Released: December 23, 2003
- Genre: Post-hardcore, pop punk
- Length: 2:40
- Label: Atlantic
- Songwriter: Billy Talent
- Producer: Gavin Brown

Billy Talent singles chronology
"Try Honesty" (2003)	"The Ex" (2003)	"River Below" (2004)

Music video
- "The Ex" on YouTube

"The Ex" is a song by Canadian alternative rock band, Billy Talent, released December 23, 2003 which served as the second single off their debut self-titled album via Atlantic Records.

== Music video ==
The video for "The Ex," directed and edited by filmmaker and former musician, Shawn Maher in collaboration with the band themselves, was released January 2004. Composed entirely of live performance footage, the video captures the raw and frenzied atmosphere of a Billy Talent concert, showcasing the group playing the track on stage to an energized audience of their fans.

The primary scenes of the video were filmed at The Capital Music Hall in Ottawa, Ontario, while the wide crowd shots and additional performance angles, utilizes footage from the band's 2003 appearance on MTV2 live music TV series, "Pepsi Breakout" at Macewan Hall in Calgary, Alberta.

== Track listing ==
CD Single
No.	Title	Length
1.	"The Ex"	2:40
2.	"Waiting Room (Fugazi cover)" (Live)	2:52
Total length:		5:32

UK 7" Single
No.	Title	Length
1.	"The Ex"	2:40
2.	"Try Honesty" (Acoustic)	4:20
Total length:		7:00

== Chart performance ==
Chart (2004)	Peak position
UK Singles (Official Charts)	61
UK Rock & Metal (Official Charts)	3

== Certifications ==
Region	Certification	Certified units/sales
Canada (Music Canada)	Gold	40,000^{‡}
^{‡} Sales+streaming figures based on certification alone.
