= Now for Plan A =

Studio album by The Tragically Hip
- Released: October 2, 2012
- Studios: Noble Street, Toronto, Ontario; The Bathouse, Bath, Ontario
- Genres: Rock, alternative rock
- Length: 39:18
- Label: Universal
- Producer: Gavin Brown

The Tragically Hip chronology
We Are the Same (2009)	Now for Plan A (2012)	Man Machine Poem (2016)

Singles from Now for Plan A
- 1. "At Transformation" Released: May 18, 2012; 2. "Streets Ahead" Released: August 24, 2012

Now for Plan A is the 12th studio album by Canadian rock band, The Tragically Hip. At a length of 39:18, it is the band's shortest album. The album's first single, "At Transformation", was released on May 18, 2012. The album's second single, "Streets Ahead", was released to radio on August 24. On September 25, the band made the album available to stream online in its entirety via SoundCloud. The album was nominated for Rock Album of the Year at the 2013 Juno Awards.

Professional ratings
Review scores
Source	Rating
Allmusic	3.5/5 stars
Toronto Star	3/4 stars
Calgary Herald	3/5 stars

== Commercial performance ==
Now For Plan A debuted at #3 on the Canadian Albums Chart. It was the band's first album since their 1991 release Road Apples to debut lower than the number two position on the chart. The album sold 12,000 copies in its first week, less than half of the first week sales of the band's two previous albums, 2009's We Are the Same and 2006's World Container. In the United States, the album debuted at #129 on the Billboard 200, the band's highest position on that chart in their history. The album was certified gold in Canada on January 14, 2013.

== Track listing ==
All lyrics are written by Gordon Downie; all music is composed by The Tragically Hip.

No.	Title	Length
1.	"At Transformation"	3:44
2.	"Man Machine Poem"	3:52
3.	"The Lookahead"	2:26
4.	"We Want to Be It"	3:28
5.	"Streets Ahead"	3:26
6.	"Now for Plan A"	5:07
7.	"The Modern Spirit"	3:21
8.	"About This Map"	3:47
9.	"Take Forever"	3:10
10.	"Done and Done"	2:53
11.	"Goodnight Attawapiskat"	4:04

== Personnel ==
The Tragically Hip

- Gord Downie – lead vocals
- Rob Baker – lead guitar
- Paul Langlois – rhythm guitar, backing vocals
- Gord Sinclair – bass, backing vocals
- Johnny Fay – drums

Additional personnel

- Gavin Brown – production
- Sarah Harmer – backing vocals ("The Lookahead" and "Now for Plan A")

== Charts ==
Chart (2012)	Peak position
Canadian Albums Chart	3
U.S. Billboard 200	129
U.S. Billboard Rock Albums	44
U.S. Billboard Heatseekers Albums	3
