= The Beat Stuff =

EP by Hannah Georgas
- Released: January 9, 2009
- Genre: Pop
- Length: 28:00
- Label: Hidden Pony Records
- Producer: Winston Hauschild

Hannah Georgas chronology
The Beat Stuff (2009)	This Is Good (2010)

The Beat Stuff is the debut six track EP by Canadian singer-songwriter Hannah Georgas. Originally released independently in 2008 as a five-song release, the EP was later picked up by Hidden Pony Records (with distribution through EMI Canada), which released a new edition in early 2009 with the extra track "Gabriella".

The EP garnered radio airplay for the singles "The Beat Stuff" and "The National".

Starbucks licensed "The Beat Stuff" for play in its cafés. During her tour to support the EP, a commercial music supervisor also saw her performance in New York City, and licensed her new non-album track, "You've Got a Place Called Home", for use in a Wal-Mart commercial.

Georgas won CBC Radio 3's Bucky Award for Best New Artist in 2009.

== Track listing ==
All songs written by Hannah Georgas.

Track No.	Track title
1	Let's Talk
2	The Beat Stuff
3	Mama's Boy
4	The National
5	All I Need
6	Gabriella

== Credits ==
Musicians:

- Hannah Georgas - Vocals, Acoustic Guitar, Keys, Glockenspiel
- Robbie Driscoll - Bass, Banjo, Glockenspiel
- Winston Hauschild - Guitars, Ukulele, Percussion
- Niko Friesen - Drums, Percussion
- Joe Cruz - Guitars on "All I Need" and "The National"

Production:

- Recorded by Shawn Cole and Winston Hauschild
- Mixed by Dr. Boss
- Mastered by Joao Carvalho
