= 2005 MuchMusic Video Awards =

Edition of Canadian annual award show

- Starring: Leah Miller, Matte Babel, Devon Soltendieck, Sarah Taylor, Rick Campanelli
- Country of origin: Canada

Production
- Producer: MuchMusic
- Running time: 2 hours

Original release
- Network: MuchMusic
- Release: June 19, 2005

The 2005 MuchMusic Video Awards were held on June 19, 2005 and featured performances by k-os, Alexisonfire, Billy Talent, Arcade Fire, Ciara and others. The most nominated artist was Billy Talent with 9 nominations.

== Best Video ==
- Billy Talent — "River Below"
- Billy Talent — "Nothing to Lose"
- k-os — "Crabbuckit"
- k-os — "Man I Used to Be"
- Simple Plan — "Untitled (How Could This Happen to Me)"

== Best Director ==
- k.os — "Man I Used to Be" (directed by: The Love Movement f. Micah J. Meisner & k.os)
- Billy Talent — "Nothing to Lose"
- Billy Talent — "River Below"
- k.os — "Crabbuckit"
- Shawn Desman - "Let's Go"

== Best Post-Production ==
- Death From Above 1979 — "Romantic Rights"
- Billy Talent — "River Below"
- Jakalope — "Feel It"
- Pilate — "Overrated"
- The Tea Party — "Writing's On The Wall"

== Best Cinematography ==
- k.os — "Man I Used to Be"
- Billy Talent — "Nothing to Lose"
- Jakalope — "Feel It"
- Kalan Porter — "Single"
- Pilate — "Overrated"

== Best Pop Video ==
- k.os — "Crabbuckit"
- Kalan Porter — "Single"
- Keshia Chanté — "Does He Love Me"
- Shawn Desman — "Let's Go"
- Simple Plan — "Untitled (How Could This Happen to Me)"

== MuchLOUD Best Rock Video ==
- Billy Talent — "River Below"
- Alexisonfire — "Accidents"
- Billy Talent — "Nothing to Lose"
- Death From Above 1979 — "Romantic Rights"
- Jakalope — "Feel It"

== MuchVibe Best Rap Video ==
- k.os — "Man I Used to Be"
- Choclair f. Saukrates, Ro Dolla & Solitair — "Tell 'Em"
- Masia One — "Split Second Time"
- Massari f. Loon — "Smile for Me"
- Rochester a.k.a. Juice f. Kolor Brown — "A New Day"

== Best Independent Video ==
- Alexisonfire — "Accidents"
- Death From Above 1979 — "Romantic Rights"
- Jakalope — "Feel It"
- Massari f. Loon — "Smile for Me"
- Arcade Fire — "Rebellion (Lies)"

== MuchMoreMusic Award ==
- Shania Twain — "Party for Two"
- Celine Dion — "You and I"
- Feist — "Inside and Out"
- Michael Bublé — "Home"
- Sarah McLachlan — "World On Fire"

== Best French Video ==
- Ariane Moffatt — "Fracture du crâne"
- Corneille — "Seul au monde"
- Les Trois Accords — "Saskatchewan"
- Loco Locass — "Groove Grave"
- Marie-Mai — "Il faut que tu t'en ailles"

== Best International Video – Artist ==
- Usher — "Caught Up"
- 50 Cent f. Olivia — "Candy Shop"
- Ciara f. Missy Elliott — "1, 2 Step"
- Eminem — "Just Lose It"
- Eric Prydz — "Call on Me"
- Gwen Stefani — "What You Waiting For?"
- Kanye West — "Jesus Walks"
- Nas f. Olu Dara — "Bridging the Gap"
- Snoop Dogg f. Pharrell — "Drop It Like It's Hot"
- The Game f. 50 Cent — "Hate It or Love It"

== Best International Video - Group ==
- The Killers — "Mr. Brightside"
- The Black Eyed Peas — "Let's Get It Started"
- Destiny's Child — "Lose My Breath"
- Green Day — "American Idiot"
- Green Day — "Boulevard of Broken Dreams"
- Jet — "Look What You've Done"
- My Chemical Romance — "Helena"
- The Bravery — "An Honest Mistake"
- The Used — "All That I've Got"
- U2 — "Vertigo"

== People's Choice: Favourite International Group ==
- Green Day — "Boulevard of Broken Dreams"
- Black Eyed Peas — "Let's Get It Started"
- Maroon 5 — "She Will Be Loved"
- The Killers — "Mr. Brightside"
- U2 — "Vertigo"

== People's Choice: Favourite International Artist ==
- Gwen Stefani f. Eve — "Rich Girl"
- 50 Cent f. Olivia — "Candy Shop"
- Eminem — "Just Lose It"
- The Game — "How We Do"
- Usher — "Caught Up"

== People's Choice: Favourite Canadian Group ==
- Simple Plan — Welcome to My Life
- Alexisonfire — "Accidents"
- Billy Talent — "River Below"
- Sum 41 — "Pieces"
- Theory of a Deadman — "No Surprise"

== People's Choice: Favourite Canadian Artist ==
- Kalan Porter — "Single"
- Avril Lavigne — "My Happy Ending"
- Keshia Chanté — "Does He Love Me"
- k.os — "Crabbuckit"
- Shawn Desman — "Let's Go"

== Performers ==
- The Killers
- Ashlee Simpson
- k-os
- Alexisonfire
- Black Eyed Peas
- Arcade Fire
- Ciara
- Billy Talent
