= Billy Talent II =

Studio album by Billy Talent
- Released: June 27, 2006
- Recorded: 2005–2006
- Studio: The Warehouse (Vancouver); The Armoury (Vancouver); Vespa Music (Toronto); A Room Full Of Stuff (Toronto)
- Genre: Alternative rock; pop-punk; post-hardcore
- Length: 47:00
- Label: Atlantic
- Producer: Gavin "Golden" Brown; Ian D'Sa

Billy Talent chronology
Billy Talent (2003)	Billy Talent II (2006)	Live from the UK Sept./2006 (2006)

Singles from Billy Talent II
- 1. "Devil in a Midnight Mass" Released: June 15, 2006; 2. "Red Flag" Released: September 11, 2006; 3. "Fallen Leaves" Released: November 19, 2006; 4. "Surrender" Released: April 2, 2007; 5. "This Suffering" Released: November 26, 2007

Professional ratings
Review scores
Source	Rating
AbsolutePunk	(89%)
AllMusic	3.5/5 stars
IGN	(7.9/10)
Jam!	3.5/5 stars
Sputnikmusic	4/5 stars

Billy Talent II is the second studio album by Canadian rock band Billy Talent, released on June 27, 2006. The album debuted at No. 1 on the Canadian Albums Chart, selling 48,000 copies in its first week. The album also reached No. 1 on the German albums chart. Despite its great success in Canada and Germany, the album was not as successful in the United States, where it peaked at No. 134 on the Billboard 200 music chart, selling just 7,231 units in its first week.

== Themes ==
The album has less anger and language than their previous self-titled album, as they had mellowed out and matured as men and as a band. More of the songs dealt with real-life issues, to the praise of fans and critics.

"We wanted to do something completely different from the first record because we had changed dramatically and had learned a lot from personal relationships. Everyone in the band is partnering up and dealing with those issues. The general theme of this record is trust, the lack thereof or breaking up. That seemed to fuel the record."

— Jonathan Gallant speaking with the Ottawa Sun

== Release ==
The band temporarily released the entire album to their MySpace page for June 23.

Beginning in the fall of 2005, songs from the new album were purposely leaked by the band. A demo of "Red Flag" circulated across the internet, even though it had already appeared on the soundtracks to Burnout Revenge, Burnout Legends, SSX on Tour, NHL 06 and on the Atlantic Records compilation Black by Popular Demand.

"Devil in a Midnight Mass" was the first single. A demo of the song was released on MySpace and Purevolume on Christmas Day (December 25) 2005, and the official single was released on April 20, 2006. "Red Flag" was released as the second single. A video for it was shot on July 21, 2006, in Los Angeles.

The day after its debut, the band performed an Intimate & Interactive outdoor concert on MuchMusic in the CHUM-City Building parking lot in Toronto, Ontario. They were also interviewed by Much VJ Devon Soltendieck, and asked questions from viewers via telephone, e-mail, and videophone.

"Surrender" was offered for download exclusively on Valentine's Day, 2006; it also appears on this album. According to a MuchMusic interview with the band, Surrender is supposed to be a love song. Radio recordings of that song, as well as "Covered in Cowardice", "This Suffering", and a low quality version of "Worker Bees" became available several weeks before the album's release.

The music video for their third single, "Fallen Leaves", was shot on the first two days of November 2006, in Los Angeles. It was first played in Canada on Much on Demand on November 27, 2006, and worldwide the following week.

The band performed a live session for Mike Davies on BBC Radio 1's The Lockup on September 12, playing the tracks "Red Flag", "Devil in a Midnight Mass" and "This Suffering".

On November 22, the band made its American premiere on the Late Night with Conan O'Brien show, performing "Red Flag".

On January 12, 2007, the music video for "Fallen Leaves" was made available to watch in the UK on the rock channels Kerrang!, Scuzz and MTV2.

In February 2007, the video for "Surrender" was shot and debuted in Germany on April 2, 2007.

In April 2007, the album won a Juno Award for best rock album of the year.

Although never released as a single, the band shot a music video for "The Navy Song", released exclusively through the band's Myspace, during summer 2007.

On November 26, 2007, the video for "This Suffering" was released. It was released mainly to promote the band's new live DVD 666 Live; its music video consisted of clips from the 666 performances.

== Track listing ==
All tracks are written by Billy Talent.

Standard edition
No.	Title	Length
1.	"Devil in a Midnight Mass"	2:52
2.	"Red Flag"	3:16
3.	"This Suffering"	3:57
4.	"Worker Bees"	3:44
5.	"Pins and Needles"	3:11
6.	"Fallen Leaves"	3:19
7.	"Where Is the Line?"	3:49
8.	"Covered in Cowardice"	4:12
9.	"Surrender"	4:06
10.	"The Navy Song"	4:31
11.	"Perfect World"	3:06
12.	"Sympathy"	3:18
13.	"Burn the Evidence"	3:40
Total length:		47:07

Japanese edition bonus tracks
No.	Title	Length
14.	"Ever Fallen in Love (With Someone You Shouldn't've?)" (Buzzcocks cover)	2:41
15.	"Devil in a Midnight Mass" (Demo Version)	3:19
Total length:		53:12

Best Buy American exclusive bonus CD
No.	Title	Length
14.	"Beach Balls"	3:48
15.	"When I Was a Little Girl"	2:10
Total length:		53:05

iTunes exclusive
No.	Title	Length
14.	"Red Flag" (Live at the Horseshoe Tavern)	3:42
Total length:		50:51

iTunes exclusive
No.	Title	Length
14.	"Fallen Leaves" (Live at the Horseshoe Tavern)	3:19
Total length:		50:20

== Personnel ==
Billy Talent

- Ben Kowalewicz – lead vocals
- Ian D'Sa – guitar, vocals
- Jon Gallant – bass, vocals
- Aaron Solowoniuk – drums

Additional musicians

- Gavin Brown – tambourine on "Worker Bees"

Artwork

- Liz Barrett – art producer
- Kim Kinakin & Henry Fong – artwork
- Kim Kinakin – package design
- Henry Fong – cover illustration
- Ian D'Sa – art direction
- Dustin Rabin – photography

Production

- Gavin Brown – producer
- Ian D'Sa – producer
- Eric Ratz – engineer
- Brian Gallant – assistant engineer (The Warehouse)
- Rob Stefanson – assistant engineer (The Armoury)
- Chris Lord-Alge – mixing
- Keith Armstrong – assistant mix engineer
- Brian Gardner – mastering
- Kenny Luong – Pro Tools and digital editing

== Charts ==
Chart	Position
Austrian Albums (Ö3 Austria)	4
Belgian Albums (Ultratop Flanders)	80
Canadian Albums (Billboard)	1
Finnish Albums (Suomen virallinen lista)	22
German Albums (Offizielle Top 100)	1
Scottish Albums (OCC)	57
Swiss Albums (Schweizer Hitparade)	31
UK Albums (OCC)	46
US Billboard 200	134
US Heatseekers Albums (Billboard)	3

=== Year-end charts ===
End of year chart (2007)	Position
German Albums Chart	37

== Certifications ==
Region	Certification	Certified units/sales
Austria (IFPI Austria)	Platinum	30,000^{*}
Canada (Music Canada)	4× Platinum	400,000^{‡}
Germany (BVMI)	2× Platinum	400,000^{^}
United Kingdom (BPI)	Silver	60,000^{^}
^{*} Sales figures based on certification alone.^{^} Shipments figures based on certification alone.^{‡} Sales+streaming figures based on certification alone.
