= 2004 MuchMusic Video Awards =

- Starring: George Stroumboulopoulos, Amanda Walsh, Devon Soltendieck, Sarah Taylor, Rick Campanelli
- Country of origin: Canada

Production
- Producer: MuchMusic
- Running time: 2 hours

Original release
- Network: MuchMusic
- Release: June 19, 2004

The 2004 MuchMusic Video Awards were held on June 19, 2004, and featured performances by the Beastie Boys, Evanescence, Billy Talent, Hilary Duff, Kanye West and others. The most nominated artist was Sam Roberts with 8 nominations.

== Best Video ==
- Finger Eleven — "One Thing"
- Billy Talent — "Try Honesty"
- Nelly Furtado — "Powerless (Say What You Want)"
- Pilate — "Into Your Hideout"
- Sam Roberts — "Hard Road"

== Best Director ==
- Sam Roberts — "Hard Road" (directed by: Kyle Davison)
- Billy Talent — "Try Honesty" (directed by: Sean Michael Turrell)
- Default — "Throw It All Away" (directed by: Andrew McNaughton)
- k-os — "Heaven Only Knows" (directed by: Don Allan)
- Pilate - "Into Your Hideout" (directed by: Maxime Giroux)

== Best Post-Production ==
- Sam Roberts — "Hard Road"
- Billy Talent — "Try Honesty"
- Pilate — "Into Your Hideout"
- Sam Roberts — "Where Have All The Good People Gone"
- Universal Soul — "Way Back In The Day"

== Best cinematography ==
- Sam Roberts — "Hard Road"
- Billy Talent — "Try Honesty"
- Default — "Throw It All Away"
- Jelleestone f. Elephant Man — "Who Dat"
- Pilate — "Melt Into The Walls"

== Best Pop Video ==
- Nelly Furtado — "Powerless (Say What You Want)"
- Fefe Dobson — "Take Me Away"
- Hawksley Workman — "Anger as Beauty"
- Lillix — "Tomorrow"
- Sam Roberts — "Hard Road"

== MuchLOUD Best Rock Video ==
- Billy Talent — "Try Honesty"
- Finger Eleven — "Good Times"
- Finger Eleven — "One Thing"
- Nickelback — "Someday"
- Three Days Grace — "I Hate (Everything About You)"

== MuchVibe Best Rap Video ==
- Jelleestone f. Elephant Man — "Who Dat"
- Choclair — "Skyline"
- k-os — "Heaven Only Knows"
- Tone Mason f. Brassmunk, G. Stokes, Graph Nobel — "The Throwback"
- Universal Soul — "Way Back In The Day"

== Best R&B Video ==
- In Essence — "Friend Of Mine"
- Big Black Lincoln — "Pimpin' Life"
- Keshia Chanté — "Unpredictable"
- Melanie Durrant f. Common — "Where I'm Going"
- Ray Robinson — "Missed Your Chance"

== Best Independent Video ==
- Pilate — "Into Your Hideout"
- Alexisonfire — "Counterparts and Number Them"
- Sweatshop Union — "The Thing About It"
- The Trews — "Not Ready to Go"
- Tone Mason f. Brassmunk, G. Stokes, Graph Nobel — "The Throwback"

== MuchMoreMusic Award ==
- Sarah McLachlan — "Fallen"
- Hawksley Workman — "We Will Still Need A Song"
- Nelly Furtado — "Powerless (Say What You Want)"
- Sam Roberts — "Hard Road"
- Shania Twain — "Forever and for Always"

== Best French Video ==
- Corneille — "Parce qu'on vient de loin"
- Ariane Moffatt — "Poussière d'ange"
- Daniel Boucher — "Le vent soufflait mes pellicules"
- Stefie Shock — "L'amour dans le désert"
- Vulgaires Machins — "Anesthésie"

== Best International Video – Artist ==
- Beyoncé Knowles f. Jay-Z — "Crazy in Love"
- 50 Cent — "P.I.M.P"
- Britney Spears — "Toxic"
- Chingy — "Right Thurr"
- Christina Aguilera — "The Voice Within"
- Hilary Duff — "Come Clean"
- Kanye West f. Syleena Johnson — "All Falls Down"
- Ludacris f. Shawnna — "Stand Up"
- Missy Elliott — "Pass That Dutch"
- Usher f. Ludacris & Lil' Jon — "Yeah!"

== Best International Video - Group ==
- Outkast — "Hey Ya!"
- Beastie Boys — "Ch-Check It Out"
- The Black Eyed Peas — "Where Is the Love?"
- Evanescence — "My Immortal"
- Good Charlotte — "Hold On"
- Hoobastank — "The Reason"
- Incubus — "Megalomaniac"
- Jet — "Are You Gonna Be My Girl"
- Steriogram — "Walkie Talkie Man"
- The Darkness — "I Believe in a Thing Called Love"

== People's Choice: Favourite International Group ==
- Linkin Park — "Numb"
- Black Eyed Peas — "Where Is the Love?"
- Evanescence — "My Immortal"
- Good Charlotte — "Girls & Boys"
- Outkast — "Hey Ya!"

== People's Choice: Favourite International Artist ==
- Usher f. Ludacris & Lil' Jon — "Yeah!"
- 50 Cent — "P.I.M.P"
- Beyoncé f. Jay-Z — "Crazy In Love"
- Britney Spears — "Toxic"
- Hilary Duff — "Come Clean"

== People's Choice: Favourite Canadian Group ==
- Simple Plan — "Perfect"
- Billy Talent — "Try Honesty"
- Finger Eleven — "One Thing"
- Nickelback — "Someday"
- Three Days Grace — "I Hate (Everything About You)"

== People's Choice: Favourite Canadian Artist ==
- Avril Lavigne — "Don't Tell Me"
- Fefe Dobson — "Take Me Away"
- Hawksley Workman — "Anger as Beauty"
- Nelly Furtado — "Powerless (Say What You Want)"
- Sam Roberts — "Hard Road"

== VideoFACT Award ==
- Alexisonfire — Counterparts And Number Them

== Trail Blazer Award ==
- Beastie Boys

== Performers ==
- Beastie Boys - Ch-Check it Out/Intergalactic
- Three Days Grace - I Hate Everything About You
- Fefe Dobson - Take Me Away
- Hoobastank - The Reason
- Kanye West and John Legend - I'll Fly Away/Jesus Walks
- Finger Eleven - One Thing
- Hilary Duff - Come Clean
- Billy Talent - Try Honesty
- Evanescence - Everybody's Fool

== Presenters ==
- Avril Lavigne - presented MuchLOUD Best Rock Video
- Samaire Armstrong and Simple Plan - introduced Fefe Dobson
- Hilary Duff - presented Best Pop Video
- Sum 41 - presented Best International Video – Artist
- Christina Milian - introduced Hoobastank
- The Trews and Default - presented MuchVibe Best Rap Video
- Vivica A. Fox - introduced Kanye West and John Legend
- Kaley Cuoco - presented Best International Video - Group
- Amy Lee - introduced Finger Eleven
- Justin Hawkins - presented Best Video
- Keshia Chanté and David Gallagher - introduced Hilary Duff
- Tom Green – introduced Billy Talent
- Nickelback - presented People's Choice: Favourite Canadian Artist
- Sam Roberts and Hawksley Workman - presented People's Choice: Favourite International Artist
- Kyprios and In Essence - presented People's Choice: Favourite Canadian Group
- Pilate and Our Lady Peace - presented People's Choice: Favourite International Group
- Joel Madden - introduced Evanescence
