= Billy Talent (album) =

Studio album by Billy Talent
- Released: September 16, 2003
- Recorded: November 2002 – March 2003
- Studios: The Factory, Vancouver; Metalworks, Mississauga
- Genres: Punk rock; alternative rock; post-hardcore
- Length: 41:04
- Label: Atlantic
- Producer: Gavin "Golden" Brown

Billy Talent chronology
Try Honesty / Living in the Shadows (2003)	Billy Talent (2003)	Billy Talent II (2006)

Alternative cover
- Cover of the 10th anniversary edition

Singles from Billy Talent
- 1. "Try Honesty" Released: September 1, 2003; 2. "The Ex" Released: December 23, 2003; 3. "River Below" Released: July 5, 2004; 4. "Nothing to Lose" Released: November 16, 2004

Professional ratings
Review scores
Source	Rating
AllMusic	3/5 stars
The Daily Princetonian	(favorable)
Decoy Music	8/10 stars
Ottawa XPress	3.5/5 stars
Q Magazine	3/5 stars
Rock Hard	9.5/10
Sputnikmusic	4.5/5 stars

Billy Talent is the debut album of Canadian rock band Billy Talent, released in 2003. The band's previous album Watoosh! (1999) was released under their old name Pezz.

== Commercial performance ==
Billy Talent debuted at number 6 on the Canadian Albums Chart, selling 7,700 copies in its first week. The album was certified four-time platinum in Canada in January 2021. Between 1996 and 2016, Billy Talent was among the top 15 best-selling albums by Canadian bands in Canada and among the top 40 best-selling albums by Canadian artists overall in Canada.

== Reception ==
In 2005, Billy Talent was ranked number 453 in Rock Hard magazine's book The 500 Greatest Rock & Metal Albums of All Time.

In 2014, music magazine Vice praised the album in a retrospective review, stating; "Primarily fueled by guitarist Ian D’Sa’s signature single note riffs and frontman Ben Kowalewicz’s absolutely abrasive vocal delivery, Billy Talent was a sweaty, erratic, radio-ready punk rock album with some serious balls."

== Tenth anniversary ==
In August 2013, Billy Talent announced a Canadian tour for fall of that year entitled "A Return to the Roots", in which they played their entire first self-titled album live to celebrate its 10th anniversary. Soon after the tour, the band announced a 10th anniversary reissue of the album. The reissue was released on November 26, 2013 through Warner Bros. Records; it features a bonus disc of rare demos and live recordings of the album's track list.

== Track listing ==
All tracks are written by Billy Talent.

Standard edition
No.	Title	Length
1.	"This Is How It Goes"	3:27
2.	"Living in the Shadows"	3:15
3.	"Try Honesty"	4:13
4.	"Line & Sinker"	3:37
5.	"Lies"	2:58
6.	"The Ex"	2:40
7.	"River Below"	2:59
8.	"Standing in the Rain"	3:20
9.	"Cut the Curtains"	3:50
10.	"Prisoners of Today"	3:53
11.	"Nothing to Lose"	3:38
12.	"Voices of Violence"	3:10
Total length:		41:07

Japanese edition bonus tracks
No.	Title	Length
13.	"When I Was a Little Girl"	2:10
14.	"Beach Balls"	3:48
Total length:		47:05

Disc 2 – 10th anniversary edition reissue
No.	Title	Length
1.	"This Is How It Goes" (Demo Version)	3:08
2.	"Living in the Shadows" (Demo Version)	3:15
3.	"Try Honesty" (Demo Version)	4:05
4.	"Line & Sinker" (Live at Nova Rock Festival)	4:51
5.	"Lies" (Live Acoustic at SBN Studios)	3:05
6.	"The Ex" (Demo Version)	2:36
7.	"River Below" (Live at the Orange Lounge)	3:00
8.	"Standing in the Rain" (Live at Metalworks)	3:34
9.	"Cut the Curtains" (Demo Version)	3:38
10.	"Prisoners of Today" (Demo Version)	3:43
11.	"Nothing to Lose" (Live at Phillipshalle)	3:59
12.	"Voices of Violence" (Live at Norwegian Wood Festival)	3:20
Total length:		42:20

== Personnel ==
Billy Talent

- Benjamin Kowalewicz – lead vocals
- Ian D'Sa – guitar, vocals, art direction, package design
- Jonathan Gallant – bass guitar, vocals
- Aaron Solowoniuk – drums

Additional personnel

- Gavin Brown – production
- Jacquire King – recording
- Paul Silvera – digital editing
- Sheldon Zaharko – assistant engineer, digital editing
- Chris Lord-Alge – mixing
- Kevin Armstrong – assistant mix engineer
- Tom Baker – mastering
- Lawrence Azerrad – art direction, package design
- Dustin Rabin – photographer
- Peter Van Hattem – additional photography

== Chart positions ==
Chart	Position
Austrian Albums (Ö3 Austria)	38
Canadian Albums (Billboard)	6
German Albums (Offizielle Top 100)	97
UK Albums	124
US Billboard 200	194
US Heatseekers Albums (Billboard)	11

== Certifications ==
Region	Certification	Certified units/sales
Canada (Music Canada)	4× Platinum	400,000^{‡}
Canada (Music Canada) 10th Anniversary Edition	Gold	40,000^{‡}
Germany (BVMI)	Platinum	200,000^{^}
United Kingdom (BPI)	Silver	60,000^{‡}
^{^} Shipments figures based on certification alone.^{‡} Sales+streaming figures based on certification alone.
