= At Transformation =

Single by The Tragically Hip

from the album Now for Plan A
- Released: May 18, 2012
- Genre: Rock
- Length: 3:48
- Label: Universal Music Canada
- Songwriter(s): Rob Baker; Gordon Downie; Johnny Fay; Paul Langlois; Gord Sinclair
- Producer(s): Gavin Brown

The Tragically Hip singles chronology
"Speed River" (2009)	"At Transformation" (2012)	"Streets Ahead" (2012)

Music video
- "At Transformation" on YouTube

"At Transformation" is a song by Canadian rock group The Tragically Hip. It was released in May 2012 as the lead single from their twelfth full-length studio album, Now for Plan A. A 90-second clip of the song premiered during the opening segment of Hockey Night in Canada on May 12, 2012. The song premiered in its entirety on May 16 on Toronto radio station CFNY-FM. The song was released to radio stations on May 17 and was officially released digitally on May 18, 2012.

== Charts ==
Chart (2012)	Peak position
Canada (Canadian Hot 100)	63
Canada (Billboard) Canada Rock Chart	1
