= Sean Michael Turrell =

Sean Michael Turrell is a director of music videos and documentary television. He has directed videos for Canadian bands such as Billy Talent, Lights, Protest the Hero, Hedley, MSTRKRFT, Blue Rodeo, Great Lake Swimmers, Magneta Lane and Sum 41. He has also directed videos for Hawksley Workman, Michael Bublé, David Usher, Brendan Canning, Buck 65, Tegan and Sara and Good Charlotte.

He has been nominated for several MMVAs (Much Music Video Awards). His video for Billy Talent's "Try Honesty" won the 2004 Best Rock Video award at the MMVAs and "River Below" won the Best Video, and Best Rock Video awards at the 2005 MMVAs. His video for Hedley's "Cha-Ching" won Pop Video of the Year in 2010. He is also winner of a Juno Award for Best Video 2001 for Hawksley Workman's "Jealous of Your Cigarette". He has also made an appearance on MuchMusic's half-hour show Video On Trial as a juror, as well as an appearance on the 2006 VJ Search, and as a member of 90's art rocker band Misha Forke.

Sean's television direction includes the National Parks Project, Discovery Network's Invention Nation, Murder In Paradise, and Lifetime Network's two-hour documentary Colleen Stan: Girl In The Box.

His debut dramatic short film Follow, starring Rookie Blue's Gregory Smith, was produced by Rhombus Media and was nominated for a Golden Sheaf award for Best Canadian Drama at the Yorkton Film Festival. His second short film Odessa won the Grand Jury Prize at the Gasparilla International Film Festival, a Jury Award at the Santa Fe Film Festival, and the Silver Remi Award at WorldFest Houston.

In 2021 he premiered the short documentary film The Shot as part of the NBA Films for Fans project at the 2021 Toronto International Film Festival.

He is currently a film and television writer represented by Anonymous Content in Los Angeles.
