= Dead Silence (album) =

Studio album by Billy Talent
- Released: September 11, 2012
- Recorded: November 2011 – July 2012
- Studio: Armoury, Vancouver; Noble Street, Toronto; Vespa, Toronto; Steakhouse, North Hollywood; Dudebox, Toronto
- Genre: Alternative rock; punk rock; post-hardcore
- Length: 53:56
- Label: Warner; Last Gang
- Producer: Ian D'Sa

Billy Talent chronology
Billy Talent III (2009)	Dead Silence (2012)	Hits (2014)

Singles from Dead Silence
- 1. "Viking Death March" Released: May 25, 2012; 2. "Surprise Surprise" Released: August 7, 2012; 3. "Stand Up and Run" Released: February 4, 2013; 4. "Show Me the Way" Released: July 31, 2013

Dead Silence is the fourth studio album by Canadian rock band Billy Talent. It was released on September 11, 2012, and was produced by the band's guitarist Ian D'Sa.

The album's first single, "Viking Death March", was released on May 26, 2012. The second single, "Surprise Surprise", was released on August 7, 2012, and reached number 1 on the Canadian rock/alternative chart. Songs featured on the album were nominated at the 2013 Canadian Juno Awards, such as "Viking Death March" for single of the year.

== Background ==
Billy Talent started recording material for Dead Silence on November 25, 2011, and finished in July 2012. The title and artwork of the album were revealed on the band's Twitter, Facebook and official website on July 11, 2012. The artwork was created by poster artist Ken Taylor.

The band released the album on their SoundCloud account on September 4, 2012.

== Singles and music videos ==
- "Viking Death March"
- "Surprise Surprise"
- "Stand Up and Run"
- "Show Me the Way"
- "Runnin' Across the Tracks"
- "Love Was Still Around"

Online videos were released for both "Runnin' Across the Tracks" and "Love Was Still Around".

The teaser video for "Runnin' Across the Tracks" was revealed on October 2, 2013. A few weeks later, the full video was released online October 30, 2013.

A live online video for "Love Was Still Around" was released on May 26, 2015. The video was directed by touring photography and friend, Dustin Rabin.

== Track listing ==
All tracks are written by Billy Talent.

No.	Title	Length
1.	"Lonely Road to Absolution"	1:15
2.	"Viking Death March"	4:04
3.	"Surprise Surprise"	3:08
4.	"Runnin' Across the Tracks"	4:19
5.	"Love Was Still Around"	3:46
6.	"Stand Up and Run"	3:20
7.	"Crooked Minds"	5:04
8.	"Man Alive!"	3:36
9.	"Hanging by a Thread"	3:53
10.	"Cure for the Enemy"	4:26
11.	"Don't Count on the Wicked"	4:08
12.	"Show Me the Way"	3:06
13.	"Swallowed Up by the Ocean"	5:02
14.	"Dead Silence"	4:49

== Reception ==
Professional ratings
Review scores
Source	Rating
AllMusic	4/5 stars
Bring the Noise UK	10/10 stars
The Five 10	8.5/10 stars
Kerrang!	4/5 stars
Melodic.net	3/5 stars
Montreal Gazette	3.5/5 stars
Rock Magazine	10/10 stars
Rock Sound	9/10 stars
Toronto Sun	3.5/5 stars
Under the Gun	positive

Dead Silence has received positive reviews upon release, most critics praising the change of style from its predecessor, Billy Talent III.

== Personnel ==
Personnel taken from Dead Silence liner notes.

Billy Talent

- Benjamin Kowalewicz – lead vocals
- Ian D'Sa – guitar, backing vocals, piano, additional percussion, producer
- Jonathan Gallant – bass guitar, backing vocals
- Aaron Solowoniuk – drums

Additional musician

- Jeffrey Beecher – double bass on "Lonely Road to Absolution"

Technical personnel

- Eric Ratz – engineer
- Kenny Luong – digital engineer
- Paul Dutil – assistant engineer (The Armoury)
- Kevin O'Leary – assistant engineer (Noble Street)
- Brittany Huszczo – assistant engineer (Noble Street)
- Hiren Mistry – assistant engineer (Vespa)
- Ken Eisennagel – assistant engineer (Steakhouse)
- Chris Lord-Alge – mixing
- Keith Armstrong – assistant mix engineer
- Nik Karpen – assistant mix engineer
- Brad Townshend – additional assistant mix engineer
- Andrew Schubert – additional assistant mix engineer
- Ted Jensen – mastering
- Ken Taylor – artwork, package design
- Dustin Rabin – photography

== Charts ==
=== Weekly charts ===
Chart (2012–13)	Peak position
Australian Albums Chart	36
Austrian Albums Chart	2
Belgian Albums Chart (Flanders)	176
Belgian Albums Chart (Wallonia)	136
Canadian Albums Chart	1
Dutch Albums Chart	94
Finnish Albums Chart	12
German Albums Chart	1
Irish Albums Chart	94
Norwegian Albums Chart	26
Scottish Albums Chart	29
Swedish Albums Chart	52
Swiss Albums Chart	3
United Kingdom Albums Chart	23
US Billboard 200	135
US Heatseekers Albums	3
US Independent Albums	32

=== Year-end charts ===
Chart (2012)	Rank
Austrian Albums Chart	59
Canadian Albums Chart	50
German Albums Chart	60

== Certifications ==
Region	Certification	Certified units/sales
Canada (Music Canada)	Platinum	80,000^{^}
Germany (BVMI)	Gold	100,000^{^}
^{^} Shipments figures based on certification alone.
