= Surrender (Billy Talent song) =

Single by Billy Talent

from the album Billy Talent II
- Released: April 2, 2007
- Genre: Alternative rock, emo
- Length: 4:07
- Label: Atlantic
- Songwriter: Billy Talent
- Producer: Gavin Brown

Billy Talent singles chronology
"Fallen Leaves" (2006)	"Surrender" (2007)	"This Suffering" (2007)

"Surrender" is the fourth single from Canadian music group Billy Talent off their triple platinum selling album, Billy Talent II. The single was released on April 2, 2007.

The music video for it was shot in early February by Phil Harder.

== Track listing ==
=== UK 5" Single ===
1. "Surrender" (Radio Version)
2. "This Suffering" (Live at The Orange Lounge Toronto)
3. "Devil in a Midnight Mass" (Live at The Orange Lounge Toronto)

== Music video ==
The video, directed by Phil Harder, is simple in concept; it is a performance piece with the band playing in an apartment while lead singer Ben Kowalewicz sings to the camera. However, the frames run at a slower pace, implementing slow motion for dramatic effect. As the video progresses, things in the apartment (i.e.: dolls, glass containers, picture frames, windows) begin to explode, matching the tone and intensity of the song. Things continue to explode until the end of the video, when Kowalewicz falls to the floor of the ravaged apartment. Kowalewicz's collapse is due to the uncut version, in which he gets shot through the head (explaining the random explosions as gunshots).

== Chart performance ==
Chart (2007)	Peak position
Austria (Ö3 Austria Top 40)	45
Belgium (Ultratip Bubbling Under Flanders)	10
Czech Republic Airplay (ČNS IFPI)	68
Canada Hot 100 (Billboard)	22
Canada CHR/Top 40 (Billboard)	32
Canada Hot AC (Billboard)	48
Canada Rock (Billboard)	9
Germany (GfK)	46

== Certifications ==
Region	Certification	Certified units/sales
Austria (IFPI Austria)	Gold	15,000^{*}
Canada (Music Canada)	2× Platinum	160,000^{‡}
^{*} Sales figures based on certification alone.^{‡} Sales+streaming figures based on certification alone.
