= Hannah Georgas =

Canadian musician (born 1983)

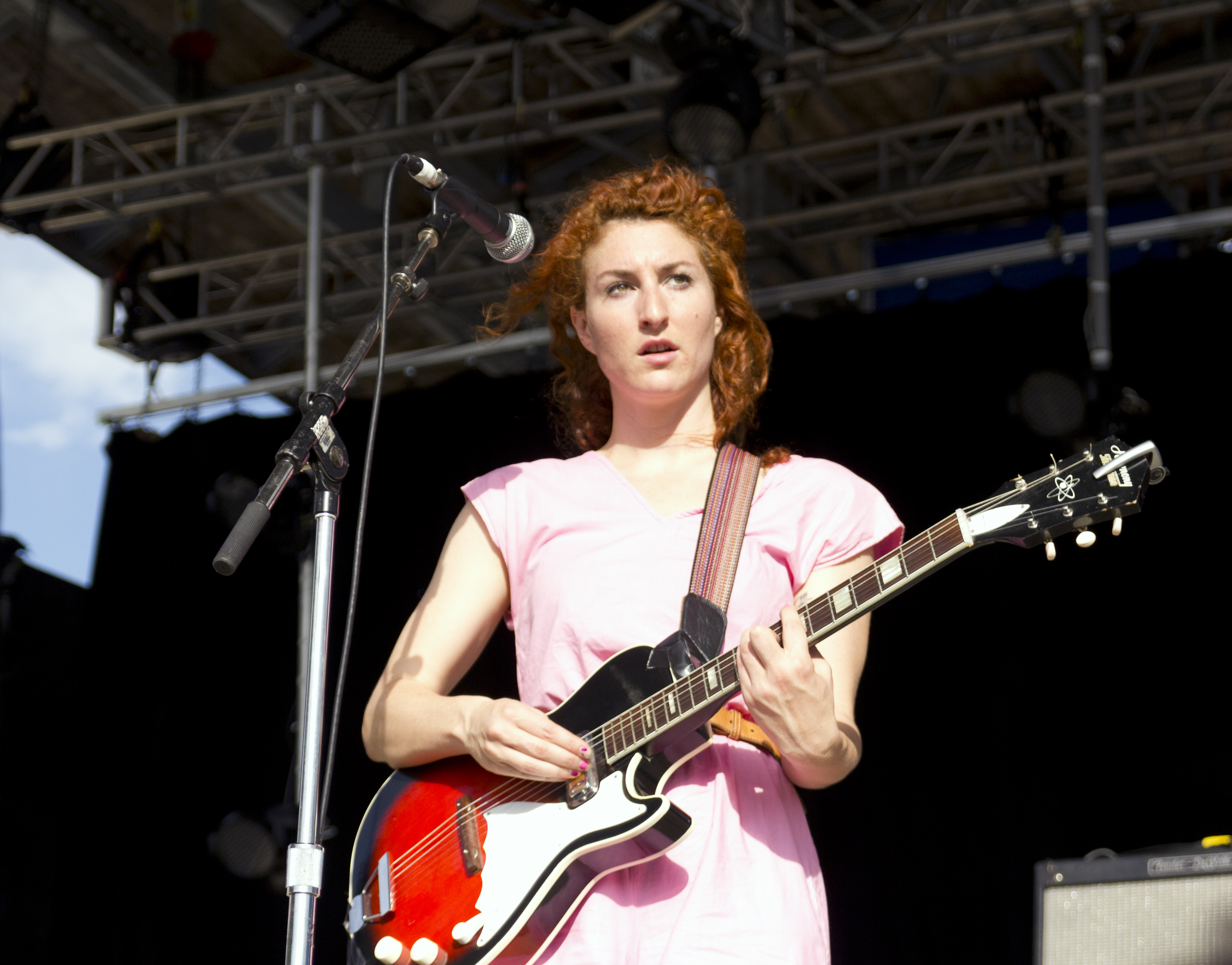
- Georgas performing at the 2011 Hillside Festival

Background information
- Born: 30 August 1983 (age 43); Newmarket, Ontario
- Origin: Vancouver, British Columbia
- Genre: Indie pop
- Occupation: Musician
- Instruments: Vocals; guitar; bass guitar; keys
- Years active: 2009–present
- Label: Arts & Crafts
- Website: hannahgeorgas.com

Hannah Georgas (born 30 August 1983) is a Canadian indie/pop singer-songwriter, based in Vancouver, British Columbia. She was nominated in the categories of "Best New Artist of the Year" and "Songwriter of the Year" at the 2011 Juno Awards, and again at the 2013 Juno Awards for "Songwriter of the Year" and "Best Alternative Album". She was nominated for a Juno in the 2022 Adult Alternative Album of the Year category for her album All That Emotion.

In 2024, she co-founded and created Beautiful View, a music festival that takes place in Belleville, Ontario that has featured acts like: Hayden, Julie Doiron, Bells Larsen and more.

Georgas is currently a member of the indie rock collective Broken Social Scene, after contributing lead vocals and cowriting Only The Good I Keep on their sixth studio album, Remember the Humans (2026).

== Biography ==
Originally from Newmarket, Ontario, she played in a band with Tim Oxford of Arkells in high school before moving to Victoria, British Columbia to attend university.

While in university, she recorded a number of song demos in a friend's recording studio and quickly attracted the attention of other area musicians, releasing her debut EP The Beat Stuff in 2009. The EP garnered airplay on CBC Radio 3, who later also named Georgas the winner of their 2009 Bucky Award for Best New Artist. She submitted the title track "The Beat Stuff" into The Music BC Songbird West Singer-Songwriter Competition and won. Following a show in New York City in 2009, Georgas was invited to write a song for a Wal-Mart commercial; the resulting track, "You've Got a Place Called Home", ran in the store's fall advertising campaign. An early version of the song "Shine" was featured on the television programs Defying Gravity and Flashpoint.

She released her full-length debut album, This Is Good, on 27 April 2010. The album was longlisted for the 2010 Polaris Music Prize. Two songs from the album, "Chit Chat" and "The Deep End", also appeared on a split single with Mark Watrous in 2009. "Chit Chat" was featured in the Cyber Bully soundtrack. In addition to touring to support the album, Georgas also performed some dates on the 2010 Lilith Fair tour. She subsequently contributed a new song, "Drive", to the 2010 edition of CBC Radio 2's Great Canadian Song Quest.

She was nominated in the categories of Best New Artist of the Year and Songwriter of the Year at the 2011 Juno Awards. She took home the Emerging Artist of the Year at XM's Verge Music Awards in 2011 as well as Solo Artist of the Year at the Sirius/XM-sponsored Indies.

In 2012, she has toured internationally as part of Kathleen Edwards' supporting band, and her second, self-titled album was released on 2 October 2012 with Dine Alone Records. In June 2013, the album was longlisted for the 2013 Polaris Music Prize. The album won Pop Recording of the Year at the Western Canadian Music Awards in 2013.

She was nominated for Songwriter of the Year and Alternative Album of the Year at the 2013 Juno Awards, and played her single "Robotic" at the awards ceremony.

In the winter of 2014, Georgas toured as an opening act for City and Colour throughout Europe and the United Kingdom. In the summer of 2014, Georgas toured as an opening act for Sara Bareilles.

Her song "Millions" was featured in the closing credits of Girls Season 3, Episode 6, on 9 February 2014.

Her new album For Evelyn, named after her grandmother, was released on 24 June 2016. The first single, "Don't Go", was released on 29 April 2016.

During fall 2016, she was on tour for album the For Evelyn throughout North America, Europe and the UK.

On 8 March 2019, for International Women's Day Georgas released the digital only EP Imprints, a collection of covers by women she considered influential to her. Appearing on the EP with her are Jess Wolfe and Holly Laessig of Brooklyn based indie pop band Lucius, Tamara Lindeman of Canadian folk music band The Weather Station, singer Emily King, and Montaigne.

Hannah Georgas toured with the The National as an opening act and a backup singer/chorus member during their I Am Easy to Find tour cycle. The lead singer Matt Berninger features on her song Pray it Away.

In June 2020, Georgas revealed details of her newest album titled All That Emotion which was released on 4 September 2020.

In 2023, Hannah Georgas released album called I'd Be Lying if I Said I Didn't Care on Real Kind Records and Arts & Crafts.

In 2026 she was a contributor to Broken Social Scene's album Remember the Humans.

== Discography ==
- The Beat Stuff (EP, 2009)
- This Is Good (2010)
- Hannah Georgas (2012)
- For Evelyn (2016)
- Imprints (EP, 2019 – Digital Only)
- All That Emotion (2020)
- I'd Be Lying if I Said I Didn't Care (2023)
