= Nothing to Lose (Billy Talent song) =

Single by Billy Talent

from the album Billy Talent
- Released: November 16, 2004
- Genre: Alternative rock, post-hardcore, emo
- Length: 3:38
- Label: Atlantic
- Songwriter: Billy Talent
- Producer: Gavin Brown

Billy Talent singles chronology
| "River Below" (2004) | "Nothing to Lose" (2004) | "Devil in a Midnight Mass" (2006) |

Music video
- "Nothing To Lose" on YouTube

"Nothing to Lose" is a song by Canadian alternative rock band, Billy Talent released on November 16, 2004, as the fourth and final single from their debut self-titled album. Issued as a promotional release, the song never received a physical CD or vinyl record single.

== Background and content ==
Based on real-life events, "Nothing to Lose" was directly inspired by the passing of Greg Doucette, a teenage boy from Brampton, Ontario who took his own life in 2002 after enduring prolonged bullying from classmates on a daily basis due to his acne during the school year at Notre Dame Catholic Secondary School. Upon discovering the news about Doucette's death, the band would write the song in his memory, intending it both as a tribute and a warning about the severe psychological harm bullying can inflict when vulnerable individuals are pushed beyond their limits.

Lyrically, the song is narrated from the perspective of a teenager who is driven to suicide as a result of relentless bullying at school. Despite concealing the abuse from their parents, the narrator internalizes their feelings of depression, isolation and rejection, even though it wears away at them. In a twist ending, it is revealed that the narrator has already died, confirming that the song recounts the circumstances leading to their suicide from beyond the grave.

== Music Video ==
Shot and filmed in black and white on location at Central Technical School in Toronto, Ontario, the accompanying music video, directed by Sean Michael Turrell released November 17, 2004 visually interprets the song's narrative, following an antisocial teenager over the course of a single school day. While largely ignored by most students, the teen becomes the target of harassment, despite remaining non-confrontational and withdrawn. The video intercuts between performance footage of the band playing in the school's automotive servicing garage and scenes presented from the teenager's first-person perspective.

Throughout the video, the teen writes fragments of song lyrics and drawings in a notebook. After being harassed and physically assaulted by peers in the school hallway, during which the notebook is stolen, the teen reaches a breaking point and flees to the garage in the school's basement. There, they attach an intake hose to a car's exhaust pipe, feed the other end into the vehicle through the rear window and start the engine, suffocating to death by carbon monoxide poisoning.

The video concludes with static shots of the now-empty school spaces previously occupied by the teen, ending on a final image of the notebook lying open on the hallway floor, displaying a drawing depicting the suicide. Due to its subject matter, the video ranked at #28 on MuchMusic’s "50 Most Controversial Videos" list.

== Kids help phone ==
To further highlight the song's subject matter, Billy Talent partnered with Kids Help Phone in conjunction with the single's release. The Canadian charitable organization provides toll-free phone and online counselling services for children and teens in crisis, with a focus on youth mental health and anti-bullying initiatives. Upon the song's initial release, the band pledged to donate $1.00 CAD to the organization each time “Nothing to Lose” was played on select Canadian radio stations. The music video concludes with Kids Help Phone's contact information displayed onscreen, accompanied by a message of hope and support:

"THERE'S LIFE BEYOND THESE WALLS"

KIDS HELP PHONE
JEUNESSE, J'ÉCOUTE
1 800 668 6868
www.kidshelpphone.ca

== Uses in other media ==
During a 2013 concert in Warsaw, lead singer Ben Kowalewicz revealed that "Nothing to Lose" served as an inspiration for the 2011 Polish drama, Sala samobójców (Suicide Room), stating that connection emerged after meeting the director, Jan Komasa during the band's previous visit to Warsaw. The song also appears in the film, notably in a scene in which the protagonist, Dominik (portrayed by Jakub Gierszal) attends school while carrying a loaded firearm.

== Chart positions ==
| Chart (2004–2005) | Peak position |
|---|---|
| Canada Rock Top 30 (Radio & Records) | 15 |

== Certifications ==
| Region | Certification | Certified units/sales |
|---|---|---|
| Canada (Music Canada) | Platinum | 80,000^{‡} |
^{‡} Sales+streaming figures based on certification alone.
