= Red Flag (song) =

Single by Billy Talent

from the album Billy Talent II
- Released: September 11, 2006
- Recorded: 2005
- Genre: Punk rock; post-hardcore
- Length: 3:16
- Label: Wea, Atlantic
- Songwriter: Billy Talent
- Producer: Gavin Brown

Billy Talent singles chronology
"Devil in a Midnight Mass" (2006)	"Red Flag" (2006)	"Fallen Leaves" (2006)

Music video
- "Red Flag" on YouTube

"Red Flag" is a song by Canadian rock group Billy Talent. It was released in September 2006 as second single from their second album, Billy Talent II.

The Canadian rock music radio station 102.1 The Edge listed "Red Flag" at #145 of their 200 Best New Rock Songs of the Millennium in 2010.

== Music video ==
The music video for this song, directed by Floria Sigismondi – known for her work with artists such as Sigur Rós and Björk – began shooting on July 21, 2005, and first began playing in the United Kingdom, on January 20, 2006, (on Scuzz). It debuted in Canada on MuchMusic the following day.

The final scene of the music video.

The video depicts a spontaneous revolution by youths, with the titular red flag itself being a symbol of socialism and revolt. It begins with a group of school children locked inside a school, screaming, "We want out!" Finally, they break through the handcuffed doors and proceed to run around the school and surrounding area, covering various symbols of authority and luxury – including a CCTV camera, a barbecue, a boat, a car, gas pumps and eventually the town hall – with red flags. As they run through the town, more people join in. Finally, they arrive at city hall where the members of Billy Talent are performing, and which has been covered with red flags. Most children begin to mosh to the song, while others continue to run around, covering things with red flags. One of the children throws history books into the crowd, destroying them. The video ends with the children standing under red smoke, with pages of the books falling behind them, all wearing Soviet GP-5 gas masks. Voices chanting "We want out!" can also be heard at the end of the video.

== Track listing ==
UK 5" single

1. Red Flag (Album Version)
2. Red Flag (Live at MTV Campus Invasion Germany)

UK 7" single

1. Red Flag (Album Version)
2. Where Is the Line? (Demo Version)

US single

1. Red Flag (Album Version)
2. Red Flag (Live at MTV Campus Invasion Germany)
3. Red Flag (Live at The Horseshoe Tavern)
4. Ever Fallen in Love (With Someone You Shouldn't've?)

== Personnel ==
Personnel taken from Billy Talent II liner notes.

Billy Talent

- Ben Kowalewicz – lead vocals
- Ian D'Sa – guitar, vocals
- Jon Gallant – bass, vocals
- Aaron Solowoniuk – drums

== In popular culture ==
The demo version of the song originally appeared in 2005 as a part of the soundtracks of a number of Electronic Arts video games, including NHL 06, Burnout Revenge, Burnout Legends and SSX On Tour. This demo was released by Atlantic Records on the Black Sampler II. The album version is different from the earlier release, with the bridge and refrain having been changed. It has also been used in the soundtrack for the 2007 movie TMNT.

== Chart performance ==
Chart (2006–2026)	Peak position
Austria (Ö3 Austria Top 40)	19
Canada Rock Top 30 (Radio & Records)	10
Czech Republic Modern Rock (ČNS IFPI)	8
Germany (GfK)	34
UK Singles (Official Charts)	49

== Certifications ==
Region	Certification	Certified units/sales
Canada (Music Canada)	3× Platinum	240,000^{‡}
Germany (BVMI)	Platinum	600,000^{‡}
^{‡} Sales+streaming figures based on certification alone.
