= Viking Death March =

Single by Billy Talent

from the album Dead Silence
- Released: May 25, 2012
- Genre: Punk rock, post-hardcore
- Length: 4:03
- Label: Warner Music Canada
- Songwriter: Billy Talent

Billy Talent singles chronology
"Diamond on a Landmine" (2010)	"Viking Death March" (2012)	"Surprise Surprise" (2012)

Music video
- "Viking Death March" on YouTube

"Viking Death March" is the first single by Billy Talent from their fourth studio album, Dead Silence. It was released on May 25, 2012.

== Song information ==
On May 14, 2012, the band announced in a video announcement on their YouTube channel that their new album would be delayed until the fall, instead of the previous tentative release date of July 2012, though a new song would be released until the end of the month. On May 18, 2012, the band released a teaser of the single and announced that the full song would be released on SoundCloud May 25, 2012.

Gregory Adams of Exclaim! describes the song as fused the band's typical "post-hardcore licks" with elements of new wave of British heavy metal and a time signature of 6/8.

== Music video ==
The music video was released on the band's official website and on the band's YouTube channel on July 16, 2012. It is a live music video compiled from live footage that was shot during the band's performances at the Rock am Ring festival in Nürburg, Germany on June 2, 2012 and at the Melkweg in Amsterdam, Netherlands on June 7, 2012. The music video was directed by Michael Maxxis and David Hogan.

== Charts ==
Chart (2012)	Peak position
Canadian Hot 100	69
Canada Rock Chart	7
Canadian Alternative Rock Chart	3

== Certifications ==
Region	Certification	Certified units/sales
Canada (Music Canada)	Platinum	80,000^{‡}
^{‡} Sales+streaming figures based on certification alone.
