= River Below =

Single by Billy Talent

from the album Billy Talent
- Released: June 5, 2004
- Genre: Post-hardcore, punk rock
- Length: 3:00
- Label: Atlantic
- Songwriters: Ian D'Sa, Jonathan Gallant, Benjamin Kowalewicz, Aaron Solowoniuk
- Producer: Gavin Brown

Billy Talent singles chronology
"The Ex" (2004)	"River Below" (2004)	"Nothing to Lose" (2004)

"River Below" is a song by the Canadian alternative rock band, Billy Talent released June 5, 2004 as the third single from their self-titled debut studio album. The following year, it would be nominated for Single of the Year at the 2005 Juno Awards.

== Music video ==
Directed by Sean Michael Turrell, the video, premiered July 9, 2004 centers around a nuclear engineer living in quiet isolation within a nondescript suburban neighbourhood. Initially calm and contemplative, he becomes increasingly agitated by his neighbours across the street, Billy Talent who perform the song in their open garage, disrupting his concentration and inner focus as he appeared to be engaged in some form of mental calculation. The setting is implied to be the 1950s, suggested by the engineer's attire and the period-specific technology throughout the video, while the band's presence is deliberately anachronistic.

Within the same instance, the engineer becomes distracted when his television inexplicably switches on, broadcasting bomb-testing and World War II footage. Unable to shut it off manually, he unplugs it in frustration. Irritated further by the band's continued performance, he retreats to his own garage, revealed to be a private workshop that suggests ties to the defence industry and a past in military service. There, he unrolls a detailed blueprint for a nuclear weapon, marking a clear shift in his mental state.

As the narrative escalates, the engineer appears to suffer a schizophrenic episode, as the blueprints and newspaper clippings pinned around the workshop begin to animate and rearrange themselves before his eyes. The reassembled headlines form ominous messages, urging on delusions of grandeur through total destruction. It is then revealed that the nuclear device has already been constructed and sits fully operational in the corner of the garage, which the engineer arms as the weapon begins its countdown. The video concludes grimly with the device detonating, annihilating the engineer, Billy Talent and presumably the surrounding neighbourhood, if not the world itself.

Shortly after its premiere, the ending was censored in certain regions, cutting away at the television flash and omitting the explosion entirely due to its release shortly after the 2004 Madrid train bombings. Despite the controversy, “River Below” ranked #7 on MuchMusic’s “Top 50 Most Controversial Videos” and placed #15 on MuchMusic's “100 Best Videos.” It would later go on to win Best Rock Video at the 2005 MuchMusic Video Awards.

=== Quotation at the beginning of the video ===
Now I am become Death, the Destroyer of Worlds

— J. Robert Oppenheimer

Written in the aftermath of the 2002 D.C. sniper attacks and partly inspired by the Oklahoma City bomber, Timothy McVeigh, the song frames its narrative from the perspective of a disciplined, ex-military “straight arrow” pushed beyond his psychological breaking point. These themes are made explicit in the video's opening moments with the quote attributed to American physicist, J. Robert Oppenheimer.

Often referred to as the “Father of the Atomic Bomb,” Oppenheimer serves as both a literal and symbolic reference point, as his words foreshadow the engineer's downward spiral throughout the video, while also expanding the scope of its message. The juxtaposition of a seemingly ordinary suburban backdrop against imagery of nuclear armageddon, suggests that the source of cataclysmic violence are not solely from a distant battlefields or abstract geopolitics, but can grow from human fragility and indoctrination in one's own community, when amplified by access to catastrophic forces. Overall, the engineer's actions echo Oppenheimer's warning on a global scale; that true danger lies not only in the weapon itself, but in the hands and minds of those with the power to wield it.

While Oppenheimer is best known for his association to this famous line, the quote is originally attributed to the Hindu deity, Vishnu
in a passage of the Hindu scripture of "Bhagavad Gita".

== Track listing ==
CD Single
No.	Title	Length
1.	"River Below"	3:00
2.	"Lies" (Acoustic)	3:06
Total length:		6:06

UK 7" Single
No.	Title	Length
1.	"River Below"	3:00
2.	"Standing In The Rain" (Acoustic)	3:08
Total length:		6:08

DVD
No.	Title	Length
1.	"River Below"	3:00
2.	"Living in the Shadows"	3:17
3.	"River Below" (Official Video)	3:34
4.	"Try Honesty" (Official Video)	4:06
5.	"EPK Bonus Footage" (Video)
Total length:		:

== Chart performance ==
Chart (2004)	Peak position
Canada Rock Top 30 (Radio & Records)	12
UK Singles (OCC)	70
UK Rock & Metal (OCC)	6

== Certifications ==
Region	Certification	Certified units/sales
Canada (Music Canada)	2× Platinum	160,000^{‡}
^{‡} Sales+streaming figures based on certification alone.
