= Stand Up and Run =

Single by Billy Talent

from the album Dead Silence
- Released: February 6, 2013
- Genre: Alternative rock, emo
- Length: 3:20
- Label: Warner Music Canada
- Songwriter: Billy Talent

Billy Talent singles chronology
"Surprise Surprise" (2012)	"Stand Up and Run" (2013)	"Show Me The Way" (2013)

Music video
- "Stand Up and Run" on YouTube

"Stand Up and Run" is a song by Canadian band Billy Talent. It was released in February 2013 as the third single from the band's fourth studio album, Dead Silence. The song's music video was released on February 6, 2013, on YouTube. The song was successful in Canada, peaking at #90 on the Canadian Hot 100 and holding the #1 position on the Billboard Canadian Rock Chart for six weeks straight.

== Charts ==
Chart (2013)	Peak position
Canada (Canadian Hot 100)	90
