= Fallen Leaves (song) =

Single by Billy Talent

from the album Billy Talent II
- Released: November 19, 2006
- Genre: Alternative rock, punk rock
- Length: 3:19
- Label: Atlantic
- Songwriter: Billy Talent
- Producer: Gavin Brown

Billy Talent singles chronology
"Red Flag" (2006)	"Fallen Leaves" (2006)	"Surrender" (2007)

Music video
- "Fallen Leaves" on YouTube

"Fallen Leaves" is a song by Canadian rock group Billy Talent. It was released in November 2006 as the third single from their second studio album, Billy Talent II.

== Song information ==
The song is about one person who travels to the district of Downtown Eastside in Vancouver, British Columbia and then becomes a heroin addict. The lyrics supporting this connotation are as follows.

1st Verse- "I hitched a ride until the coast// To leave behind all of my ghosts// Searching for something I couldn't find at home// Can't get no job, can you spare a dime?// Just one more hit and I'll be fine// I swear to God this will be my one last time"

The protagonist hitchhikes to Vancouver, in search of escape from his old mistakes. However, he ends up homeless and addicted to drugs (presumably heroin).

2nd Verse- "When it gets dark in Pigeon Park// Voice in my head will soon be fed// By the vultures that circle round the dead"

The protagonist ends up in Pigeon Park, a real location in Vancouver. He ends up either so hungry or drugged that he starts hearing voices, which he says will "be fed by the vultures".

Bridge- "I never once thought I'd ever be caught// Staring at sidewalks, hiding my track marks// I left my best friends// Or did they just leave me?"

The character relapses on his guilt, justifying in his head that his friends are at fault for leaving him instead, after also thinking about how he never thought he could get addicted to anything.

== Track listing ==
UK 5" Single

1. Fallen Leaves (Album Version)
2. Fallen Leaves (Live at MTV Campus Invasion Germany)
3. Prisoners of Today (Album Version)

== Music video ==
The music video for the single was released in Canada on November 27, 2006 and worldwide the following week. The video, directed by Dean Karr, begins with a chicken on an engine of a car with Billy Talent in it, (also Ian's guitar's nickname-the "striped rooster"). The band rides through several orange falling leaves and arrive at a dinner party full of strange unspecified creatures. At one point, Billy Talent walks through a dark forest and finds a pool with a woman inside of it; the woman wakes up in the water and starts to panic. One of the monsters ask the band to play and they obey, playing their song "Fallen Leaves" in front of the crowd. Afterwards, Billy Talent exits through a door as the creatures applaud them for their performance.

The video was directed by Dean Karr and Ian D'Sa. The video also reached the number 1 spot at the MuchMusic Countdown on February 23, 2008. It would eventually go on to win the MuchMusic Video Award for Best Video and the MuchMusic Video Award for Best Rock Video that same year.

== Chart performance ==
Chart (2006–07)	Peak position
Austria (Ö3 Austria Top 40)	34
Belgium (Ultratip Bubbling Under Flanders)	18
Canada Hot 100 (Billboard)	22
Canada CHR/Top 40 (Billboard)	37
Canada Rock (Billboard)	2
Germany (GfK)	35
Switzerland (Schweizer Hitparade)	91
UK Rock & Metal (OCC)	2

== Certifications ==
Region	Certification	Certified units/sales
Austria (IFPI Austria)	Platinum	30,000^{*}
Canada (Music Canada)	4× Platinum	320,000^{‡}
^{*} Sales figures based on certification alone.^{‡} Sales+streaming figures based on certification alone.
