= Devil in a Midnight Mass =

Single by Billy Talent

from the album Billy Talent II
- Released: April 20, 2006
- Genre: Post-hardcore, punk, alternative rock
- Length: 2:52
- Label: Wea, Atlantic
- Songwriter: Billy Talent
- Producer: Gavin Brown

Billy Talent singles chronology
"Nothing to Lose" (2004)	"Devil in a Midnight Mass" (2006)	"Red Flag" (2006)

Alternative Cover
- Cover of UK version

Music video
- "Devil In A Midnight Mass" on YouTube

Audio sample
- "Devil in a Midnight Mass": file; help

"Devil in a Midnight Mass" is a song by Canadian alternative rock band, Billy Talent released April 20, 2006 which served as the first and lead single from their second studio album, Billy Talent II. The song would peak at #4 on the Canadian Singles Chart.

== Background and content ==
"Devil in a Midnight Mass" first materialized on December 25, 2005 as a rough and slightly rearranged demo shared exclusively through their Myspace as a way to generate buzz for their next album and provide a sneak peek of new music for fans. Several months later, the band would announce their second self-titled album, alongside the official studio version of "Devil in a Midnight Mass" as the first single on April 20, 2006.

On May 29, 2006, Canadian music channel, MuchMusic premiered the video on an episode of its limited special, "On Set" which offered a behind-the-scenes look at music videos during filming and production. The episode, hosted by Sarah Taylor and filmed on location at St. Anne's Anglican Church in Toronto, Ontario, followed Billy Talent during the making of the video, as well as the actors and children involved in the shoot. During the segment, additional context about the song's origins and meaning was provided by lead singer and songwriter, Ben Kowalewicz.

In his interview with Taylor, Kowalewicz explained that the song began when guitarist, Ian D'Sa played a sinister-sounding riff during a writing session, prompting Kowalewicz to ask himself, "What is the worst or most evil thing a person could do to another?" as a starting point for the lyrics. He went on to describe reading an article about John Geoghan, an American Catholic priest and convicted rapist killed while serving time in prison for indecent assault and battery, who had faced numerous accusations of child abuse and molestation over three decades across several parishes within the Greater Boston area. Despite awareness of his behaviour, the Boston archdiocese had enabled the continued abuse through negligence. After learning about the case, Kowalewicz decided to make the song about that subject matter.

Kowalewicz recounting the song's backstory with MuchMusic's Sarah Taylor,

It's from a story I read about Boston priest, John Geoghan who had been arrested for child abuse and the church kept moving him from parish to parish. The Supreme Court tried and convicted him of molesting 150 kids over a 30-year span and while he was serving his sentence another inmate broke into his cell and murdered him. I stumble upon these stories, they don't necessarily have to be directly personal but it's things like this that move me. I'm a big advocate for children's rights and this song looks at sexual abuse. It's not against the church or anything, it's more about that individual betrayal between adult and child. I don't have the answers, but hopefully if I sing about a certain issue it will get people talking about it.

== Music video ==
Directed by the band's frequent collaborator Sean Michael Turrell, the music video, released May 29, 2006 presents an allegorical interpretation of the song's controversial subject matter, framed through the lens of a horror film. The video's unsettling imagery centers on a young altar boy in a church being stalked by an amorphous dark fog, which serves as a visual metaphor for a predatory priest, portrayed as a figurative devil. Intercut throughout are scenes of the band performing the song on a rotating platform within the church's nave.

The narrative begins with the boy asleep in the church dormitory, where he is awakened by sudden paranormal disturbances (i.e.: papers violently scattering with phantom writing appearing, and blood seeping from windows and walls, etc.) followed by the fog invading the room, prompting the boy to flee.

As he continues to evade the presence, the boy descends into the church's dimly-lit basement carrying a lantern. There, he encounters a mouthless vagrant (implied to be a former victim of the presence, now grown and traumatized). Startled, the boy drops the lantern and runs deeper into the basement tunnels, ultimately reaching a boarded-up dead end. With no escape, he arms himself with an emergency axe mounted on the wall. When the fog attacks, the boy is consumed but fights back, forcing it to retreat and uses the axe to break through the barricade and escape.

Emerging into the nave, the boy looks up to see a group of mouthless altar boys standing atop the high balcony, representing the priest's silenced victims. In the final moments, the boy himself is revealed to be mouthless, gazing up from the church aisle, signifying that he has become the presence's latest victim.

The video premiered on Fuse on the show Oven Fresh, which highlights new videos. On MuchMusic, the video was ranked #74 on their 100 Best Videos and #47 on 50 Most Controversial Videos.

== Track listing ==
CD Single
No.	Title	Length
1.	"Devil In A Midnight Mass"	2:52
2.	"Devil In A Midnight Mass" (Demo Version)	3:19
Total length:		6:14

CD Maxi-Single
No.	Title	Length
1.	"Devil In A Midnight Mass"	2:52
2.	"Devil In A Midnight Mass" (Demo Version)	3:19
3.	"Ever Fallen in Love (with Someone You Shouldn't've)" (Buzzcocks cover)	2:43
Total length:		9:00

UK 7" Picture Disc - Clock Variant
No.	Title	Length
1.	"Devil In A Midnight Mass"	2:52
2.	"Red Flag" (Demo Version)	3:36
Total length:		6:28

UK 7" Picture Disc - Devil Variant
No.	Title	Length
1.	"Devil In A Midnight Mass"	2:52
2.	"Ever Fallen in Love (with Someone You Shouldn't've)" (Buzzcocks cover)	2:43
Total length:		5:34

== Chart performance ==
Chart (2006)	Peak position
Canada (Canadian Singles Chart)	4
Canada Rock Top 30 (Radio & Records)	5
UK Singles (OCC)	66
UK Rock & Metal (OCC)	3

== Certifications ==
Region	Certification	Certified units/sales
Canada (Music Canada)	2× Platinum	160,000^{‡}
^{‡} Sales+streaming figures based on certification alone.
