= Surprise Surprise (Billy Talent song) =

Single by Billy Talent

from the album Dead Silence
- Released: August 7, 2012
- Genre: Punk rock, post-hardcore
- Length: 3:07
- Label: Warner Music Canada
- Songwriter: Billy Talent

Billy Talent singles chronology
| "Viking Death March" (2012) | "Surprise Surprise" (2012) | "Stand Up and Run" (2013) |

"Surprise Surprise" is the second single by Billy Talent from their fourth studio album, Dead Silence. It was released on August 7, 2012 on iTunes.

== Song information ==
On July 21, 2012, the band announced via their Tumblr account that they had spent the day filming the music video for their next single, although they were unsure of exactly when it would be released.

Much of the footage for the video was shot at the Canadian Warplane Heritage Museum in Hamilton, Ontario.

Jonathan Gallant, the band's bassist, shared this via his Twitter account:

Video shoot for our next single is happening now. Its gonna be awesome! Fighter planes, flying sharks, hipsters a pig man... What a life!

— Jonathan Gallant, via Twitter

The music video was released October 12. 2012.

== Music video ==
The music video starts off with Ben, Ian, Aaron, and John in a military conference room, after their commanding officer dismisses them, the band each heads toward their separate fighter planes, the song begins after the "Pig Man" squeals, when the band reaches the Pig City inhabited only by hipsters. The band starts to destroy the Pig Man's army of flying sharks, the Pig Man gets into a giant flying snake, when the guitar solo starts, the back of Ian's fighter jet gets bit off by a flying shark, causing him to crash. When the guitar solo finishes, Aaron starts to shoot at a flying shark with an MP5, Aaron's target flies behind John, causing Aaron to shoot John's plane multiple times, John crashes into the side of a building, Aaron's plane immediately gets destroyed by a flying shark. Ben, the last man standing, is left to fight the Pig Man one-on-one, after a small firefight, Ben's ultimate fate is a kamikaze into the flying snake.

== Charts ==
| Chart (2012) | Peak position |
|---|---|
| Canada (Canadian Hot 100) | 77 |
| Germany (GfK) | 77 |

== Certifications ==
| Region | Certification | Certified units/sales |
|---|---|---|
| Canada (Music Canada) | Platinum | 80,000^{‡} |
^{‡} Sales+streaming figures based on certification alone.
