= Try Honesty =

Single by Billy Talent

from the album Billy Talent
- Released: July 1, 2003
- Genre: post-hardcore, punk, alternative rock, emo
- Length: 4:13; 3:56 (radio edit)
- Label: Atlantic
- Songwriter: Billy Talent
- Producer: Gavin Brown

Billy Talent singles chronology
"Try Honesty" (2003)	"The Ex" (2004)

Music video
- "Try Honesty" on YouTube

Alternative cover
- Promotional US variant cover

Audio sample
- "Try Honesty": file; help

"Try Honesty" is the debut single by Canadian alternative rock band, Billy Talent, released July 1, 2003 as the lead single from their debut self-titled album via Atlantic Records. The song would go on to be a commercial mainstream success and a break-though hit for the group upon its release. The following year, "Try Honesty" would receive a Juno Award for Single of the Year at the 2004 Juno Awards.

== Music video ==
Directed by Sean Michael Turrell, The music video for Try Honesty, premiered July 23, 2003, features stylized performance footage of the band in what appears to be an abandoned facility (filmed on location at the former Whitby Psychiatric Hospital in Whitby, Ontario).

Intercut throughout the band's performance are sequences which heavily imply the hospital is haunted, due to a series of paranormal occurrences (ie: disembodied shadows, unnatural movement of family portrait, inanimate objects repositioning themselves, a seemingly-possessed toy doll opening its own eyes, etc...).

Midway through the video, a dark cloud descends over the facility during the song's bridge, accompanied by thunder and lightning that mirror the track's rising intensity. The sky clears once the bridge resolves, after which the band (now in the hospital's infirmary) continues to perform, framed against increased supernatural activity. The video concludes with the facility's front doors being blown from their frame as the song ends.

While the video saw moderate airplay on Fuse in the United States, it received heavy rotation in Canada on Muchmusic and would go on to win a Much Music Video Awards for Best Rock Video in 2004.

== Track listing ==
All tracks are written by Billy Talent.

Promo single edition
No.	Title	Length
1.	"Try Honesty" (Radio Edit)	3:56
2.	"Try Honesty" (Album Version)	4:13
Total length:		8:09

Enhanced CD Single
No.	Title	Length
1.	"Try Honesty" (Radio Edit)	3:56
2.	"When I Was A Little Girl"	2:11
3.	"Beach Balls" (Demo)	3:50
4.	"Try Honesty" (Official Music Video)	4:06
Total length:		14:03

7" single vinyl picture disc
No.	Title	Length
1.	"Try Honesty" (Radio Edit)	3:56
2.	"When I Was A Little Girl"	2:11
Total length:		6:07

== Personnel ==
Personnel taken from Billy Talent liner notes.

Billy Talent

- Benjamin Kowalewicz – vocals
- Ian D'Sa – guitar, vocals
- Jonathan Gallant – bass, vocals
- Aaron Solowoniuk – drums

== Charts ==
Chart (2003–2004)	Peak position
UK Singles (OCC)	68
US Alternative Airplay (Billboard)	24

== Certifications ==
Region	Certification	Certified units/sales
Canada (Music Canada)	2× Platinum	160,000^{‡}
^{‡} Sales+streaming figures based on certification alone.
