= Billy Talent discography =

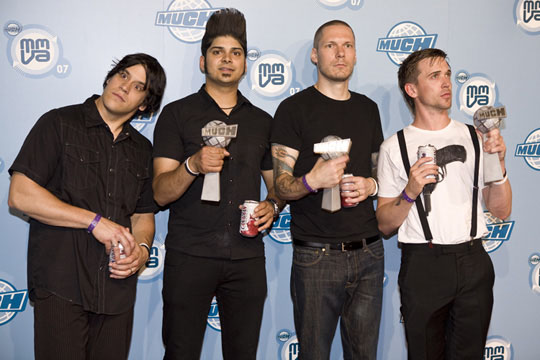
- Billy Talent at the 2007 MuchMusic Video Awards (from left to right) Jonathan Gallant, Ian D'Sa, Aaron Solowoniuk, Benjamin Kowalewicz
- Studio albums: 7
- Extended plays: 6
- Live albums: 3
- Singles: 31
- Video albums: 1
- Music videos: 28
- Demos/unreleased tracks: 26

This is the discography of Canadian rock band Billy Talent. Three releases are included from when the band was known as Pezz. These items are Demoluca, Dudebox, and Watoosh!. Besides those, this discography documents every studio album, live album, EP, DVD and single released under the name Billy Talent.

== Albums ==
=== Studio albums ===
List of studio albums, with selected chart positions and certifications
Title	Album details	Peak chart positions										Certifications
Title	Album details	CAN	AUS	AUT	BEL (FL)	FIN	GER	IRL	SWI	UK	US	Certifications
Watoosh!	Released: July 23, 1999; Label: Dudebox (Self-released); Released under the name Pezz	—	—	—	—	—	—	—	—	—	—	
Billy Talent	Released: September 16, 2003; Label: Dudebox, Atlantic	6	—	38	—	—	97	—	—	124	194	MC: 4× Platinum; BVMI: Platinum; BPI: Silver
Billy Talent II	Released: June 27, 2006; Label: Dudebox, Atlantic	1	— (Note: Billy Talent II did not enter the ARIA Albums Chart, but peaked at number 8 on the Hitseekers Albums chart.)	4	80	22	1	—	31	46	134	MC: 4× Platinum; BVMI: 2× Platinum; BPI: Silver; IFPI AUT: Platinum
Billy Talent III	Released: September 22, 2009; Label: Dudebox, Warner Music Canada, Roadrunner	1	44	2	—	3	2	98	3	35	107	MC: 3× Platinum; BVMI: 2× Platinum; IFPI AUT: Platinum
Dead Silence	Released: September 11, 2012; Label: Dudebox, Warner Canada, Last Gang	1	36	2	176	12	1	94	3	23	135	MC: Platinum; BVMI: Gold; IFPI AUT: Gold
Afraid of Heights	Released: July 29, 2016; Label: Dudebox, Warner Canada, The End	1	26	1	66	26	1	—	1	23	— (Note: Afraid of Heights did not enter the US Billboard 200, but peaked at number eight on the US Heatseekers Albums Chart.)	MC: Gold; BVMI: Gold
Crisis of Faith	Released: January 21, 2022; Label: Spinefarm	8	—	2	—	—	1	—	1	— (Note: Crisis of Faith did not enter the UK Albums Chart, but peaked at number 38 on the UK Album Sales Chart.)	—	MC: Gold
"—" denotes a release that did not chart.

=== Live albums ===
List of live albums, with selected chart positions
Title	Album details	Peak chart positions		Certifications
Title	Album details	AUT	GER	Certifications
Live from the UK Sept./2006	Released: September 8/16, 2006; Label: Dudebox, Atlantic	—	—	
666	Released: November 27, 2007; Label: Dudebox, Atlantic	17	31	MC: Platinum
Live at Festhalle Frankfurt	Released: June 16, 2023; Label: Dudebox, Warner Music Canada	—	34	MC: 3× Platinum
"—" denotes a release that did not chart.

=== Compilation albums ===
List of compilation albums, with selected chart positions
Title	Album details	Peak chart positions			Certifications
Title	Album details	CAN	GER	SWI	Certifications
Hits	Released: November 4, 2014; Label: Dudebox, Warner Music Canada	15	64	79	MC: 2× Platinum

== Extended plays ==
Title	Album details
Demoluca	Released: 1994; Label: Dudebox (Self-released); Released under the name Pezz
Dudebox	Released: January 1995; Label: Dudebox (Self-released); Released under the name Pezz
Try Honesty EP	Released: 2001; Label: Dudebox, Atlantic
Try Honesty/Living in the Shadows	Released: 2003; Label: Dudebox (Self-released)
Rusted from the Rain EP	Released: July 28, 2009; Label: Dudebox, Warner
iTunes Session	Released: February 16, 2010; Label: Dudebox, iTunes

== Singles ==
Title	Year	Peak chart positions										Certifications	Album
Title	Year	CAN	CAN Rock	AUT	BEL (FL)	CZ	GER	SCO	SWI	UK	US Alt.	Certifications	Album
"Try Honesty"	2003	—	×	—	—	—	—	84	—	68	24	MC: 2× Platinum	Billy Talent
"The Ex"	2003	—	×	—	—	—	—	74	—	61	—	MC: Gold	Billy Talent
"River Below"	2004	—	12	—	—	—	—	88	—	70	—	MC: 2× Platinum	Billy Talent
"Nothing to Lose"	2004	—	15	—	—	—	—	—	—	—	—	MC: Platinum	Billy Talent
"Devil in a Midnight Mass"	2006	4	5	—	—	—	—	48	—	66	—	MC: 2× Platinum	Billy Talent II
"Red Flag"	2006	—	10	19	—	—	34	40	—	49	—	MC: 3× Platinum; BVMI: Platinum	Billy Talent II
"Fallen Leaves"	2006	22	2	34	68	—	35	57	91	— (Note: "Fallen Leaves" did not enter the UK Singles Chart, but peaked at number 43 on the UK Physical Singles Chart.)	—	MC: 4× Platinum; IFPI AUT: Platinum	Billy Talent II
"Surrender"	2007	22	9	45	60	68	46	86	—	— (Note: "Surrender" did not enter the UK Singles Chart, but peaked at number 77 on the UK Physical Singles Chart.)	—	MC: 2× Platinum; IFPI AUT: Gold	Billy Talent II
"This Suffering"	2007	93	27	—	—	—	—	—	—	—	—	MC: Platinum	Billy Talent II
"Turn Your Back" (Single Version) (featuring Anti-Flag)	2009	23	19	50	—	—	—	—	—	—	—	MC: Gold	Billy Talent III
"Rusted from the Rain"	2009	9	1	19	—	—	14	95	53	— (Note: "Rusted from the Rain" did not enter the UK Singles Chart, but peaked at number 59 on the UK Physical Singles Chart.)	—	MC: 5× Platinum; BVMI: Gold; IFPI AUT: Gold; RMNZ: Gold	Billy Talent III
"Devil on My Shoulder"	2009	46	2	—	—	—	—	—	—	—	—	MC: 2× Platinum	Billy Talent III
"Saint Veronika"	2010	62	3	—	—	—	—	—	—	—	—	MC: Gold	Billy Talent III
"Diamond on a Landmine"	2010	88	7	—	—	—	—	—	—	—	—	MC: Gold	Billy Talent III
"Viking Death March"	2012	69	7	—	—	—	—	—	—	—	—	MC: Platinum	Dead Silence
"Surprise Surprise"	2012	77	1	—	—	—	77	—	—	—	—	MC: Platinum	Dead Silence
"Stand Up and Run"	2013	90	1	—	—	—	—	—	—	—	—		Dead Silence
"Show Me the Way"	2013	—	8	—	—	—	—	—	—	—	—		Dead Silence
"Kingdom of Zod"	2014	—	5	—	—	—	—	—	—	—	—		Hits
"Chasing the Sun"	2014	—	34	—	—	—	—	—	—	—	—		Hits
"Afraid of Heights"	2016	—	1	—	—	—	—	—	—	—	—	MC: Platinum	Afraid of Heights
"Louder Than the DJ"	2016	—	18	—	—	—	—	—	—	—	—		Afraid of Heights
"Ghost Ship of Cannibal Rats"	2016	—	21	—	—	—	—	—	—	—	—		Afraid of Heights
"A Passage to Bangkok" (Rush Cover)	2016	—	—	—	—	—	—	—	—	—	—		Non-album single
"Reckless Paradise"	2020	— (Note: "Reckless Paradise" did not enter the Canadian Singles Chart, but peaked at number 46 on the Canadian Digital Songs chart.)	1	—	—	—	—	—	—	—	—	MC: Platinum	Crisis of Faith
"I Beg to Differ (This Will Get Better)"	2020	— (Note: "I Beg to Differ (This Will Get Better)" did not enter the Canadian Singles Chart, but peaked at number 34 on the Canadian Digital Songs chart.)	1	—	—	—	—	—	—	—	—	MC: Gold	Crisis of Faith
"End of Me" (featuring Rivers Cuomo)	2021	—	1	—	—	—	—	—	—	—	—	MC: Gold	Crisis of Faith
"The Wolf"	2022	—	13	—	—	—	—	—	—	—	—		Crisis of Faith
"Limelight" (Amazon Music Original) (Rush Cover)	2025	—	—	—	—	—	—	—	—	—	—		Non-album single
"—" denotes a release that did not chart. "×" denotes periods where charts did not exist or were not archived.

== Other charted and certified songs ==
Title	Year	Peak chart positions		Certifications	Album
Title	Year	CAN Rock	CZ Rock	Certifications	Album
"This Is How It Goes"	2003	—	—	MC: Gold	Billy Talent
“Line and Sinker”	2003	—	—	MC: Gold	Billy Talent
"Pins and Needles"	2006	—	—	MC: Gold	Billy Talent II
"Diamond On A Landmine" (Live)	2010	43	—		iTunes Session
"Big Red Gun"	2016	—	2		Afraid of Heights
"The Crutch"	2016	—	7		Afraid of Heights
"Time-Bomb Ticking Away"	2016	50	—		Afraid of Heights
"One Less Problem"	2022	—	9		Crisis of Faith
"—" denotes a release that did not chart.

== DVDs ==
- Scandalous Travelers (2004, CAN: Platinum)

== Demos and non-album tracks (b-sides, covers, etc) ==
Title	Year	Type	Format				Release(s)
Title	Year	Type	7"	CD	Digital	Streaming	Release(s)
"You Had It All"	2000	Demo		Yes			Billy Talent Demo
"Beach Balls" (Demo)	2000	Demo		Yes			Billy Talent Demo
"Try Honesty" (Original Demo)	2001	Demo		Yes			Try Honesty EP
"This Is How It Goes" (Original Demo)	2001	Demo		Yes			Try Honesty EP
"Cut the Curtains" (Original Demo)	2001	Demo		Yes			Try Honesty EP
"Beach Balls"	2001	B-Side		Yes	Yes		• Try Honesty EP • Try Honesty - Single • Billy Talent - Japanese Edition
"Living in the Shadows" (Industry Demo)	2002	Demo		Yes	Yes	Yes	• Industry Demo • Billy Talent - 10th Anniversary Edition
"Try Honesty" (Industry Demo)	2002	Demo		Yes	Yes	Yes	• Industry Demo • Billy Talent - 10th Anniversary Edition
"The Ex" (Industry Demo)	2002	Demo		Yes	Yes	Yes	• Industry Demo • Billy Talent - 10th Anniversary Edition
"Cut the Curtain" (Industry Demo)	2002	Demo		Yes	Yes	Yes	• Industry Demo • Billy Talent - 10th Anniversary Edition
"Prisoners of Today" (Industry Demo)	2002	Demo		Yes	Yes	Yes	• Industry Demo • Billy Talent - 10th Anniversary Edition
"This Is How It Goes" (Industry Demo)	2002	Demo		Yes	Yes	Yes	• Industry Demo • Billy Talent - 10th Anniversary Edition
"When I Was a Little Girl"	2003	B-Side	Yes	Yes	Yes		• Try Honesty - Single • Billy Talent - Japanese Edition
"Waiting Room" (Fugazi cover)	2003	Live	Yes	Yes			The Ex - Single
"Red Flag" (Demo)	2006	Demo	Yes		Yes		Devil in a Midnight Mass - Single
"Devil in a Midnight Mass" (Demo)	2006	Demo		Yes	Yes	Yes	Devil in a Midnight Mass - Single
"Ever Fallen in Love (With Someone You Shouldn't've?)" (Buzzcocks cover)	2006	Cover	Yes	Yes	Yes	Yes	• Devil in a Midnight Mass - Single • Red Flag - Single
"This Suffering" (Demo)	2006	Demo			Yes		D2C via Myspace
"Where Is the Line?" (Demo)	2006	Demo	Yes				Red Flag - Single
"Surrender" (Work in Progress)	2006	Demo			Yes		D2C via Myspace
"Perfect World" (Demo)	2006	Demo			Yes		D2C via Myspace
"Cold Turkey" (John Lennon cover)	2009	Cover		Yes	Yes	Yes	Rusted from the Rain - Single
"Bloody Nails + Broken Hearts"	2009	B-Side			Yes		Billy Talent III - Japanese Edition
"Don't Need to Pretend"	2009	B-Side			Yes	Yes	Billy Talent III - Japanese Edition
Devil on My Shoulder" (Demo)	2009	Demo			Yes		Billy Talent III - Special Edition
"Tears into Wine" (Demo)	2009	Demo		Yes			Billy Talent III - Guitar Villain Edition
"White Sparrows" (Demo)	2009	Demo		Yes			Billy Talent III - Guitar Villain Edition
"Pocketful of Dreams" (Demo)	2009	Demo		Yes			Billy Talent III - Guitar Villain Edition
"Turn Your Back" (Demo)	2009	Demo		Yes			Billy Talent III - Guitar Villain Edition
"Sudden Movements" (Fil Bucchino Dub Mix)	2013	Remix	Yes				Stand Up And Run - Single
"Chasing the Sun" (Demo)	2015	Demo		Yes			The End Records Free Sampler 2015
"Half Past Dead"	2016	B-Side		Yes			Afraid of Heights - Japanese Edition
"Big Red Gun" (Demo)	2016	Demo		Yes	Yes	Yes	Afraid of Heights - Deluxe
"Afraid of Heights" (Demo)	2016	Demo		Yes	Yes	Yes	Afraid of Heights - Deluxe
"Ghost Ship of Cannibal Rats" (Demo)	2016	Demo		Yes	Yes	Yes	Afraid of Heights - Deluxe
"Louder than the DJ" (Demo)	2016	Demo		Yes	Yes	Yes	Afraid of Heights - Deluxe
"The Crutch" (Demo)	2016	Demo		Yes	Yes	Yes	Afraid of Heights - Deluxe
"Time-Bomb Ticking Away" (Demo)	2016	Demo		Yes	Yes	Yes	Afraid of Heights - Deluxe
"Leave Them All Behind" (Demo)	2016	Demo		Yes	Yes	Yes	Afraid of Heights - Deluxe
"Afraid of Heights (Reprise)" (Demo)	2016	Demo		Yes	Yes	Yes	Afraid of Heights - Deluxe
"Hey Hey, My My (Into the Black)" (Neil Young & Crazy Horse cover)	2017	Cover			Yes	Yes	Warner Music Canada : Covered in Gold 5.0 - Compilation

== Music videos ==
Year	Song Title	Song Album	Director
2003	"Try Honesty"	Billy Talent	Sean Michael Turrell
2004	"The Ex"	Billy Talent	Billy Talent & Shawn Maher
2004	"River Below"	Billy Talent	Sean Michael Turrell
2004	"Nothing to Lose"	Billy Talent	Sean Michael Turrell
2006	"Devil in a Midnight Mass"	Billy Talent II	Sean Michael Turrell
2006	"Red Flag"	Billy Talent II	Floria Sigismondi
2006	"Fallen Leaves"	Billy Talent II	Dean Karr & Ian D'Sa
2007	"Surrender"	Billy Talent II	Phil Harder
2007	"The Navy Song"	Billy Talent II	
2007	"This Suffering"	Billy Talent II	Pierre & Francois Lamoureux
2009	"Rusted From the Rain"	Billy Talent III	Wayne Isham
2009	"Devil on My Shoulder"	Billy Talent III	Howard Greenhalgh
2010	"Saint Veronika"	Billy Talent III	Michael Maxxis
2010	"Diamond on a Landmine"	Billy Talent III	Michael Maxxis
2010	"Prisoners of Today"	Billy Talent	Dustin Rabin
2012	"Viking Death March"	Dead Silence	Michael Maxxis, David Hogan
2012	"Surprise Surprise"	Dead Silence	Michael Maxxis
2013	"Stand Up and Run"	Dead Silence	Phil Harder
2013	"Show Me the Way"	Dead Silence	Alon Isocianu, Jack Kay, Chad Kroeger
2013	"Runnin' Across the Tracks"	Dead Silence	Alon Isocianu
2014	"Kingdom of Zod"	Hits	Sean Michael Turrell
2015	"Chasing the Sun"	Hits	Phil Harder
2015	"Love Was Still Around"	Dead Silence	Dustin Rabin
2016	"Afraid of Heights"	Afraid of Heights	Alon Isocianu
2016	"Louder Than the DJ"	Afraid of Heights	Aaron Solowoniuk & Dustin Rabin
2017	"Ghost Ship of Cannibal Rats"	Afraid of Heights	Jeremy Schaulin-Rioux & Sarah Legault
2021	"End Of Me"	Crisis of Faith	Liam Lynch
2024	"M&M" (Pezz)	Watoosh!	
