= I Beg to Differ (This Will Get Better) =

Single by Billy Talent

from the album Crisis of Faith
- Released: April 3, 2020
- Length: 3:37
- Label: Spinefarm, Dudebox
- Songwriters: Ben Kowalewicz, Ian D'Sa, Jonathan Gallant, Jordan Hastings
- Producer: Ian D'Sa

Billy Talent singles chronology
"Reckless Paradise" (2020)	"I Beg to Differ (This Will Get Better)" (2020)	"End of Me" (2021)

"I Beg To Differ (This Will Get Better)" is a song by Canadian punk band Billy Talent. The song was released on April 3, 2020, as the second single from their sixth album, Crisis of Faith. It eventually became the album's third single after the band chose to include a previously non-album single, "Forgiveness I + II", on Crisis of Faith. The song was written by Ben Kowalewicz, Ian D'Sa, Jonathan Gallant, and Jordan Hastings.

== Background ==
"I Beg To Differ (This Will Get Better)" originated from a collection of scratch vocals written by D'Sa. From there, the band transformed those lyrics into a motivational song addressing those close to them suffering from mental illness, and letting them know that everything is going to be alright.

"That message is really important. It was challenging to write, and we worked really hard on it. Nowadays there's a lot of artists and a lot of people saying that message in metaphor – and I love that too – but sometimes it's just nice to just hear it the way it is and be that direct: it will get better, stick through it.” - Ben Kowalewicz

== Release and reception ==
"I Beg to Differ (This Will Get Better)" was released on April 3, 2020, with many believing that it was released in response to the ongoing COVID-19 pandemic. A lyric video was also released with the song that included a list of phone numbers for crisis hotlines in 20 different countries.

The song has received mostly positive reviews, with critics praising its uplifting message. Amgad Abdelgadir of Louder Sound called the song "an uplifting belter", while Matt Bobkin of Exclaim! felt the song's message of hope fit well with the pandemic. Mark Sutherland of Kerrang! was a bit more critical of the song for its more pop-centered direction, calling it "radio-friendly sheen and pop positivity".

== Personnel ==
Billy Talent

- Ben Kowalewicz - lead vocals, songwriting
- Ian D'Sa - guitars, synthesizers, piano, backing vocals, producer
- Jonathan Gallant - bass, songwriting
- Jordan Hastings - drums, songwriting

Production

- Eric Ratz - engineering
- Ted Jensen - engineering
- Chris Lord-Alge - mixing

== Charts ==
Chart (2020)	Peak position
Canadian Digital Song Sales	34
Canada Rock Chart	1

== Certifications ==
Certifications for "I Beg to Differ (This Will Get Better)"
Region	Certification	Certified units/sales
Canada (Music Canada)	Gold	40,000^{‡}
^{‡} Sales+streaming figures based on certification alone.
