= Try Honesty (EP) =

EP by Billy Talent
- Released: 2001 (Original); November 27, 2026 (Re-issue)
- Recorded: 2001
- Studios: The Music Gym (B-Town Sound); Burlington, Ontario
- Genres: alternative rock, punk, post-hardcore, garage, grunge
- Length: 16:11
- Labels: Dudebox Records (Self-released); Dine Alone Records (Re-issue)
- Producer: Justin Koop

Billy Talent chronology
Watoosh! (as Pezz) (1999)	Try Honesty (2001)	Try Honesty / Living in the Shadows (2003)

Try Honesty is the debut EP by Canadian alternative rock band Billy Talent, released independently in 2001. The EP marks the group's first release as "Billy Talent" after rebranding from their former iteration under the name, "Pezz" in 2000.

A re-recorded version of the EP's title track would later go on to be the group's breakthrough hit a few years later, as the lead single off their self-titled debut after signing to Atlantic Records in 2003, catapulting them into mainstream prominence domestically and internationally. Since then, Billy Talent have continued to maintain their commercial longevity over the last two decades, making them one of Canada's most successful and best-selling rock groups, to date.

On October 19, 2026, the band announced the EP would receive a limited edition re-issue in Canada for Record Store Day Black Friday 2026 in commemoration of the project's 25th anniversary. The exclusive re-pressing on translucent neon green 10" vinyl will be released via Dine Alone Records.

== Background ==
Recorded and mixed by Ontario-based producer, Justin Koop, along with the band at his studio, The Music Gym (now "B-Town Sound" present day) in Burlington, Ontario, the majority of the EP showcases early versions of songs that would later be updated and appear on their self-titled debut studio album, Billy Talent in 2003.

Written and created during a period of difficulty and deep uncertainty about the band's future, Try Honesty emerged following a moment when university commitments, full-time jobs, and other life pressures were pulling members in different directions. The heaviest blow came with drummer, Aaron Solowoniuk’s recent multiple sclerosis diagnosis, which cast an even longer shadow over their momentum. Despite the turmoil, Billy Talent collectively credits the EP as the spark that reignited them. “That was a dark time… that CD, that green EP, represented the rebirth of our band.” bassist Jon Gallant recalls during the group's appearance on Canadian radio personality, Alan Cross' podcast, The Ongoing History of New Music in 2022 .

Stylistically, Try Honesty served as a musical exercise in helping Billy Talent develop a signature sound for themselves, by transitioning away from a broad range of varying styles, such as grunge, garage rock, ska, reggae and roots rock among others they previously established on their first album as Pezz, 1999's Watoosh! to taking a more focused approach and adopting the heavier, aggressive and hard-hitting aspects of alternative rock, rockabilly, punk and post-hardcore they would later become synonymous for upon their debut. While the EP would still retain some of the former's musical elements, plus a few additional ones (including slight traces of jazz and funk), they would ultimately be altered or abandoned on the studio album counterparts in favour of a streamlined version of the latter.

== Misattribution of Try Honesty EP ==
Over the years since Billy Talent gained recognition in 2003, a long-standing misconception among the group's fanbase and their discography has been the purported existence of a second, re-issued six-track version of the Try Honesty EP. In reality, the recordings in question are actually a set of fully-developed demos (which included three songs reworked from the EP) recorded in 2002. Aptly known as Industry Demo, these tracks were created exclusively for music executives and industry figures while the band pursued a major-label deal, which was achieved the following year with Atlantic and Warner Music Canada. Despite never being intended for public consumption, the material eventually leaked soon after and circulated online through early peer-sharing networks.

Much of the confusion likely stemmed from scarce information about the demo's origins, compounded by fans stumbling across the tracks in the early days of file sharing. Some even paired the American artwork from the 2003 Try Honesty single with the recordings as proof of legitimacy, inadvertently reinforcing the belief that it was a revised EP rather than an unrelated session entirely.

Eventually, the Industry Demo recordings would finally receive an official release in September 2013 as part of the group's 10th Anniversary edition of their debut album, appearing as a bonus disc alongside additional live and acoustic tracks presented in the original track sequence.

== Track listing ==
All tracks are written by Billy Talent.

No.	Title	Length
1.	"Try Honesty"	4:12
2.	"This Is How It Goes"	4:16
3.	"Cut the Curtains"	3:55
4.	"Beach Balls"	3:48
Total length:		16:11

== Personnel ==
Personnel taken from Try Honesty liner notes.

Billy Talent

- Ben Kowalewicz – lead vocals
- Ian D'Sa – guitar, rhodes (tracks 3,4), vocals
- Jon Gallant – bass, vocals
- Aaron Ess – drums, vocals

Production

- Billy Talent – recording, mixing
- Justin Koop – recording, mixing
