= Reckless Paradise =

Single by Billy Talent

from the album Crisis of Faith
- Released: January 24, 2020
- Length: 3:24
- Label: Spinefarm, Dudebox
- Songwriters: Ben Kowalewicz, Ian D'Sa, Jonathan Gallant, Jordan Hastings
- Producer: Ian D'Sa

Billy Talent singles chronology
"Forgiveness I + II" (2019)	"Reckless Paradise" (2020)	"I Beg to Differ (This Will Get Better)" (2020)

"Reckless Paradise" is a song by Canadian punk band Billy Talent. Initially released as the first single for their sixth album, Crisis of Faith, it became the album's second single after the band chose to include their previous single, "Forgiveness I + II", on Crisis of Faith.

== Background ==
"Reckless Paradise" was primarily written by vocalist, Ben Kowalewicz, and guitarist, Ian D'Sa, about the need for people to be more active in their communities during times of conflict. Kowalewicz detailed the song's message more in an interview with Kerrang!:

“We’re in a very interesting time in the world. In my 45 years on this planet, it’s never been more dangerous, volatile or divisive. The four of us are saying we need to come together and put our bullshit aside. We’re only on this planet for a short time together and we need to make sure we treat each other with respect, treat the climate with respect and also realise that the things we’re being sold as truth are not always right. We get a lot of, ‘You’re a political band!’ – we’re not necessarily a political band, but we are socially-minded. This is past the point of left or right-leaning politics.” - Ben Kowalewicz

== Release and reception ==
"Reckless Paradise" was released on January 24, 2020, with the intention of it being the first single for Crisis of Faith when the album was still set to release that fall. When the album was postponed to 2022, the band chose to include their previous non-album single "Forgiveness I + II" on Crisis of Faith, technically making "Reckless Paradise" the second released single from the album.

Upon release, "Reckless Paradise" was met with mostly positive review. Rob Sayce of Rock Sound called the song "Powerful", while Kaitlin Milligan of Broadway World felt the song delivered "the powerful driving riffs and pointed lyrics the band is famous for." Alternative Press' Koltan Greenwood called the song "a school lesson in melodic yet powerful riffs and supreme vocal range."

== Music video ==
A music video was released alongside "Reckless Paradise" as part of the band's Forgiveness short film series. The video has since been removed from YouTube, but the band also uploaded a lyric video to the website as well.

== Personnel ==
Billy Talent

- Ben Kowalewicz - lead vocals, songwriting
- Ian D'Sa - guitars, synthesizers, piano, backing vocals, producer
- Jonathan Gallant - bass, songwriting
- Jordan Hastings - drums, songwriting

Production

- Eric Ratz - engineering
- Ted Jensen - engineering
- Chris Lord-Alge - mixing

== Charts ==
Chart (2020)	Peak position
Canadian Digital Song Sales	46
Canada Rock Chart	1

== Certifications ==
Certifications for "Reckless Paradise"
Region	Certification	Certified units/sales
Canada (Music Canada)	Platinum	80,000^{‡}
^{‡} Sales+streaming figures based on certification alone.
