= Song for Africa =

Song for Africa (SFA) is a Canadian non-profit organization founded in 2006 by music and movie producer Darcy Ataman. Participants in the Song for Africa Music Enrichment Program learn how to write, perform, produce, and disseminate their music on the local radio. Song for Africa is currently working in Kenya, Rwanda, and the Democratic Republic of the Congo.

== History ==
In the spring of 2006 several Canadian musicians came together to write and record the single Song for Africa to raise awareness of the AIDS pandemic in Africa. Following the premiere at the International AIDS Conference in Toronto, the non-profit organization ‘Song for Africa’ (SFA) emerged as a way for participating artists to further promote efforts in the fight against HIV/AIDS.

In partnership with Free The Children and CARE Kenya, the first Song for Africa documentary captured everyday stories of communities affected by HIV/AIDS. The film featured Ian D'Sa (Billy Talent), Damhnait Doyle, Luke McMaster and Simon Wilcox, who traveled to Kenya in the summer of 2007.

A second documentary in 2009, Rwanda: Rises Up!, focused on the resilience of the Rwandan nation and the progress made since the genocide in 1994. The accompanying full-length album (released by Sony Music) featured Canadian artists including Sarah Slean, Steve Bays (Hot Hot Heat), Damhnait Doyle and Tim Edwards (Crash Parallel) who participated in the film, as well as Ian D'Sa (Billy Talent), Cone McCaslin (Sum 41/Operation MD), Classified, and The Trews.

Darcy Ataman has continued to travel to Rwanda and more recently to the Democratic Republic of the Congo in order to develop partnerships for the Song for Africa Music Enrichment Program. Potential partnerships with programs working with child soldiers together with Roméo Dallaire's Child Soldier Initiative have been explored, as well as one with the Panzi Hospital.

== Documentaries ==
- Song for Africa
- Rwanda: Rises Up!!

== Albums ==
- A Song for Africa
- Rwanda: Rises Up!

== Partners ==
- Canadian International Development Agency
- The University of Winnipeg Global College
- Child Soldiers Initiative
- MetalWorks Institute of Sound and Music Production
- Uyisenga N'Manzi
- Slaight Communications

== Artists ==
- Billy Talent (Ian D'Sa)
- Operation M.D/Sum 41 (Cone McCaslin)
- Hot Hot Heat (Steve Bays)
- Damhnait Doyle
- The Trews
- Barenaked Ladies
- Alexisonfire
- Crash Parallel
- Chantal Kreviazuk
- The Weakerthans
- Luke McMaster
- Choclair
- Thornley
- Simon Wilcox
- Grand Analog
- Noble Blood
- Saint Alvia
- Big Sugar
- Eva Availia
- Ill Scarlet
- Faber Drive
- The Agonist
- SBT
- Rafiki
- K-8
- Miss JoJo
- Itorero
- Holy Jah Doves
- Mike Boyd
- Queen Gaga And The Heaveners
- White Mic
