= Forgiveness I + II =

2019 single by Billy Talent

"Forgiveness I"

Single by Billy Talent

from the album Crisis of Faith
- Released: November 26, 2019
- Genre: Progressive metal; progressive rock; rock; punk rock
- Length: 3:45
- Label: Spinefarm
- Songwriters: Ben Kowalewicz; Ian D'Sa; Jonathan Gallant; Jordan Hastings
- Producer: Ian D'Sa

Billy Talent singles chronology
"Ghost Ship of Cannibal Rats" (2016)	"Forgiveness I" (2019)	"Forgiveness II" (2019)

"Forgiveness II"

Single by Billy Talent

from the album Crisis of Faith
- Released: November 26, 2019
- Genre: Progressive metal; progressive rock; rock; punk rock
- Length: 2:57
- Label: Spinefarm
- Songwriters: Ben Kowalewicz; Ian D'Sa; Jonathan Gallant; Jordan Hastings
- Producer: Ian D'Sa

Billy Talent singles chronology
"Forgiveness I" (2019)	"Forgiveness II" (2019)	"Reckless Paradise" (2020)

"Forgiveness I and Forgiveness II" are two songs by Canadian punk band Billy Talent. The songs were initially released on November 26, 2019, as two standalone singles, but were eventually included as the first two singles on their sixth album, Crisis of Faith. The songs were written by Ben Kowalewicz, Ian D'Sa, Jonathan Gallant, and Jordan Hastings.

== Background ==
The two songs are broken into two parts; the first being "a badass, heavy, prog song", as Kowalewicz describes it, followed by a softer song that incorporate a horns section alongside the band. Part I was primarily written by D'Sa, which evoked feelings of "riding through a desert on horseback" from the rest of the band. Eventually taking inspiration from Paulo Coelho's novel, The Alchemist, the band leaned into these feelings more as they continued to develop the song. Kowalewicz described Part II as having more of a space rock feel to it, specifically comparing it to Pink Floyd.

== Release and reception ==
"Forgiveness I" and "Forgiveness II" released on November 26, 2019, alongside a lyric video. Following the songs' release, it was revealed that they would not appear on the band's next album, however, they were included in the track listing for Crisis of Faith when the album was announced in 2021.

The songs were met with mostly positive feedback, with many critics praising the guitars and vocals of the first the song. Ben Rayner of Toronto Star compared them to Rush, calling them "a multi-staged metallo-prog epic", and the band's most ambitious songs to date. Mark Sutherland of Kerrang! called the two songs a "six-minute prog rock odyssey", favorably comparing them to Muse for their electronic riffs.

== Short film ==
Alongside "Forgiveness I" and "Forgiveness II", the band partnered with Canadian director Michael Maxxis on a short film titled Forgiveness. The film stars UFC fighters Rose Namajunas and Donald Cerrone, and is set is a dystopian desert. The film was originally released in three parts on the band's YouTube channel, but the videos were later removed ahead of the film's premiere at the Santa Fe International Film Festival on October 21, 2022. The first two episodes break the songs into their respective parts, while the third episode uses the band's following single, "Reckless Paradise".

== Personnel ==
Billy Talent

- Ben Kowalewicz – lead vocals, songwriting
- Ian D'Sa – guitars, synthesizers, piano, backing vocals, producer
- Jonathan Gallant – bass, songwriting
- Jordan Hastings – drums, songwriting

Additional musician

- Dennis Passley – tenor saxophone
- Bruce Mackinnon – alto saxophone
- Ernesto Barahona – trombone
- Tom Moffet – trumpet

Production

- Rich Costey – mixing
- Eric Ratz – engineering
- Ted Jensen – mastering

== Charts ==
Chart performance for "Forgiveness I" and "Forgiveness II"
Chart (2019)	Peak position
ERROR in "Billboardcanadarock": Invalid position: 40 (both songs combined). Expected number 1–200 or dash (–).
