= End of Me (Billy Talent song) =

Single by Billy Talent featuring Rivers Cuomo

from the album Crisis of Faith
- Released: September 10, 2021
- Length: 3:46
- Label: Spinefarm
- Songwriters: Ben Kowalewicz, Ian D'Sa, Jonathan Gallant, Jordan Hastings, Rivers Cuomo
- Producer: Ian D'Sa

Billy Talent singles chronology
"I Beg to Differ (This Will Get Better)" (2020)	"End of Me" (2021)	"The Wolf" (2022)

"End of Me" is a song by Canadian punk band Billy Talent. It was released on September 10, 2021 as the fourth single for their sixth album, Crisis of Faith, and features Weezer frontman, Rivers Cuomo, on guest vocals. The song was written by Ben Kowalewicz, Ian D'Sa, Jonathan Gallant, Jordan Hastings, and Cuomo.

== Background ==
Billy Talent cites the first half of the 1990s as one of the most influential eras of music for them, specifically noting Weezer's Blue Album. While writing "End of Me", Kowalewicz and D'Sa felt that the song combined elements of Weezer (specifically listing Pinkerton) with John Frusciante and Jimi Hendrix, and even went as far as to call the song "Hendrix+Weezer" before giving it an official name. Eventually, they asked Cuomo to sing on the song, to which he agreed:

"We tracked it, mixed it and mastered it… And a couple months later, I was like, 'Nope, every time I hear it, I hear Rivers singing on it – we have to get him on this song.' And we've never met Rivers! Our manager gave his manager the song, and about a month later, we found out that he loved it and was happy to be part of it. He sent it back like BAM!" - Ben Kowalewicz

Lyrically, the song addresses standing by your loved ones, regardless of the negative impacts they can sometimes have on your life.

== Release and reception ==
"End of Me" released alongside the announcement of Crisis of Faith on September 10, 2021. The song topped the Canadian Rock Chart, and remained there for 12 weeks, making it the longest any of their singles have stayed at No. 1.

Critically, the song was met mostly positive feedback. Jack Rogers of Rock Sound called it "a classic piece of quirk-filled rock and roll that Billy Talent produce so wonderfully," while Matt Doria of NME praised D'Sa's guitar playing, calling the main riff "fierce, if somewhat pared-back." Matt Parker of Guitar World praised the song's ability to channel both The Blue Album and Jimi Hendrix, specifically mentioning the latter's song, "Hey Joe."

== Music video ==
A music video for "End of Me" was released on September 27, 2021. The video shows likenesses of Kowalewicz and Cuomo, but with bare skulls in place of their heads, as they endures various life-threatening situations. These include getting stuck in a spiderweb, being surrounded by explosives, trapped in various torture devices, and more. The video was created by Liam Lynch, who also portrays Kowalewicz, Cuomo, and the other various characters.

== Personnel ==
Billy Talent

- Ben Kowalewicz - lead vocals, songwriting
- Ian D'Sa - guitars, synthesizers, piano, backing vocals, producer
- Jonathan Gallant - bass, songwriting
- Jordan Hastings - drums, songwriting

Additional musicians

- Rivers Cuomo - vocals

Production

- Eric Ratz - engineering
- Ted Jensen - engineering
- Chris Lord-Alge - mixing

== Charts ==
Chart (2020)	Peak position
Canada Rock Chart	1

== Certifications ==
Certifications for Crisis of Faith
Region	Certification	Certified units/sales
Canada (Music Canada)	Gold	40,000^{‡}
^{‡} Sales+streaming figures based on certification alone.
