= Song for Africa – Rwanda: Rises Up! =

Song for Africa - Rwanda: Rises Up!

Compilation album by Various Artists
- Released: June 15, 2010
- Recorded: Early 2010
- Genre: Folk, folk rock, alternative rock, hip hop
- Length: 45:22
- Label: Song for Africa

Song for Africa – Rwanda: Rises Up! is a Canadian charity album by the Song for Africa organization. The album is an accompanying soundtrack to the charity fund's latest Rwanda documentary which documents the visit to Rwanda by the Canadian super group of Steve Bays of Hot Hot Heat, Tim Edwards of Crash Parallel, Sarah Slean, Damhnait Doyle and John-Angus MacDonald of the Trews. Other Canadian artists featured on the album include Ian D'Sa of Billy Talent, Operation M.D., Classified, Luke McMaster, Mike Boyd, White Mic and Grand Analog.

The album was recorded in early 2010, and was released on iTunes only on June 15, 2010, following the release of the documentary on June 12, 2010.

== Track listing ==
No.	Title	Performing artist	Length
1.	"1000 Bananas"	Steve Bays	3:04
2.	"Beautiful"	Tim Edwards	3:10
3.	"Komera"	Damhnait Doyle	3:10
4.	"Not for Sale"	Sarah Slean	3:50
5.	"Canada to Kigali"	Damhnait Doyle, Tim Edwards, Sarah Slean, Steve Bays and Grand Analog	3:53
6.	"Trying to Make It Work"	Classified, Mike Boyd and White Mic	4:01
7.	"Land of a Thousand Hills"	Ian D'Sa and Noble Blood	3:36
8.	"Carry You"	Luke McMaster	4:30
9.	"We Stand"	The Operation M.D.	2:57
10.	"Yearning" (Instrumental)	John-Angus MacDonald	3:38
11.	"Amazing Grace"	Damhnait Doyle, Tim Edwards, Sarah Slean and Steve Bays	3:56
