= Afraid of Heights =

Afraid of Heights may refer to:

- Afraid of Heights (Wavves album), and title track on that album
- Afraid of Heights (Billy Talent album), 2016
  - "Afraid of Heights" (song), the title track from the album above
- Afraid of Heights, a mixtape by Omen
