= Dudebox =

EP by Pezz
- Released: January 1995
- Recorded: Signal to Noise Studios, Toronto, 1995
- Genre: Rapcore, alternative rock
- Length: 13:14
- Label: Self-released
- Producer: Pezz

Pezz chronology
Demoluca (1994)	Dudebox (1995)	Watoosh! (1999)

Dudebox is seven-song EP cassette tape released by Canadian rock band Billy Talent, under their previous name Pezz, in January 1995. It was a follow-up to their previous release, Demoluca. The decision to spend money for a professional recording by Dave Tedesco at Toronto's Signal to Noise studio enhanced Pezz' sound dramatically. The EP led the way to the band's 1999 underground breakthrough full-length album Watoosh!

== Track listing ==
All tracks are written by Pezz

First edition
No.	Title	Length
1.	"Dudebox"	3:42
2.	"Tuner"	3:07
3.	"Happy"	3:39
4.	"You're It" (Remix)	3:25

Side A
No.	Title	Length
1.	"Just a Thought"
2.	"You're It"
3.	"Things"
4.	"Tuner"

Side B
No.	Title	Length
1.	"Dudebox"
2.	"Warmth of Windows"
3.	"Point Proven"
4.	"New Orleans Is Sinking"
5.	"Dudebox" (Live)

== Personnel ==
- Benjamin Kowalewicz – lead vocals
- Ian D'Sa – lead guitar, vocals
- Jonathan Gallant – bass, backing vocals
- Aaron Solowoniuk – drums, percussion

== Trivia ==
- "You're It (Remix)" is the only Pezz song that does not feature guitars, only a sampled drum loop and piano are used.
