= Scandalous Travelers =

Video by Billy Talent
- Released: January 4, 2005
- Recorded: London, Ontario/various; 2002–2004
- Length: 58 minutes
- Label: Warner Music Canada; Atlantic
- Director: Sean Conly
- Producer: Steve Blair

Billy Talent chronology
Scandalous Travelers (2005)	666 (2007)

Scandalous Travelers is a DVD by Canadian rock band Billy Talent. It is a documentary which follows the band's first two-year tour. It includes live footage of Edgefest and various radio station interviews in London, Ontario. The DVD holds bonus material which features live performances of "This Is How It Goes," "Cut The Curtains", "Line and Sinker", "Living In The Shadows", and rare acoustic sets of "Standing In The Rain," "Lies" and "Try Honesty." On December 7, 2004, the DVD sold over 10,000 in Canada, earning Platinum clarification by "CRIA".
