= Afraid of Heights (song) =

Single by Billy Talent

from the album Afraid of Heights
- Released: May 12, 2016
- Genre: Alternative rock, punk rock, post-hardcore, emo
- Length: 3:45
- Label: Warner Music Canada
- Composer: Ian D'Sa
- Lyricists: Ian D'Sa; Ben Kowalewicz

Billy Talent singles chronology
"Kingdom of Zod" (2014)	"Afraid of Heights" (2016)	"Louder Than the DJ" (2016)

"Afraid of Heights" is the first single by Billy Talent from their fifth studio album of the same name. It was released on May 12, 2016. The song was released first for radio play on 102.1 The Edge, followed by an exclusive stream through Alternative Press, followed by a wide release on YouTube, iTunes, Spotify and other digital retailers, a day later, on May 13, at midnight.

An official lyric video for the song was released through the band's official YouTube channel on June 15, 2016. The lyric video was designed and animated by Peter J. Arvidsson. The song is also featured in the soundtrack for the 2020 video game Tony Hawk's Pro Skater 1 + 2.

The band debuted the song live on May 29, 2016, during their performance at the Anabuk Festival in Moscow, Russia, the band's first tour date of 2016. During the same performance, the band debuted two other new songs: "Louder Than the DJ" and "Big Red Gun", which were not officially released at that point.

== Chart performance ==
In 2016, "Afraid of Heights" peaked at #1 on the Billboard Canada Rock chart.

== Certifications ==
Region	Certification	Certified units/sales
Canada (Music Canada)	Platinum	80,000^{‡}
^{‡} Sales+streaming figures based on certification alone.
