= Crisis of Faith (album) =

Studio album by Billy Talent
- Released: January 21, 2022
- Studios: Dudebox, Toronto; Revolution Recording, Toronto; Ocean Way, Nashville
- Length: 36:42
- Label: Spinefarm
- Producer: Ian D'Sa

Billy Talent chronology
Afraid of Heights (2016)	Crisis of Faith (2022)	Live At Festhalle Frankfurt (2023)

Singles from Crisis of Faith
- 1. "Forgiveness I" Released: November 26, 2019; 2. "Forgiveness II" Released: November 26, 2019; 3. "Reckless Paradise" Released: January 24, 2020; 4. "I Beg to Differ (This Will Get Better)" Released: April 3, 2020; 5. "End of Me" Released: September 10, 2021; 6. "The Wolf" Released: April 2, 2022

Professional ratings
Aggregate scores
Source	Rating
Metacritic	76/100
Review scores
Source	Rating
AllMusic	4/5 stars
Classic Rock	3.5/5 stars
Kerrang!	4/5
Sputnikmusic	2.3/5

Crisis of Faith is the sixth studio album by Canadian rock band Billy Talent, released on January 21, 2022, through Spinefarm Records. It was preceded by five singles; "Forgiveness I + II" "Reckless Paradise", "I Beg to Differ (This Will Get Better)", "End of Me" featuring Rivers Cuomo of Weezer, and "The Wolf". The album had particular success on the charts in German-speaking Europe, debuting at number one in Germany and Switzerland, and number two in Austria.

== Critical reception ==
Crisis of Faith received a score of 76 out of 100 based on five critics' reviews on review aggregator Metacritic, indicating "generally favorable" reception. Neil Z. Yeung of AllMusic described the album as "ten tracks of cathartic release and hardened hope from a band still digesting the chaotic years between releases". Highlighting "Forgiveness I + II" for being a "two-part prog exercise" and "one of the most daring and satisfying creative moves in their decades-long career", Yeung characterised "the rest of the set" as "fairly standard Billy Talent fare, with snaking riffs and pounding drums".

Amgad Abdelgadir of Classic Rock gave the album three-and-a-half stars out of five and also reserved praise for "Forgiveness I + II" for Ian D'Sa's "nimble guitar licks weaving masterfully through Ben Kowalewicz's soaring vibrato".

Reviewing the album for Kerrang!, Mark Sutherland wrote that it is "no surprise" that on first listen it "seems to be all over the place", "but dig deeper and you'll find that [... the album] manages to subtly shift its protagonists into the modern age, while retaining just the right amount of callbacks to former glories".

Sputnikmusic staff writer Asleep reserved particular criticism for "End of Me" for containing a "Weezer cameo" and "sound[ing] like [a] Bowling For Soup knockoff", ultimately summarising the album as not living up to the high bar set by their previous material, dismissing it as "a trite, inconsistent, waste of a record that isn't worth your time, your patience or your money".

== Track listing ==
All tracks are written by Billy Talent.

Crisis of Faith track listing
No.	Title	Length
1.	"Forgiveness I"	3:45
2.	"Forgiveness II"	2:57
3.	"Reckless Paradise"	3:24
4.	"I Beg to Differ (This Will Get Better)"	3:36
5.	"The Wolf"	3:47
6.	"Reactor"	3:49
7.	"Judged"	1:39
8.	"Hanging Out with All the Wrong People"	3:46
9.	"End of Me" (featuring Rivers Cuomo)	3:45
10.	"One Less Problem"	3:03
11.	"For You"	3:12
Total length:		36:42

== Personnel ==
Credits adapted from the album's liner notes.

Billy Talent

- Ben Kowalewicz – lead vocals
- Ian D'Sa – guitar, backing vocals, piano, synthesizers, percussion
- Jon Gallant – bass, backing vocals
- Jordan Hastings – drums, percussion
- Aaron Solowoniuk – "good vibes" (Note: Solowoniuk did not perform on the album, but was still credited as a member of the band.)

Additional personnel

- Rivers Cuomo – additional vocals on "End of Me"
- Dennis Passley – tenor saxophone on "Forgiveness I + II"
- Ernesto Barahona – trombone on "Forgiveness I + II"
- Bruce Mackinnon – alto saxophone on "Forgiveness I + II"
- Tom Moffet – trumpet on "Forgiveness I + II"
- David Campbell – orchestra arrangement and conductor on "The Wolf"
- Alan Umstead, Catherine Umstead, Mary Kathryn VanOsdale, Janet Darnall, Karen Winkelmann, Bruce Wethey, Kimberly Yokoyama, Carrie Bailey – violin on "The Wolf"
- Elizabeth Lamb, Bruce Christensen, Clare Yang – viola on "The Wolf"
- Anthony LaMarchina, Andrew Dunn, Elizabeth Browne, Alex Krew – cello on "The Wolf"
- Craig Nelson, Quentin Flowers – double bass on "The Wolf"

Production

- Ian D'Sa – producer
- Chris Lord-Alge – mixing
- Rich Costey – mixing on "Forgiveness I + II"
- Eric Ratz – engineering
- Kenny Luong – engineering
- Ted Jensen – mastering
- Luke Schindler – engineering assistance (Revolution Recording)
- Nick Spezia – orchestra engineering on "The Wolf"
- Austin Atwood – orchestra engineering assistance on "The Wolf"

Design

- Ryan Quickfall – album artwork
- Antje Schroeder – art layout, package design

== Charts ==
Chart performance for Crisis of Faith
Chart (2022)	Peak position
Austrian Albums (Ö3 Austria)	2
Canadian Albums (Billboard)	8
German Albums (Offizielle Top 100)	1
Hungarian Albums (MAHASZ)	15
Scottish Albums (Official Charts)	63
Swiss Albums (Schweizer Hitparade)	1
UK Albums Sales (OCC)	38
UK Rock & Metal Albums (Official Charts)	3

== Certifications ==
Certifications for Crisis of Faith
Region	Certification	Certified units/sales
Canada (Music Canada)	Gold	40,000^{‡}
^{‡} Sales+streaming figures based on certification alone.
