= 666 (Billy Talent album) =

666 Live
- Cover to the standard edition of the album

Live album / DVD by Billy Talent
- Released: November 27, 2007
- Recorded: February–June 2007
- Genres: Alternative rock, pop-punk, punk rock, post-hardcore
- Label: Atlantic
- Producers: Pierre Lamoureux, Francois Lamoureux

Billy Talent chronology
| Live from the UK Sept./2006 (2006) | 666 Live (2007) | Billy Talent III (2009) |

666 Live is a 2007 live CD/DVD album by Canadian rock band Billy Talent. It has three of the band's European performances from their past tour, which took them around the globe multiple times over eighteen months in support of their latest studio album Billy Talent II. The basic version includes footage of six songs each from the shows at London's Brixton Academy, Düsseldorf's Philips Halle and Germany's Rock Am Ring Festival (at the Nürburgring). A second disc has the audio portion of the entire Düsseldorf concert. The deluxe edition is a 2-DVD/CD that expands the shows on two DVDs. The album is produced by Pierre and Francois Lamoureux, who have worked with The Tragically Hip and The Who.

== Track listing ==
=== Basic version ===
Live DVD

Performances at Brixton Academy, London

1. This Is How It Goes
2. Devil in a Midnight Mass
3. This Suffering
4. Standing in the Rain
5. Navy Song
6. Worker Bees

Performances at the Phillipshalle, Düsseldorf

1. Line & Sinker
2. The Ex
3. Surrender
4. Prisoners of Today
5. River Below
6. Red Flag

Performances at the Rock Am Ring Festival, Nürburgring

1. Perfect World
2. Sympathy
3. Try Honesty
4. Nothing to Lose
5. Fallen Leaves
6. Red Flag

Live CD

Live at the Phillipshalle in Düsseldorf

1. This Is How It Goes
2. Devil in a Midnight Mass
3. This Suffering
4. Line & Sinker
5. Standing in the Rain
6. The Navy Song
7. Worker Bees
8. The Ex
9. Surrender
10. Prisoners of Today
11. River Below
12. Perfect World
13. Sympathy
14. Try Honesty
15. Nothing to Lose
16. Fallen Leaves
17. Red Flag

=== Deluxe version ===
Brixton DVD

1. This Is How It Goes
2. Devil in a Midnight Mass
3. This Suffering
4. Line & Sinker
5. Standing in the Rain
6. The Navy Song
7. Worker Bees
8. The Ex
9. Surrender
10. Prisoners of Today
11. Fallen Leaves
12. Perfect World
13. Sympathy
14. Try Honesty
15. Nothing to Lose
16. River Below
17. Red Flag

Düsseldorf DVD

1. This Is How It Goes
2. Devil in a Midnight Mass
3. This Suffering
4. Line & Sinker
5. Standing in the Rain
6. The Navy Song
7. Worker Bees
8. The Ex
9. Surrender
10. Prisoners of Today
11. River Below
12. Perfect World
13. Sympathy
14. Try Honesty
15. Nothing to Lose
16. Fallen Leaves
17. Red Flag

Live CD

Live at the Phillipshalle in Düsseldorf

1. This Is How It Goes
2. Devil in a Midnight Mass
3. This Suffering
4. Line & Sinker
5. Standing in the Rain
6. The Navy Song
7. Worker Bees
8. The Ex
9. Surrender
10. Prisoners of Today
11. River Below
12. Perfect World
13. Sympathy
14. Try Honesty
15. Nothing to Lose
16. Fallen Leaves
17. Red Flag

The Deluxe edition also includes a hidden video on the disc which can be accessed on the very first menu when This Suffering is playing. On one of the cards a symbol turns yellow and you have to quickly press play because the menu is only short. The video shows Ian D'Sa doing his hair before a concert. Another bonus feature is photos of the band on and off stage. There are also videos in between concerts of Brixton, Düsseldorf and Nuremberg. They also talk about their former band Pezz and how they held shows. The Basic Version Contains just the Live CD.

== Charts ==
| Chart (2007) | Peak position |
|---|---|
| Austrian Albums (Ö3 Austria) | 17 |
| German Albums (Offizielle Top 100) | 31 |

== Certifications ==
Certifications for 666
| Region | Certification | Certified units/sales |
|---|---|---|
| Canada (Music Canada) | 2× Platinum | 200,000^{‡} |
^{‡} Sales+streaming figures based on certification alone.

== Awards ==
The album/DVD won a Juno Award for Music DVD of the Year on April 5, 2008.
