= Cunter (band) =

Canadian hardcore punk band

- Also known as: Hunter
- Origin: Brampton, Ontario, Canada
- Genre: Hardcore punk
- Years active: 2009–present
- Labels: New Damage, Dine Alone
- Members: Kenny Bridges; Billy Curtiss; Greg Dawson; Jordan Hastings; Erik Hughes

Cunter (formerly known as Hunter) is a five-piece hardcore punk supergroup from Brampton, Ontario, whose members are from Moneen, Alexisonfire, BWC Studios, and The Abandoned Hearts Club. The band motto is "All intensity, all the time," and they are known for short, ferociously intense songs.

== History ==
Kenny Bridges and Erik Hughes are both members of the rock band Moneen. Hughes, Bridges told an interviewer, "has a great scream" and they, along with BWC Studios producer Greg Dawson, mused about starting a punk rock band, as a side project. On November 1, 2009, Bridges called Dawson to say that they should go ahead, and found that Dawson had already written nine songs. Bridges wrote the tenth; Hughes wrote the lyrics in one evening. They recruited two friends: Alexisonfire drummer Jordan Hastings and The Abandoned Hearts Club guitarist Billy Curtiss.

When they couldn't come up with a name, they borrowed the name of Hughes' son and called the band 'Hunter'. A Polish band with the same name threatened to sue so, as of May 11, 2011, the band's name became Cunter.

The band's first EPs were released on 7-inch vinyl by Dine Alone Records. They name their releases according to the number of songs they've recorded; their first EPs were 4, and 8. In 2010, they released their first full-length CD, 10 and, in 2011, 20 (sometimes seen with the sub-title 'Some Really Nice Guy Threatened To Sue Us And Made Us Change Our Name'). In 2013, they released 27, this time on New Damage Records.

Cunter played most of its shows in and around Toronto; they've played club dates and took part in the 2011 Warped Tour.

The band has been inactive since 2013. In 2020, Jordan Hastings said that this is because everyone's so busy, but that he would like to make another Cunter album.

== Members ==
- Kenny Bridges – bass, originally from Moneen
- Billy Curtiss – guitar, originally from The Abandoned Hearts Club
- Greg Dawson – guitar, originally from Haitian Knife Fight / BWC Studios
- Jordan Hastings – drums, originally from Alexisonfire
- Erik Hughes – vocals, originally from Moneen

== Live members ==
- George Pettit – vocals, originally from Alexisonfire
- Aaron Wolff – vocals, originally from the End
- Chris "Hippy" Hughes – guitar, originally from Moneen

== Discography ==
Date of release	Title	Record label	Pressing	Notes
June 16, 2009	4	Dine Alone Records	502 / Black	
September 8, 2009	8	Dine Alone Records	505 / Black	
April 17, 2010	10	Dine Alone Records	300 / CD	Ltd Record Store Day release
June 13, 2011	20	Dine Alone Records		
June 25, 2013	27	New Damage Records		
