= Watoosh! =

Studio album by Pezz
- Released: July 23, 1999
- Recorded: 1999 in Mississauga, Ontario
- Genre: Punk rock; ska; funk; hip-hop
- Length: 42:54
- Label: Self-released; Atlantic (re-release)
- Producer: Pezz; Daryl Smith; Brad "Merlin" Nelson

Pezz chronology
Dudebox (1995)	Watoosh! (1999)	Try Honesty EP (2001)

Watoosh! is the only studio album released by Canadian rock band Pezz, released in 1999 before they changed their name to Billy Talent. The sound was described as a varied mix of punk, ska, funk and hip-hop, and as less focused than later releases by the band.

The album was re-released in 2005 through Atlantic Records. It was remastered and re-released again on May 31, 2024, and released on vinyl for the first time on December 20, 2024.

== Track listing ==
All tracks are written by Pezz, except where noted.

No.	Title	Length
1.	"M & M"	4:15
2.	"Fairytale"	4:21
3.	"Nita"	4:51
4.	"Mother's Native Instrument"	4:55
5.	"Bird in the Basement"	3:44
6.	"Recap"	3:40
7.	"When I Was a Little Girl"	2:04
8.	"Warmth of Windows"	3:03
9.	"Square Root of Me"	3:57
10.	"Absorbed"	5:22
11.	"Silence"	0:07
12.	"Silence"	0:08
13.	"Organ interlude"	0:33
14.	"Silence"	0:14
15.	"Silence"	0:12
16.	"Silence"	0:14
17.	"New Orleans Is Sinking" (The Tragically Hip cover)	1:14

- Track 13 is an instrumental, while tracks 11, 12 and 14–16 are blank.
- The track "M & M" is about a group of gothic kids that used to come into the HMV where Benjamin Kowalewicz worked.

== Personnel ==
Pezz

- Benjamin Kowalewicz – vocals
- Ian D'Sa – guitar, piano, backing vocals, cover art
- Jonathan Gallant – bass
- Aaron Solowoniuk – drums

Production

- Pezz – production; mixing
- Brad "Merlin" Nelson – production; recording and engineering (all except 5), mixing (2)
- Daryl Smith – production; mixing (all except 2), engineering (3–10)
- Mark Erlenmeyer – engineering (all except 5)
- Brett Zilahi – mastering

== See also ==
- Dudebox, a seven-track EP by Pezz
