= Afraid of Heights (Billy Talent album) =

Studio album by Billy Talent
- Released: July 29, 2016
- Recorded: January–April 2016
- Studios: Revolution Recording, Toronto and Dudebox Studios, Toronto
- Genres: Alternative rock; punk rock; post-hardcore
- Length: 48:54
- Labels: Warner; The End
- Producer: Ian D'Sa

Billy Talent chronology
Hits (2014)	Afraid of Heights (2016)	Crisis of Faith (2022)

Singles from Afraid of Heights
- 1. "Afraid of Heights" Released: May 12, 2016; 2. "Louder than the DJ" Released: June 3, 2016; 3. "Ghost Ship of Cannibal Rats" Released: July 27, 2016

Professional ratings
Review scores
Source	Rating
AllMusic	4/5 stars

Afraid of Heights is the fifth studio album by the Canadian rock band Billy Talent, released on July 29, 2016. It is the band's first album in four years following 2012's Dead Silence.

It is the first album recorded without drummer Aaron Solowoniuk who had suffered a multiple sclerosis relapse and had to take a hiatus from recording and performing to focus on his health. Jordan Hastings of Alexisonfire and Say Yes recorded the drums for the album and played on the supporting tour. The album sold approximately 53,000 units in its first week.

== Recording and release ==
On January 5, 2016, the band posted a photo of a Condenser microphone on their Facebook page, with the caption "It begins", alluding to the beginning of the recording for the album. On January 15, 2016, drummer Aaron Solowoniuk announced through a YouTube video that he would not be able to play drums for the foreseeable future due to a multiple sclerosis relapse. He also announced that Alexisonfire drummer, Jordan Hastings, would be recording the new album with the band, as well as performing on the tour supporting the album, though Solowoniuk would still be in the studio with the band and involved in a smaller capacity.

On May 12, 2016, the band released the first single off the album – "Afraid of Heights", for free streaming on Alternative Press. A day later, the single was released through YouTube, iTunes, Spotify and other digital retailers.

On June 3, 2016, the band released a lyric video for the album's second single – "Louder than the DJ". The song was performed live for the first time, a few days earlier, along with the first single "Afraid of Heights" and another new song – "Big Red Gun", on the band's first tour date of 2016, at the Anabuk Festival in Moscow, Russia.

On July 21, 2016, the band released the official music video for the first single off the album, "Afraid of Heights". It was directed by Alon Isocianu, and is the band's first video featuring Hastings on drums.

On August 11, 2016, the band released the official music video for the second single, "Louder than the DJ". directed by Solowoniuk and the band's principal photographer Dustin Rabin.

== Track listing ==
All lyrics are written by Ian D'Sa and Ben Kowalewicz; all music is composed by D'Sa.

Standard edition
No.	Title	Length
1.	"Big Red Gun"	3:17
2.	"Afraid of Heights"	3:45
3.	"Ghost Ship of Cannibal Rats"	3:39
4.	"Louder than the DJ"	3:21
5.	"The Crutch"	4:15
6.	"Rabbit Down the Hole"	6:03
7.	"Time-Bomb Ticking Away"	3:22
8.	"Leave Them All Behind"	4:53
9.	"Horses & Chariots"	3:35
10.	"This Is Our War"	4:02
11.	"February Winds"	4:19
12.	"Afraid of Heights (Reprise)"	4:23
Total length:		48:54

Japanese edition bonus track
No.	Title	Length
13.	"Half Past Dead"	3:28
Total length:		52:22

Deluxe edition bonus disc
No.	Title	Length
1.	"Big Red Gun" (Demo Version)	3:17
2.	"Afraid of Heights" (Demo Version)	3:45
3.	"Ghost Ship of Cannibal Rats" (Demo Version)	3:41
4.	"Louder than the DJ" (Demo Version)	3:26
5.	"The Crutch" (Demo Version)	4:15
6.	"Time-Bomb Ticking Away" (Demo Version)	3:24
7.	"Leave Them All Behind" (Demo Version)	4:52
8.	"Afraid of Heights (Reprise)" (Demo Version)	4:23
Total length:		1:20:57

== Personnel ==
Personnel taken from Afraid of Heights liner notes.

Billy Talent

- Ben Kowalewicz – lead vocals
- Ian D'Sa – guitar, backing vocals, piano, programming, additional percussion, production
- Jon Gallant – bass, backing vocals
- Jordan Hastings – drums, percussion
- Aaron Solowoniuk – drums (only on "Leave Them All Behind (demo version)"

Additional personnel

- Eric Ratz – engineering
- Kenny Luong – digital engineering
- Chris Lord-Alge – mixing (all tracks except track 2)
- Rich Costey – mixing (track 2)
- Nik Karpen – assistant mix engineering (all tracks except track 2)
- Martin Cooke – assistant mix engineering (track 2)
- Ted Jensen – mastering
- Luke Schindler – assistant recording engineering (Revolution Recording)
- Ryan Jones – assistant recording engineering (Dudebox)
- Igor Hofbauer – artwork and illustrations
- Antje Schröder – layout and package design

== Charts ==
=== Weekly charts ===
Chart (2016)	Peak position
Australian Albums (ARIA)	26
Austrian Albums (Ö3 Austria)	1
Belgian Albums (Ultratop Flanders)	66
Belgian Albums (Ultratop Wallonia)	82
Canadian Albums (Billboard)	1
Finnish Albums (Suomen virallinen lista)	26
German Albums (Offizielle Top 100)	1
Hungarian Albums (MAHASZ)	9
Scottish Albums (Official Charts)	14
Swiss Albums (Schweizer Hitparade)	1
UK Albums (Official Charts)	23
UK Album Downloads (Official Charts)	27
UK Rock & Metal Albums (Official Charts)	1
US Top Current Albums (Billboard)	96
US Heatseekers Albums (Billboard)	8
US Independent Albums (Billboard)	23
US Top Rock Albums (Billboard)	32

=== Year-end charts ===
Chart (2016)	Position
German Albums (Offizielle Top 100)	66

== Certifications ==
Region	Certification	Certified units/sales
Canada (Music Canada)	Gold	40,000^{‡}
Germany (BVMI)	Gold	100,000^{‡}
^{‡} Sales+streaming figures based on certification alone.
