= Crash Parallel =

Canadian musical group

- Origin: Mississauga, Ontario, Canada
- Genres: Alternative post-grunge
- Years active: 2005–2014
- Label: Sony BMG Canada
- Members: Tim Edwards; Dan Saitua; Gary Rugala; Rob Bezanson; Jon Fedorsen
- Past members: John Vitellaro
- Website: crashparallel.com (defunct)

Crash Parallel was a Canadian alternative rock band formed in 2005 in Mississauga, Ontario, who have been compared to Lifehouse, Counting Crows, the Fray, Coldplay, and David Gray. Their debut album, World We Know, was released May 6, 2008, and includes the first single and title track, "World We Know".

== History ==
Vocalist, Tim Edwards and guitarist, Danny Saitua, started writing songs together in 2004. Though Saitua was unsure if the project would work out, it was soon conspicuous that the two had a similar chemistry and musical direction after writing the song "Long Night Dreaming", which was later featured on the first season finale of the hit drama Falcon Beach on Global TV.

Eventually, Edwards and Saitua were joined by drummer John Vitellaro and bass player Gary Rugala who were drawn by the music that was already written. The quartet garnered an early following through performing local area gigs, including NXNE where the response was outstanding, and led to major buzz for the band at both college and online communities.

The band became a five-piece when they were joined by Rob Bezanson shortly after it was announced that the band had signed a deal with Sony BMG Music Canada.

The band made a cross-country Canadian tour with Moist singer, David Usher, from October 8 to November 7, 2008.

On September 6, they have finished recording for their second album.

In fall 2009, John Vitellaro left the band. Jon Fedorsen joined the band as their new drummer.

== World We Know ==
Just days before the release of World We Know, the band hit the No. 1 spot on The Billboard Canadian Emerging Artist Chart. The album was recorded at Chalet Studios in Ontario and produced by Dan Weston (City and Colour, Attack In Black), who also helped co-write "Not That Simple" and "Save Yourself" on the album and mixed by Mark Makoway (Buck 65, Sarah Slean, David Usher, Mat Mays)

The band released a video for the first single and title track, "World We Know", on April 14, 2008. The song and video both reflect powerful imagery and emotion that act as a call to arms that challenges our generation to take action and protect our world. Because of this, the video received media attention surrounding Earth Day 2008.

According to the band's Facebook page, they were still recording music as of 2013, although its members have gone on to other projects and the band has gone quiet. As of December 27, 2023, vocalist Tim Edwards has expressed interest in creating new music in the coming years.

== Band members ==
- Tim Edwards (Vocals, Guitar)
- Dan Saitua (Guitar)
- Gary Rugala (Bass)
- Rob Bezanson (Piano)

== Discography ==
=== EPs ===
Year	Title
2008	World We Know: Digital EP

=== Albums ===
Year	Title	Chart positions	
Year	Title	U.S.	CAN
May 6, 2008	World We Know	-	-
February 8, 2011	Sunset in Reverse	-	-

=== Singles ===
Year	Song	Chart positions		Album
Year	Song	CAN	CAN Hot AC	Album
2008	"World We Know"	33	11	World We Know
2008	"Long Night Dreaming"	-	-	World We Know
2008	"Rain Delays"	80	26	World We Know
2008	"Don't Let Go"	-	-	World We Know
2008	"Casualties of War"	-	-	World We Know
2009	"Change the Weather"	-	-	Sunset in Reverse
2010	"Want You More"	-	-	Sunset in Reverse

=== Music videos ===
The band has created three music videos, for "Rain Delays", "World We Know", and "Casualties of War". The music video for "Rain Delays" is a black and white montage of the band performing. The video for "World We Know" features the band playing in front of a screen showing images of the world, and reinforcing some of the song's lyrics. A music video for "Change the Weather" was released in October 2009.

== Awards ==
- Canadian Radio Music Awards 2009 - Best New Group of the Year
