= Billy Talent =

Canadian rock band

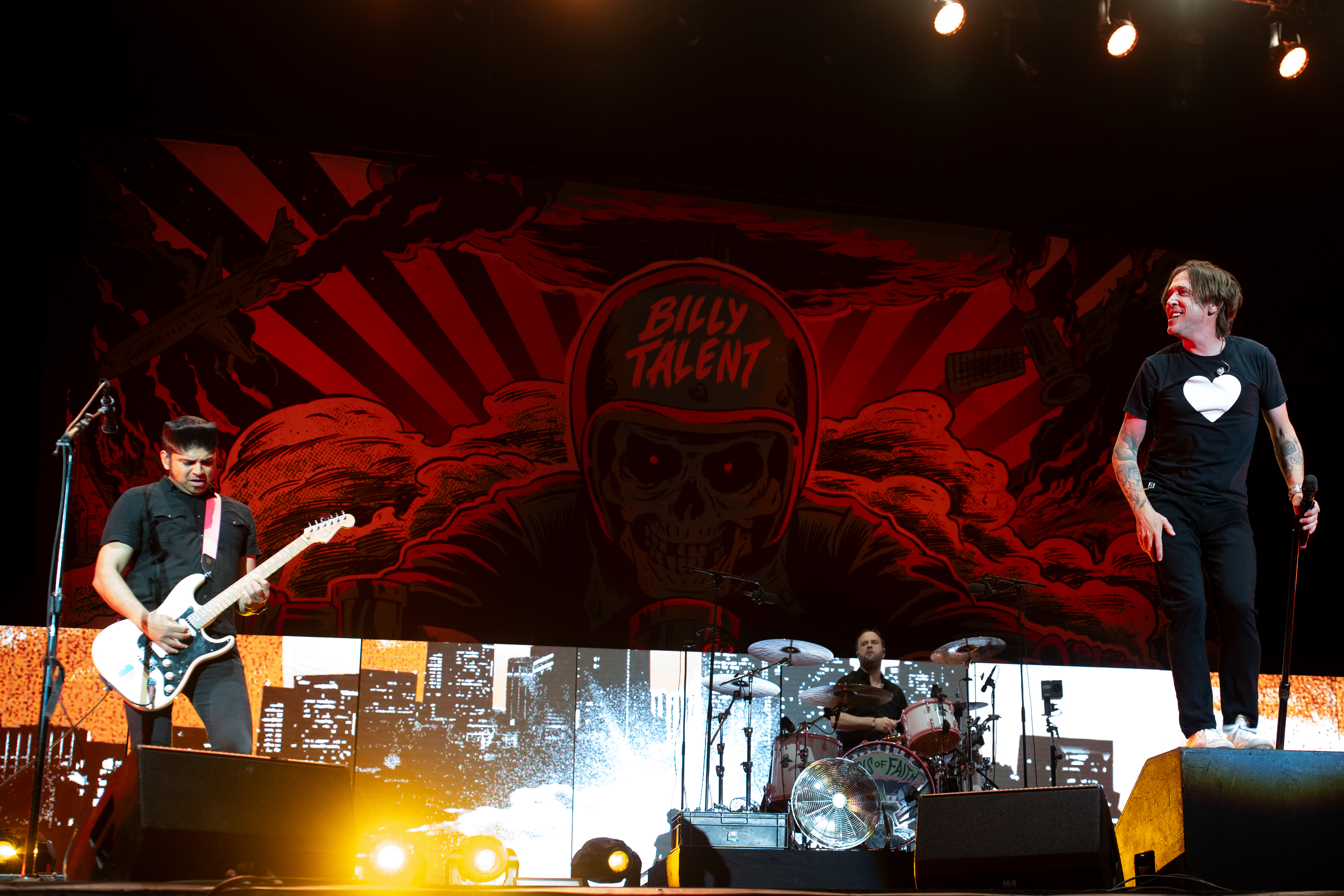
- Billy Talent in 2023. Left to right: Ian D'Sa, Loel Campbell, Benjamin Kowalewicz

Background information
- Also known as: Pezz (1993–1999)
- Origin: Mississauga, Ontario, Canada
- Genres: Alternative rock; punk rock; post-hardcore; pop-punk; emo
- Years active: 1993–present
- Labels: Atlantic; Warner; Roadrunner; Last Gang; The End; Spinefarm
- Members: Benjamin Kowalewicz; Ian D'Sa; Jonathan Gallant; Aaron Solowoniuk; Jordan Hastings
- Website: billytalent.com

Billy Talent is a Canadian rock band from Mississauga, Ontario. They formed in 1993 with lead vocalist Benjamin Kowalewicz, guitarist Ian D'Sa, bassist Jonathan Gallant, and drummer Aaron Solowoniuk. There have been no lineup changes, although Solowoniuk has been on hiatus from the band since 2016 due to a relapse of multiple sclerosis. In the three decades since their inception, Billy Talent has sold well over a million physical albums in Canada alone and nearly 3 million albums internationally. During their most successful period, they were ranked as one of the top 10 best-selling native bands in Canada.

The band existed for almost a decade before mainstream success. The members met and played in Our Lady of Mount Carmel Secondary School under the name Pezz and remained underground in Toronto's indie music scene until 2001. The band renamed itself Billy Talent after running into legal trouble with the old name. It was then that Kowalewicz's connection with an employee of Warner Music Canada's A&R department landed the band a record deal and launched them into mainstream success. Since then, Billy Talent has made three multi-platinum records in Canada and continues to expand their success overseas; this included touring for 20 months supporting their second album. They released their third album, Billy Talent III, in 2009, and their fourth album, Dead Silence, in 2012. Dead Silence was followed up by a full UK tour throughout October and November 2012. To commemorate the longevity since the release of their first studio album, the band has released a greatest hits album entitled Hits in 2014.

In 2015, they began to prepare material for their fifth studio album. Just before entering the studio, drummer Aaron Solowoniuk decided to sit out the recording sessions while he continued his longstanding battle with multiple sclerosis. Fellow Canadian Jordan Hastings was quickly recruited to play as Solowoniuk's studio stand-in, and, in early 2016, the group completed work on Afraid of Heights, which was released in July of that year. The band's most recent album Crisis of Faith, was released on January 17, 2022.

== History ==
=== Origins as Pezz (1993–1999) ===
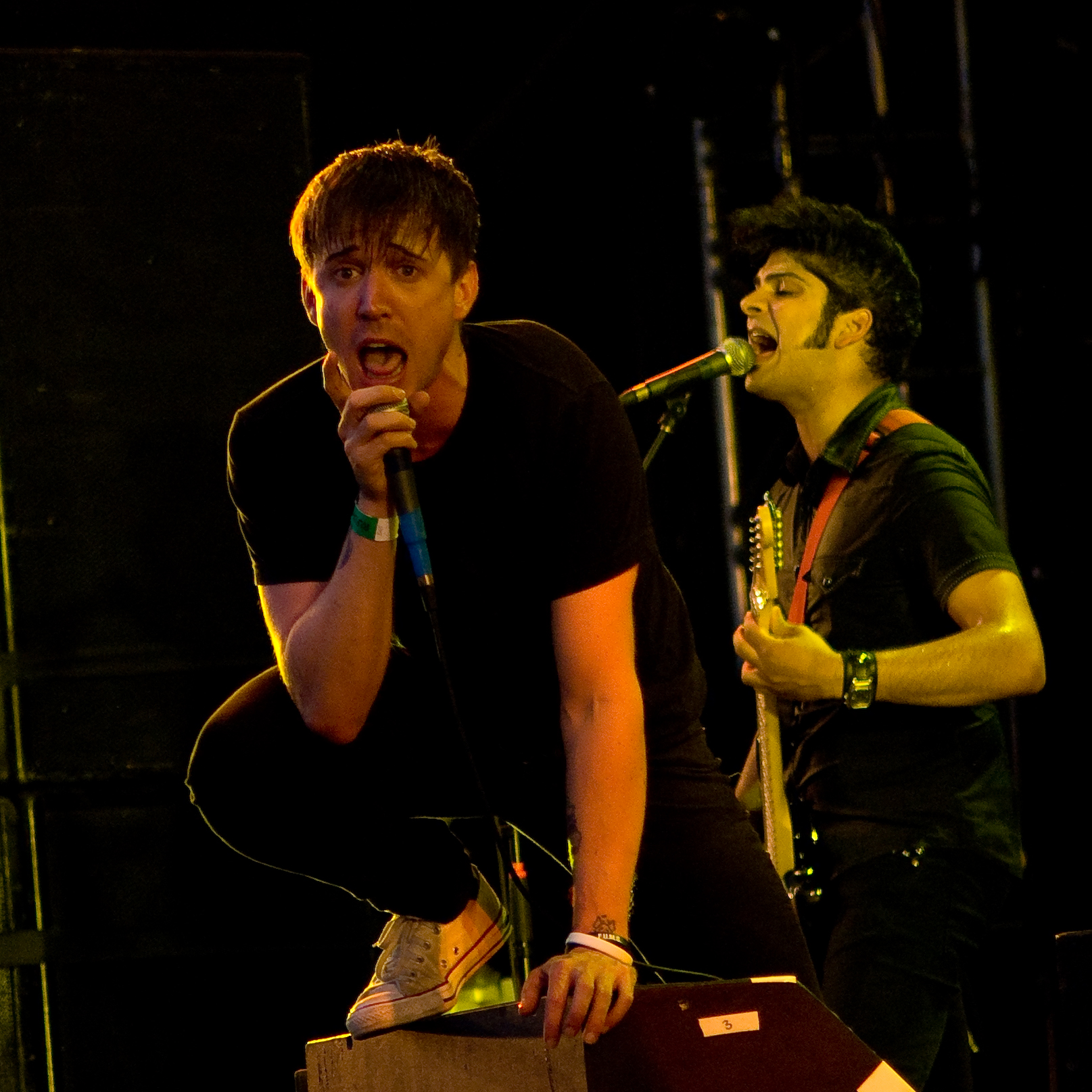
It wasn't until the recording of Watoosh! that Kowalewicz (left) and D'Sa started singing, "creating unique harmonies accented by the loud rock sound that the band was pumping out."

The band got together during a high school talent contest after forming in 1993. Pezz began writing, performing songs, and gaining attention and credibility at first locally, and soon in Toronto's broader indie music scene. Their first recording was a cheap 4-track demo. It was recorded in Ian D'Sa's basement in July 1994 and was named Demoluca, after a friend of the band named Jason Deluca had stopped by the house, banging on a basement window while the band was recording. Soon after, in January 1995, they all put in money to record another demo of better quality with engineer/producer Dave Tedesco at the "Signal to Noise" studio which they called Dudebox. Originally, two tracks from Demoluca and four newly recorded tracks were compiled onto it, but a year later the band recorded four more tunes live in the studio and re-released it. After these releases and their continued performances in the immediate area, Pezz was gaining a following in Mississauga and it continued to spread.

D'Sa studied classical animation at Sheridan College, and even worked on Angela Anaconda as an animator. Gallant almost finished a business degree. Kowalewicz was in between jobs, one which included working at 102.1 the edge. Solowoniuk worked at Chrysler Canada. But during this, each member found the time and finances to max-out their credit cards, and record their first full-length album in 1999. They laid down twelve tracks at a studio called "Great Big Music", collaborating with Juno-nominated music producer Brad Nelson. Kowalewicz started singing in melody with D'Sa. The music began to transform from "raw rap-rock" songs into "catchy and angst-ridden pop-punk anthems". With that, Watoosh! was born and independently released. While popular within Toronto's indie scene, it did not reach large mainstream sales levels.

=== Billy Talent and success (1999–2004) ===
In 1999, the Canadian Pezz received documentation from an American band named Pezz proving that the latter had held the name internationally since 1989. The Canadian band had no legal claim to their old name and thus changed it to Billy Talent, inspired by the guitarist "Billy Tallent" from Michael Turner's novel Hard Core Logo. The film adaptation by Bruce McDonald would be the inspirational medium for the band. This, however, still led to fans mistaking Kowalewicz as being named Billy Talent.

Try Honesty
A sample of "Try Honesty" from Billy Talent's self-titled album, the band's first album under the name. The album showed evidence of being more aggressive and influenced by punk rock.

Now known as Billy Talent, their sound began to move in a more aggressive, punk rock direction. During this time, Kowalewicz ran into Jen Hirst, at 102.1 The Edge, the Toronto radio station he worked at. She had seen the band perform as Pezz, and he asked her to check out the band's performance at a club. This would prove to pay off, as Hirst was later hired by Warner Music Canada to work in A&R. This connection would get the band their producer Gavin Brown, and a demo deal with the label. Before the demos were recorded, a local manager called Atlantic Records A&R executives, who were already in Toronto, to see the band perform in its tiny rehearsal space.

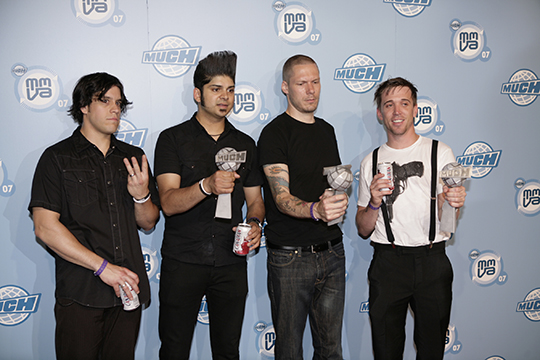
From left to right: Jonathan Gallant, Ian D'Sa, Aaron Solowoniuk, and Benjamin Kowalewicz

In 2002, the band met with record executives, and ended up signing a co-venture agreement with Atlantic Records and Warner Music Canada. In the fall of 2003, the band released their full-length self-titled album, Billy Talent. The album found considerable sales success. "Try Honesty" was a successful first single; it was followed by other singles "The Ex", "River Below", and "Nothing to Lose" into late 2003 and 2004. The band played sold-out shows in Canada and the United States and had success in Europe. The band received a Juno, (They won two Junos, Best Album of the Year, and Best Band of the Year) and MuchMusic Video Award nominations and awards, and spent late 2004 and most of 2005 touring. Billy Talent went on to be certified 3× platinum in Canada.

A track from the album titled "This Is How It Goes" was about Aaron Solowoniuk's fight with multiple sclerosis. On March 17, 2006, Aaron Solowoniuk revealed in a personal letter to fans that he was the friend in that song. Solowoniuk was confirmed to have the disease, which causes anything from numbness in the limbs to paralysis or loss of vision, in January 1999. His neurologist prescribed him medication that he would have to self inject three times a week, possibly for the rest of his life. Although it was a struggle for Solowoniuk to come to terms with the reality of the disease, going to numerous doctor appointments and touring with a mini-fridge in their van has become a normal routine.

=== Billy Talent II (2005–2007) ===
Devil in a Midnight Mass
A sample of "Devil in a Midnight Mass" from the album Billy Talent II. This demonstrates the general theme that fueled the record: "trust, the lack thereof or breaking up." "Devil in a Midnight Mass" is based on the story of a priest who was convicted of molesting children, and then murdered by another inmate while serving his time.

Billy Talent's second album was mostly recorded at The Warehouse Studio in Vancouver, British Columbia, which was produced by Gavin Brown again with Ian D'Sa co-producing for the first time, and mixed by Chris Lord-Alge.

Billy Talent II hit the shelves on June 27, 2006. It fared very well in Canada in its debut week, landing in at number 1 on the Canadian charts. It also enjoyed significant success in Germany, where it also debuted at number 1 in the album charts in its debut week, and was one of the top 10 selling albums in the country. As of June 15, 2007, the album has sold almost 700,000 units worldwide, 215,000 of them in Canada making it certified 2× Platinum, and 200,000 shipped units in Germany achieved it platinum status there. Since then, the record has gone on to be certified 4× platinum in Canada and 2× platinum in Germany, putting the album over 1 million units sold worldwide. However, the success did not duplicate itself in the U.S. The band has expressed that they know they are a new band there, and they are choosing to concentrate their attention on Canada, Europe, and other places overseas instead.

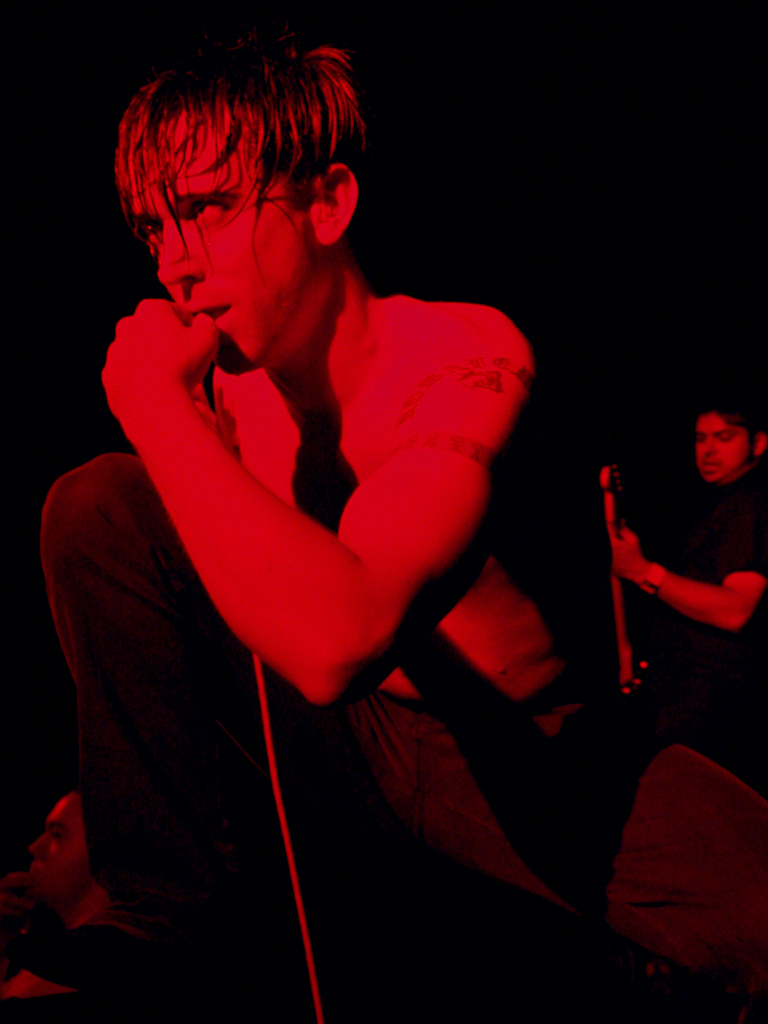
Kowalewicz at the Cardiff University Students' Union on August 8, 2006. This was the band's second international tour, and played in countries like Finland, Norway, Luxembourg, and Belgium for the first time.

The album contains less anger and profanity than their previous self-titled album. More of the songs dealt with real-life issues, to the praise of fans and critics.

We wanted to do something completely different from the first record because we had changed dramatically and had learned a lot from personal relationships. Everyone in the band is partnering up and dealing with those issues. The general theme of this record is trust, the lack thereof or breaking up. That seemed to fuel the record.

— Jonathan Gallant, Ottawa Sun

The band ventured off on another UK tour in support of Billy Talent II, but this one would include more shows in countries they had not performed in before. During this tour leg, the gigs at London and Manchester, on September 8 and 16, respectively, were recorded live. Limited edition CDs were released as the band's first live album, Live from the UK Sept./2006. Also during the tour, the band had to miss their Southampton show "due to a death in the family". The whole band returned the following month to play the show.

The band started their first Canadian arena tour with the bands Rise Against, Anti-Flag, and Moneen, performing in British Columbia, Alberta, Saskatchewan, Manitoba, Quebec, and ending in Ontario. Following the Canadian tour, the band ventured onto their first U.S. club tour.

The band went on a large overseas tour, beginning on June 1, 2007. They temporarily came back in mid June to play shows at the MuchMusic Video Awards, the Molson Amphitheatre in Toronto with good friends Alexisonfire, Cancer Bats, and Attack in Black. Plus the Quebec City Summer Festival with Alexisonfire in Quebec City. They returned overseas, selling out multiple venues in Australia and performing at the MTV Australia Video Music Awards. They had planned to end their tour on September 3, but the band played shows in St. John's, Newfoundland, Saint John, New Brunswick, and Halifax, Nova Scotia on September 5, 7 and 8, respectively. As of September 11, 2007, the band has indicated that their 18-month tour has officially ended, and they are "home for a while to catch [their] breath a little before [they] start writing the next record." In the meantime, a live DVD album called 666 was released on November 27, 2007, featuring footage and audio from the band's performances at London's Brixton Academy, Düsseldorf's Philipshalle, and Germany's Rock am Ring festival (at the Nürburgring).

In 2008, they opened for American group My Chemical Romance in the U.S. with a smaller group Drive By and attended several festivals and held concerts in Canada and Europe later on. Vocalist Benjamin Kowalewicz stated on July 1, on Billy Talent's official forum, that they are staying put in Canada until the album is finished, and that their promotional tour for II has come to an end. Their song "Red Flag" was featured in Burnout Revenge, Burnout Legends, SSX on Tour, and NHL 06.

=== Billy Talent III (2008–2011) ===
The single for "Turn Your Back" (a collaboration with the band Anti-Flag) was released on September 15 in the UK and most of Europe, on September 16 in the U.S. and Canada and September 20 in Australia. "Turn Your Back" was also featured in the video game NHL 09.

The band entered the studio in November with Brendan O'Brien, who has previously worked with Rage Against the Machine, Incubus, Stone Temple Pilots, Soundgarden, Pearl Jam and the Red Hot Chili Peppers. The band embarked on a supporting tour for the fourth album, starting in Australia in the Soundwave Festival in February. Also, they played two sideways, one in Sydney and one in Melbourne, with Emery and Face to Face opening for them. After Australia, the band headed to North America, where they played the three-day Coachella Festival. Ian revealed that the new album is to be called Billy Talent III.

During summer 2009, Billy Talent toured North America with Rise Against and Rancid. On February 26, the band was announced for Download festival in the U.K. They also played in Columbus, Ohio at Rock on the Range in May 2009. During the Melbourne Soundwave show, Kowalewicz announced they would tour Australia again in August. Billy Talent also played at Reading and Leeds Festivals 2009. Following the twin festivals, the band toured the U.K. in late October/early November before moving on to tour the U.S. in support of their new album. In an interview with UpVenue, bassist Jonathan Gallant announced that the Canadian tour would begin in winter 2010 but would be an extensive one.

Their third album, Billy Talent III was released on July 10, 2009, in Europe, July 13 in the United Kingdom, and July 14 in Canada. The album was released on September 22 in the United States on the Roadrunner Records label.

Billy Talent kicked off their 2009 European tour on October 19, commenting before the tour that they "can't wait to come over to Europe and the U.K.". They followed the European tour with a Canadian tour in March 2010, with Against Me!, Alexisonfire and Cancer Bats supporting. On February 1, "Saint Veronika" was released as the third single from Billy Talent III.

On February 16, 2010, Billy Talent released iTunes Session, over iTunes, a 7-track EP with songs from all three of the Billy Talent albums.

In August 2010, Billy Talent played three tour dates in South Africa, one in Cape Town, Durban and at Oppikoppi along with other local bands such as Taxi Violence, Zebra and Giraffe, and Jack Parow. The band then played the main stage at the Reading and Leeds Festivals in the summer, along with bands such as Blink-182, Guns N' Roses, Arcade Fire, Paramore, Weezer, Green Day, Lostprophets, and Young Guns. This was the band's last performances on the Billy Talent III Tour; it was also announced by Kowalewicz that the band was going to take a break before beginning work on their next album.

=== Dead Silence (2012–2014) ===
In April 2011, Kowalewicz stated that "At this point there is no time frame for touring, as our main priority is finishing writing and recording this new record". Kowalewicz also stated "the songs this far is unlike anything we've ever done before yet it still seems to capture the urgency of our first record". Kowalewicz stated, in an interview, that the first three albums would form a trilogy and that the new album would not be named Billy Talent IV. In August 2011, it was announced in an interview with the band that their new album will be recorded in November. The album was produced by Ian D'Sa and engineered by Eric Ratz and Kenny Luong who worked on Billy Talent II. The album's first single "Viking Death March" was digitally released on May 25, 2012. The music video for the track was recorded at Germany's Rock am Ring Festival and at Melkweg Amsterdam. The album's second single "Surprise Surprise" was released on August 7, 2012, on iTunes. The band released the album Dead Silence on September 4, 2012, on their SoundCloud account.

The band embarked on a Canadian tour with Sum 41, Hollerado, Indian Handcrafts, and Monster Truck (replaced Sum 41 when they dropped out of the tour for the last shows in Ottawa and Halifax for medical reasons).

On August 22, 2014, the band announced Hits, a compilation album of their most successful singles to date, plus two new songs. On September 25, 2014, Billy Talent released one of the two new songs as a single, titled "Kingdom of Zod". The single did not receive a lot of promotion upon release but did peak at #5 in Canada the following January, making the single a sleeper hit. On November 4, 2014, Hits was released. The same day, the other new song, "Chasing The Sun," was released as a radio single, but did not chart until May 2015.

=== Afraid of Heights (2015–2018) ===
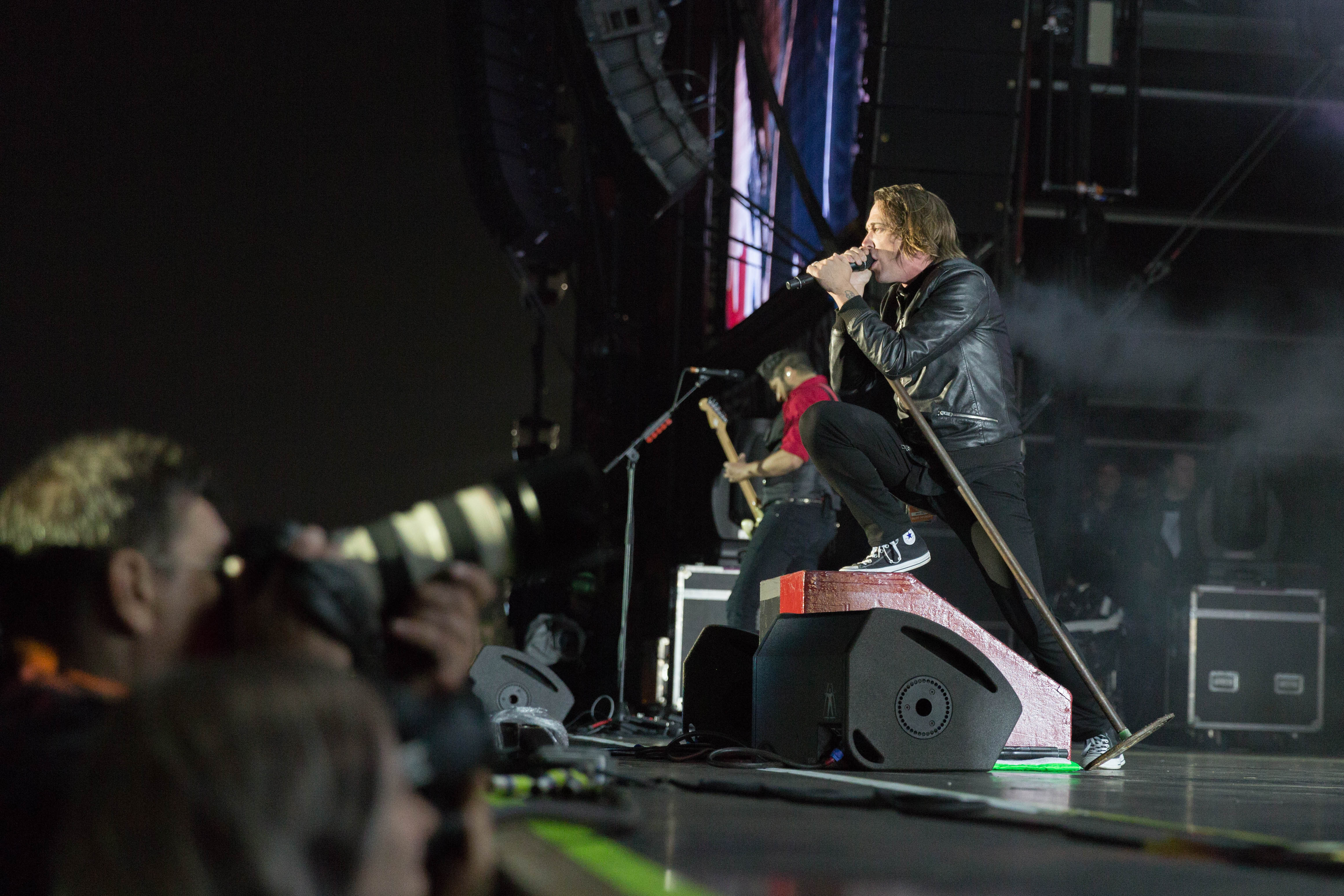
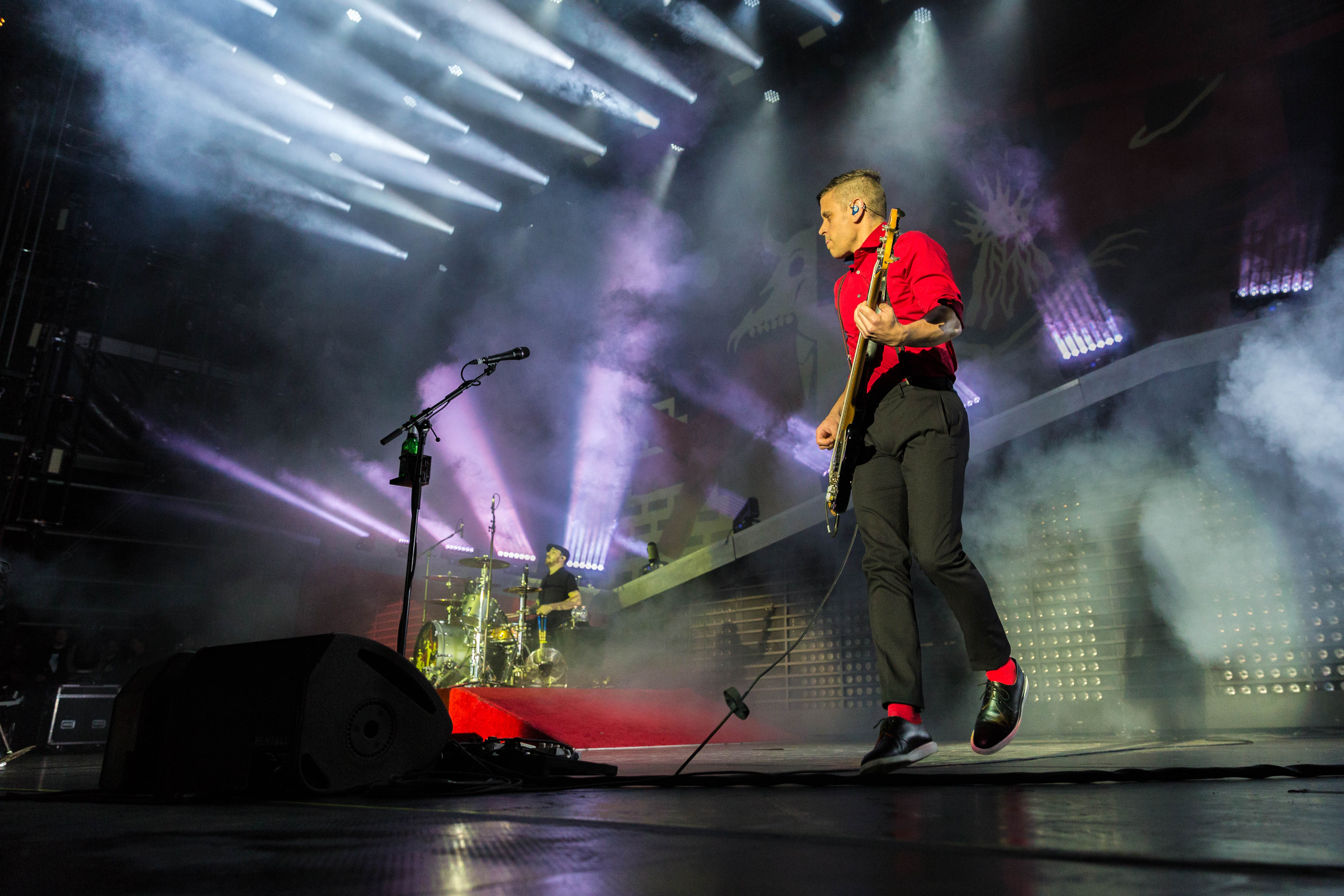
Billy Talent at Rock am Ring 2016

On May 9, 2015, the band announced at SiriusXM Indies that they have been in the studio for the past few months, writing and demoing an upcoming album. They also announced that the album will be released in 2016. On November 26, 2015, Kowalewicz announced that they will be entering the studio to start recording January 4, 2016, and should release their new album before summer 2016. On January 15, 2016, Aaron announced via the Billy Talent YouTube channel that he would be taking a hiatus from the band due to an MS relapse. Jordan Hastings from Alexisonfire, Cunter, and Say Yes was announced to be filling in and doing the drum work on the new album in his place. Official band photographs in promotion of the new album feature both drummers.

On May 12, 2016, the band announced their album Afraid of Heights; it was released on July 29, 2016. On the same day, the band aired their first single from the new album, "Afraid of Heights". On June 3, 2016, the band released a second single from the album, titled "Louder Than The DJ." On July 16, 2016, the band opened for Guns N' Roses at the Rogers Centre. The following week, the band released the third and final single from Afraid of Heights, titled "Ghost Ship Of Cannibal Rats." Solowoniuk joined the group at their February 27, 2017, show at Toronto's Air Canada Centre to perform "Pins And Needles" and "Surrender". The band was also joined by Jeremy Widerman from Monster Truck to perform a cover of The Tragically Hip song "Nautical Disaster" in dedication to Gord Downie.

=== Crisis of Faith (2019–present) ===
On November 26, 2019, the band released "Forgiveness I + II", which would later be revealed as the opening track on their upcoming record. The song was a stylistic change for the band, showcasing elements of progressive rock, along with the use of synthesizers and a saxophone solo. This was also the band's longest released song to date, clocking in at just under seven minutes. Later, on January 24, 2020, the band released their first radio single since 2016, called "Reckless Paradise". This single was more typical of band's signature post-hardcore sound. The single hit #1 in Canada on February 22, 2020. On April 3, 2020, the band released another new single called "I Beg to Differ (This Will Get Better)". Not originally intended to be a single, the band released it as a hopeful, yet bittersweet response to the delay and cancellation of many scheduled tour dates due to the COVID-19 pandemic. The band also posted a list of crisis hotlines for fans in need of moral support, using this song as a motif. The song peaked at #1 in Canada on October 3, 2020.

Almost a year later, after being mostly inactive on social media, the band released the single "End of Me", featuring Weezer vocalist Rivers Cuomo on September 10, 2021, and subsequently announced that their sixth studio album, titled Crisis of Faith, would be released on January 21, 2022. In support of the album, the band announced that they will be touring Canada with PUP and Rise Against in February and April 2022. On November 13, 2021, "End of Me" reached number one on the Canadian Rock chart, making every promotional single for Crisis of Faith a number-one hit. This made for the band's most successful rollout of singles in their career.

On January 26, 2026, the band announced a tour in support of the 20th anniversary of the band's second studio album, Billy Talent II.

== Musical style ==
Billy Talent's musical style has been described as alternative rock, punk rock, post-hardcore, pop-punk, hard rock, and emo. Watoosh! saw the band mixing multiple genres and making diverse songs on the same album, stretching from hip hop to indie and ska punk. However, this evolved into a more collected sound that was a mix of fewer genres on their second album, Billy Talent. The result of this has not been described by the band as their defining sound and that it was something that appeared to them after experimenting with different styles. On Billy Talent II, the band altered their sound yet again, based on more mid-tempo and emotional compositions; a bit more collected than their previous work. It was also based on far less angst and aggression behind the production, things that were known factors behind their debut. The band also experimented with elements of post-punk and uses of pianos, loops, and half-stepped guitar tunings on Billy Talent III and Dead Silence. The uses of synth-basses and drum loops made their appearance in Afraid of Heights on the songs "Horses & Chariots" and "Afraid of Heights (Reprise)", almost emulating a space rock influence to that of Muse. In their music there are raw and frequent backup vocals heavily collaborated by main vocals, quick dynamic changes between loud and quiet, and Kowalewicz's characteristic vocals which are the key elements that emphasize that assertion.

They have cited influences including At the Drive-In, Refused, Thursday, Rise Against, and the Clash.

== Band members ==
Current

- Benjamin Kowalewicz – lead vocals (1993–present)
- Ian D'Sa – guitar, keyboards, backing vocals (1993–present)
- Jonathan Gallant – bass guitar, backing vocals (1993–present)
- Aaron Solowoniuk – drums (1993–present; on hiatus 2016–present)
- Jordan Hastings – drums, percussion (2016–present; on hiatus 2022–present)

Touring

- Alejandro Serritiello – drums (2025–present)
- Loel Campbell – drums (2022–2025)

Timeline

== Awards ==
Billy Talent has received a significant amount of recognition in Canada, winning 10 awards from 32 nominations at the MuchMusic Video Awards and 7 awards from 20 nominations at the Juno Awards. The band has also been nominated at the MuchMusic Video Awards every year since 2004. Overall, Billy Talent has received 21 awards from 56 nominations in Canada. The band also had the number 1 rock song of 2009 "Devil on My Shoulder" on Much Music's holiday wrap, along with the number five song "Fallen Leaves" for much music's 99 best music videos. They are also the most nominated band in Much Music Video Award history.

== Discography ==
Studio albums

- Watoosh! (1999) (as Pezz)
- Billy Talent (2003)
- Billy Talent II (2006)
- Billy Talent III (2009)
- Dead Silence (2012)
- Afraid of Heights (2016)
- Crisis of Faith (2022)

== See also ==
- Canadian rock
- Music of Canada
- Music of Ontario
