= Jordan Hastings =

Canadian drummer (born 1982)

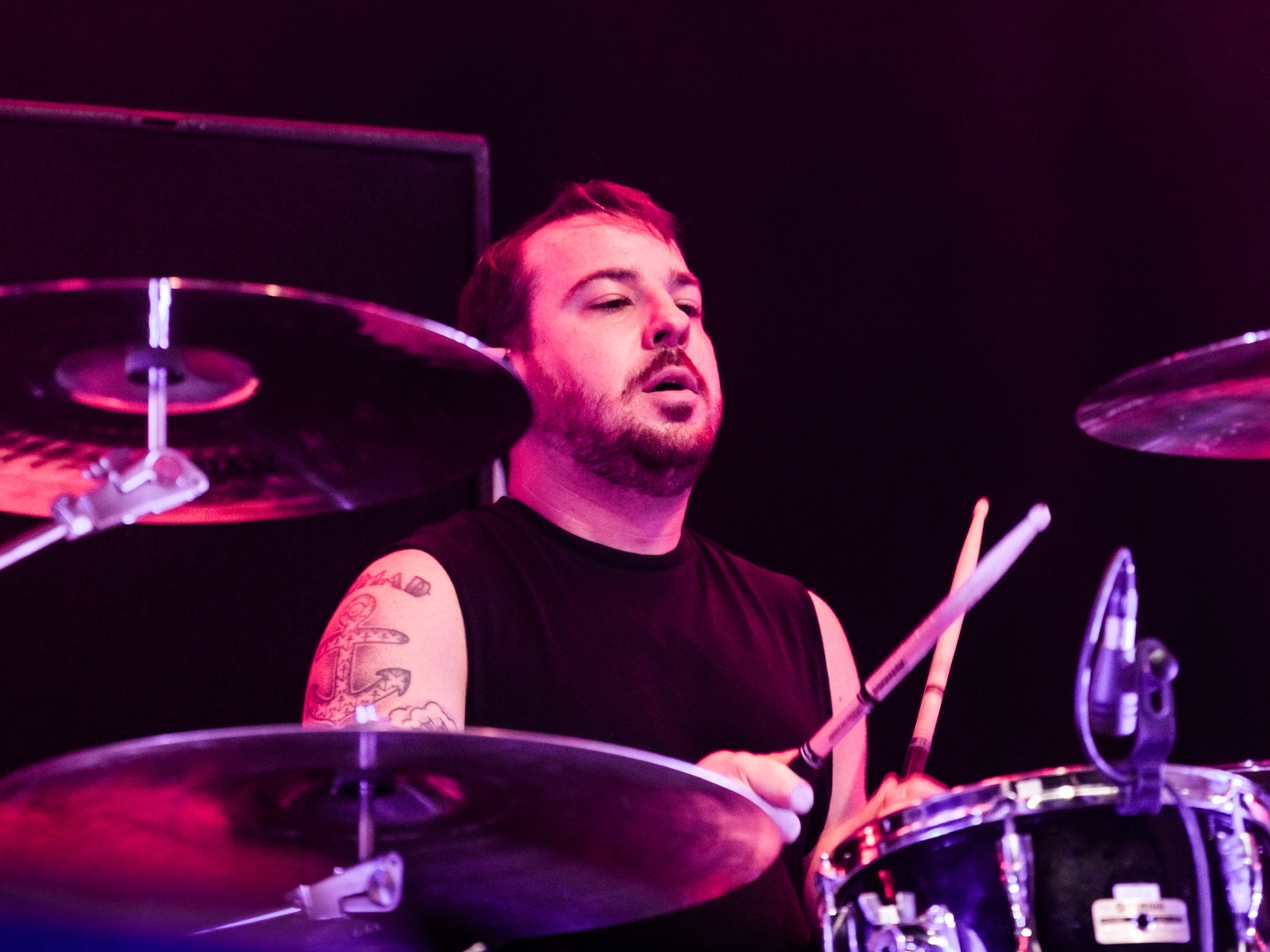
- Hastings in 2018

Background information
- Also known as: Ratbeard
- Born: Jordan Michael Hastings; March 15, 1982 (age 44); Hamilton, Ontario, Canada
- Genres: Post-hardcore; punk rock; hardcore punk; pop-punk; alternative rock; metalcore
- Occupation: Musician
- Instrument: Drums
- Years active: 1995–present
- Member of: Alexisonfire; Billy Talent; Cunter
- Formerly of: The Black Lungs; Jersey

Jordan "Ratbeard" Michael Hastings (born March 15, 1982) is a Canadian musician born in Hamilton, Ontario. He is best known as the drummer of Alexisonfire, and has recorded two records with Billy Talent.

Hastings was previously the drummer for the Burlington-based bands Jersey, Chapter One, and Hoodrat, none of which are currently active. He is currently active as a member of Cunter.

In 2011, Hastings co-created, with Joel Carriere, the Dine Alone Records side project Dine Alone Foods. In mid-2012 he co-founded a cigar, tobacco and barber shop Burlington, Ontario, Village Cigar Company And Barbershop. He sold his share in 2013.

Hastings is now drummer for the trio Say Yes, which consists of guitarist/vocalist Adam Michael and bassist/vocalist Michael Zane and will release their debut self-titled EP August 19, 2014 with Dine Alone Records.

In January 2016, Hastings began filling in for Aaron Solowoniuk in the band Billy Talent, after Solowoniuk had a multiple sclerosis relapse. He recorded the drums for their album Afraid of Heights, released in July 2016. With Solowoniuk still unable to play after the album's release, Hastings then went on further with the band, playing the subsequent tour promoting the album and on the band's latest album, Crisis of Faith.
