= Aaron Solowoniuk =

Canadian drummer

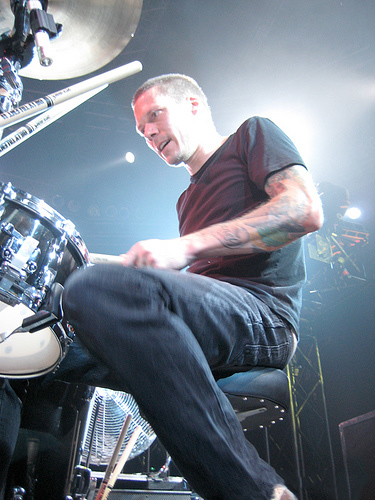
- Solowoniuk performing with Billy Talent in 2007

Background information
- Born: Streetsville, Ontario, Canada
- Genres: Punk rock; alternative rock; post-hardcore; pop-punk
- Occupation: Musician
- Instrument: Drums
- Years active: 1993–present
- Member of: Billy Talent

Aaron Solowoniuk (/ˌsɒləˈvɒn.jʊk/ SOL-ə-VON-yuuk) is a Canadian musician, best known as the drummer for the rock band Billy Talent.

== Background ==
Solowoniuk was born and raised in Streetsville, a neighbourhood of Mississauga, Ontario, and began drumming at a young age. His first drum set was a gift from his parents. His father was born in Ukraine. His grandfathers were from Poland.

As he grew up, Solowoniuk continued drumming and eventually met Benjamin Kowalewicz and Jon Gallant at their high school, Our Lady of Mount Carmel Catholic Secondary School where they started a band called To Each His Own. A few years later, the band met Ian D'Sa who was playing in Dragon Flower. The four later joined up together and became The Other One, then later Pezz. Solowoniuk continued to play in Pezz and after high school, he got his auto body certificate and worked at a Chrysler factory as an assembly line worker. In 1999, Solowoniuk helped record two demo tapes, and Watoosh!, Pezz's first full-length album. Pezz would later become Billy Talent.

In March 2006, he wrote a letter to the bands' fans in which he told them that he had been diagnosed with multiple sclerosis. The Billy Talent song "This Is How It Goes" is written about Solowoniuk's battle with the illness. He had kept it secret in an attempt to avoid unwanted pity, but decided to reveal his condition after discovering some MS cases are diagnosed as early as three years of age. Since then Solowoniuk has become an advocate for finding a cure for MS. An example of his dedication for fighting MS, Solowoniuk helped organize F.U.M.S, a concert benefit on Boxing Day 2006 which Billy Talent, Moneen and Alexisonfire performed at The Opera House in Toronto. All proceeds from the show went to the Multiple Sclerosis Society of Canada.

On 2 February 2012, he underwent open-heart surgery. He wrote a letter to his fans through Facebook informing them of it on 17 February. On 15 January 2016, Solowoniuk explained in a video that he would not be playing the drums for the rehearsal of their fifth studio album, due to an MS relapse. Instead, Jordan Hastings from Alexisonfire would be playing on the record.

As of Billy Talent's 2022 tour with Rise Against and Anti-Flag, Solowoniuk is still not playing drums live, but is still with the band on tour, handling charitable events and occasionally playing one or two songs. He organized the food drive during this tour.

== Equipment ==
Aaron has been known to play Pearl drums, most often the Masters Kit, with tom sizes of 12" and 16", along with a 22" bass drum. He also uses the HHX and AAX lines of Sabian cymbals.
