= Ian D'Sa =

Canadian guitarist

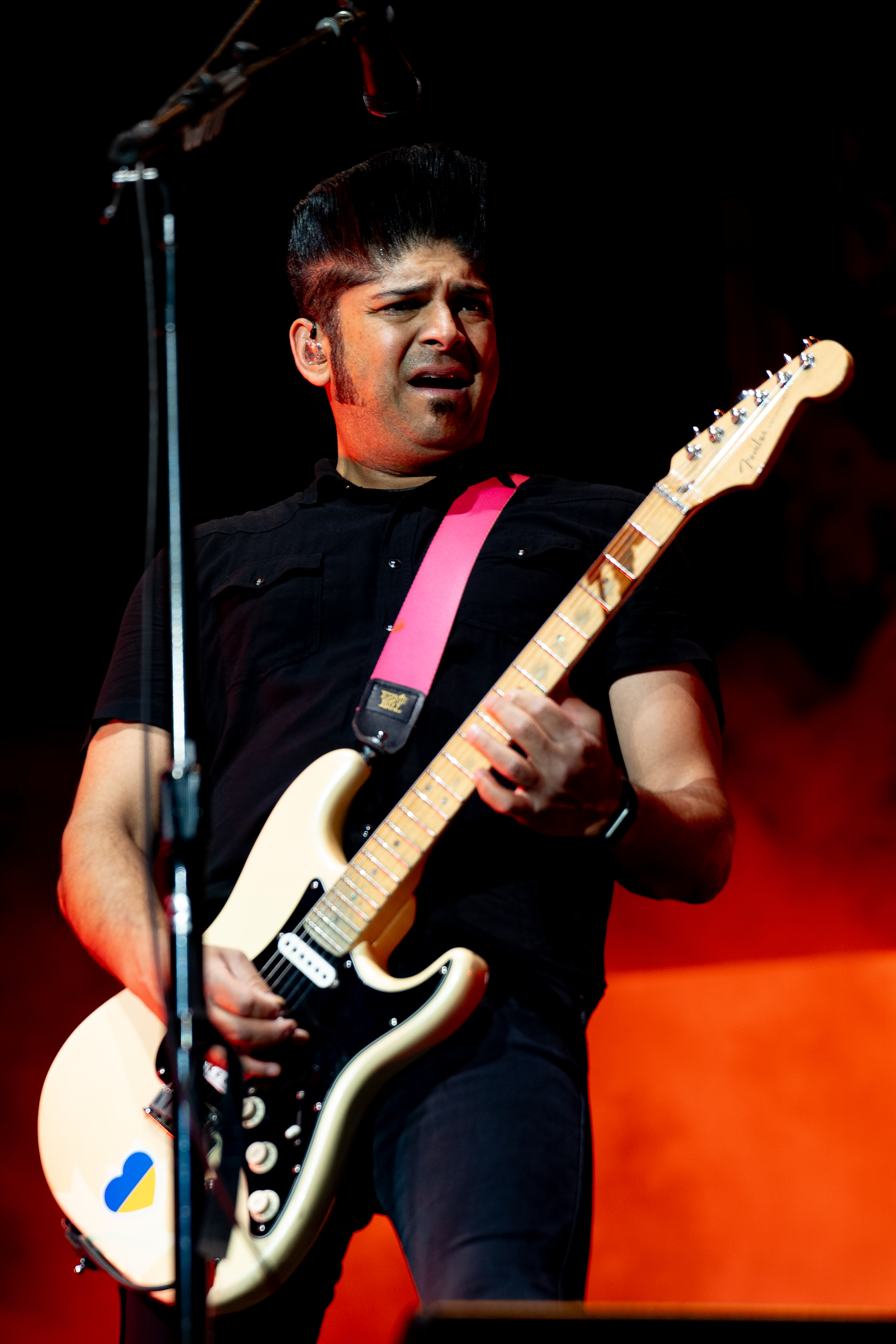
- D'Sa performing in 2023

Background information
- Born: October 30, 1975 (age 50); Southall, London, England
- Origin: Mississauga, Ontario, Canada
- Genres: Punk rock; alternative rock; post-hardcore; pop-punk
- Occupations: Musician; record producer; songwriter
- Instruments: Guitar; vocals; keyboards
- Years active: 1993–present
- Member of: Billy Talent

Ian D'Sa (born October 30, 1975) is a Canadian guitarist, producer and songwriter best known as a member of the rock band Billy Talent.

== Early life and career ==
Ian was born in the suburb of Southall, Ealing, London. He is of Goan background. His family moved to Canada when he was three years old. He grew up in Mississauga, Ontario, learning guitar at the age of 13. He attended Our Lady of Mount Carmel Secondary School. In 1991, he formed a band named Dragonflower with some fellow schoolmates. After Dragonflower broke up, he formed another band named Soluble Fish and recorded a five-song demo entitled Nugget Sauces. He eventually met Benjamin Kowalewicz, Jonathan Gallant and Aaron Solowoniuk in 1993 at a high school talent show. He started a new band with them named Pezz (later to become Billy Talent) while also playing in Soluble Fish. Both bands played shows together until Soluble Fish broke up in 1996. Still playing with Pezz, D'Sa went to OCAD and then Sheridan College where he got his degree in classical animation and has worked on the TV shows Angela Anaconda, Birdz, and the film Adventures in 3-D IMAX as a character animator. Pezz changed their name to Billy Talent a few years later in 1998.

== Billy Talent ==
In 1998, Pezz changed their name to Billy Talent after the fictional character in Michael Turner's Hard Core Logo book. D'Sa co-produced the album Billy Talent II with Gavin Brown. He also did art direction and package design on the album. He received co-direction credit for the video "Fallen Leaves", for which the band was awarded Best Video and Best Rock Video at the 2007 MuchMusic Video Awards. Released in September 2012, the fourth album of the band, Dead Silence, was produced entirely by D'Sa. He was nominated for Producer of the Year at the 2017 Juno Awards for his work on the band's fifth album, Afraid of Heights.

D'Sa produced his first two singles on Die Mannequin's EP Slaughter Daughter, the songs being "Do it or Die" and "Saved by Strangers". He played guitar on Sarah Slean's song "Lucky Me". He makes a cameo in The Operation M.D.'s single "Sayonara" as a doctor pushing Stevo in a wheelchair. He also makes a brief cameo as a year book photo in the K-OS video for "ELEctrik HeaT - the seekwiLL". He also sang guest vocals with Alexisonfire during a few live shows.

D'Sa is known for making unexpected appearances at other bands' live shows and to guest as vocalist sometimes with Alexisonfire. He joined Sum 41 as a guest guitarist for a one-off performance of their popular encore song "Pain for Pleasure", and also performed as a guest in one show with British band Reuben in 2006, while the band supported Billy Talent. He produced the first single, "Buried at Sea", from The Operation M.D.'s second studio album Birds + Bee Stings, which was released in June 2010.

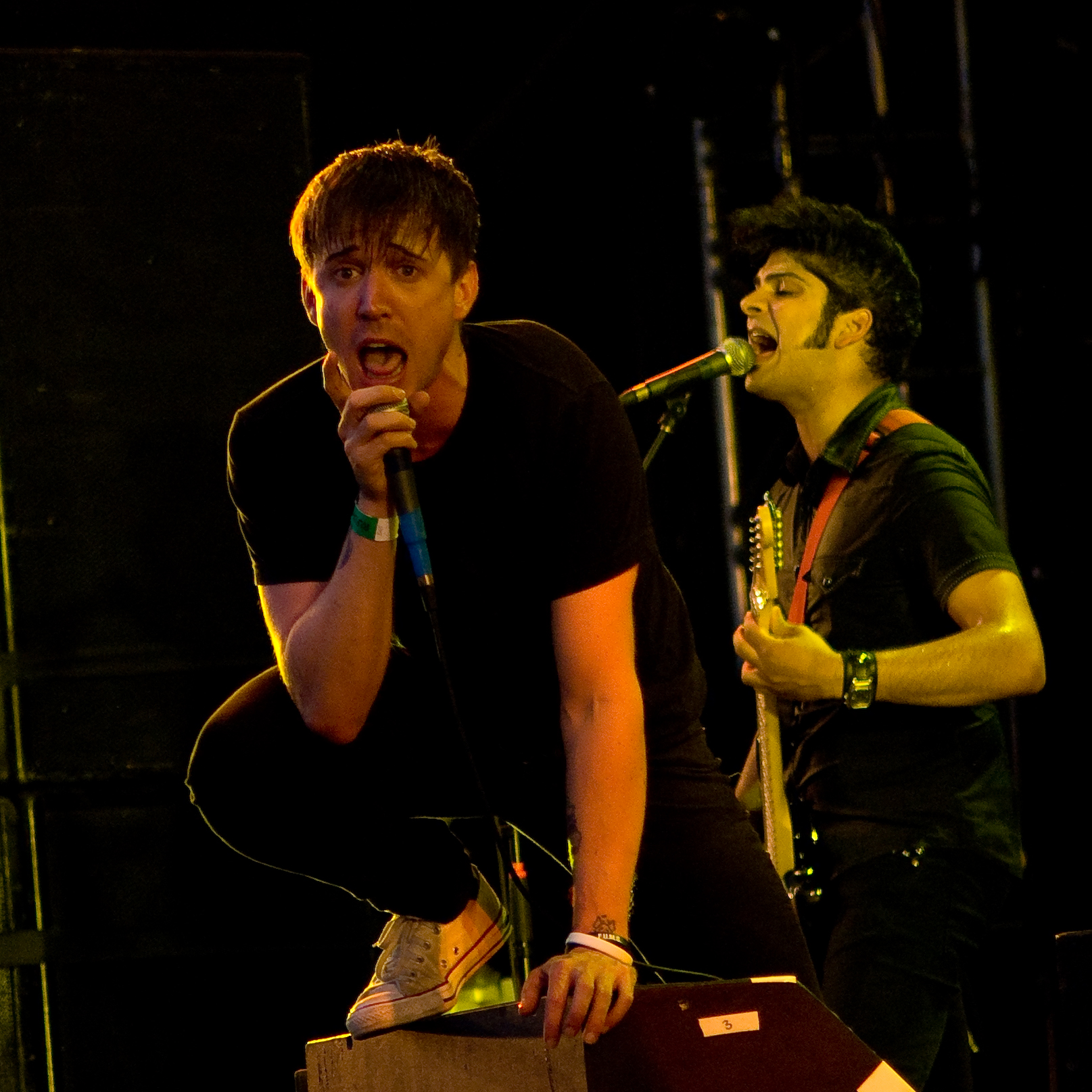
D'Sa (right) with Billy Talent in 2007

D'Sa has been involved with Song for Africa since 2007, a project to connect Canada's youth to the AIDS pandemic, playing guitar on the song and in the video and single. In July 2007, he travelled to Kenya for 10 days to be part of the Song for Africa documentary film. D'Sa also wrote and recorded the song "Land of a Thousand Hills" for the benefit album Song for Africa – Rwanda: Rises Up!, in which he sings lead vocals and plays guitar with punk rock band Noble Blood. In November 2012, he contributed a guitar solo to the song "Toast to Freedom", recorded by Anti-Flag for Amnesty International as a benefit single. He played solo in the video for the song.

D'Sa and fellow Billy Talent bandmate Ben Kowalewicz appeared in the music video for Emigrate's song "1234", whom Kowalewicz provided co-lead vocals for.

== Musical equipment ==
When playing live shows, D'Sa plays an Olympic White Fender Stratocaster Fat Strat Deluxe with a black pickguard loaded with Seymour Duncan JB Trembucker pickups. He also plays a Montego Black Stratocaster Fat Strat Deluxe with a red pickguard loaded with Seymour Duncan JB Trembucker pickups. When recording in the studio, his favourite guitars are a '52 Fender Telecaster Reissue (nicknamed "Crispy Chicken"), a '72 Fender Telecaster Deluxe (nicknamed "Rooster"), a '57 Gibson Les Paul Junior and several other vintage guitars.

D'Sa has said that "Crispy Chicken" is one of his main recording guitars, and has been used on all six Billy Talent albums along with other guitars such as his '57 Junior, for overdubs. He also owns a three colour sunburst stratocaster with a white pick guard, which is shown in the "Devil in a Midnight Mass" music video. His main live amp setup consists of a 60 watt head custom made by Mark Stephenson of Stephenson Amplification, along with a Diezel VH4.

== Discography ==
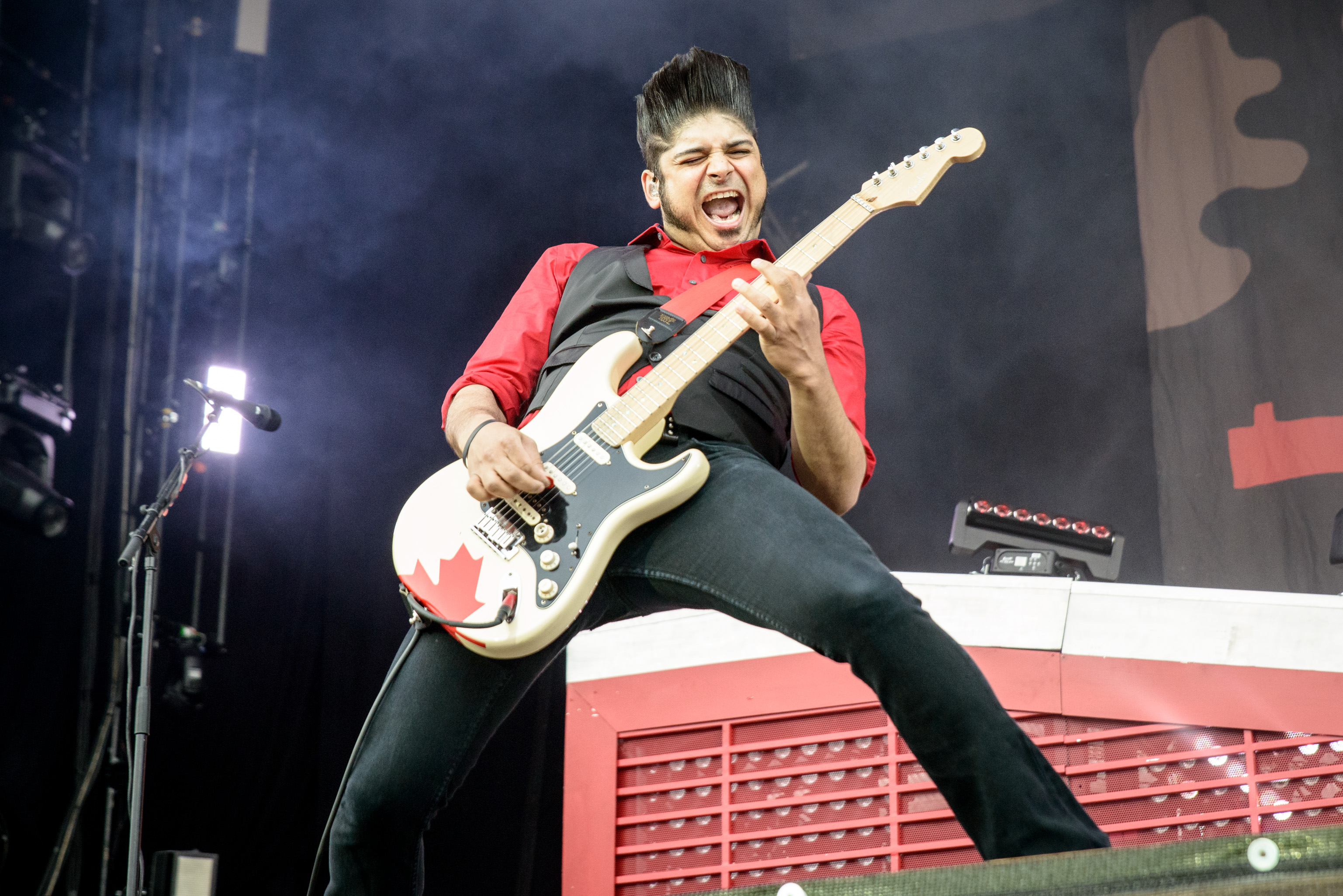
D'Sa with Billy Talent at Rock im Park 2016

Album appearances

- Pezz – Demoluca demo (1994)
- Soluble Fish – Nugget Sauces EP (1995)
- Pezz – Dudebox EP (1996)
- Pezz – Watoosh! LP (1998)
- Billy Talent – Try Honesty (2001)
- Billy Talent – Billy Talent (2003)
- Billy Talent – Billy Talent II (2006)
- Billy Talent – Billy Talent III (2009)
- Billy Talent – Dead Silence (2012)
- Billy Talent – Hits (2014)
- Billy Talent – Kingdom of Zod (2014)
- Billy Talent – Afraid of Heights (2016)
- Billy Talent – Crisis of Faith (2022)

== Production credits ==
- Pezz – Demoluca demo (1994, producer)
- Soluble Fish – Nugget Sauces EP (1995, producer)
- Billy Talent – Billy Talent II (2006, co-produced with Gavin Brown)
- Die Mannequin – Slaughter Daughter EP (2007, producer)
- Operation M.D. – Buried at Sea single (2010, producer)
- Billy Talent – Dead Silence (2012, producer)
- The Lazys – Black Rebel single (2015, producer)
- Say Yes – Real Life Trash Mag (2015, co-produced with Eric Ratz)
- Billy Talent – Afraid of Heights (2016, producer)
- The Lazys – Tropical Hazards (2018, co-produced with Eric Ratz)
- Billy Talent – Crisis of Faith (2022, producer)
