= Benjamin Kowalewicz =

Canadian singer (born 1975)

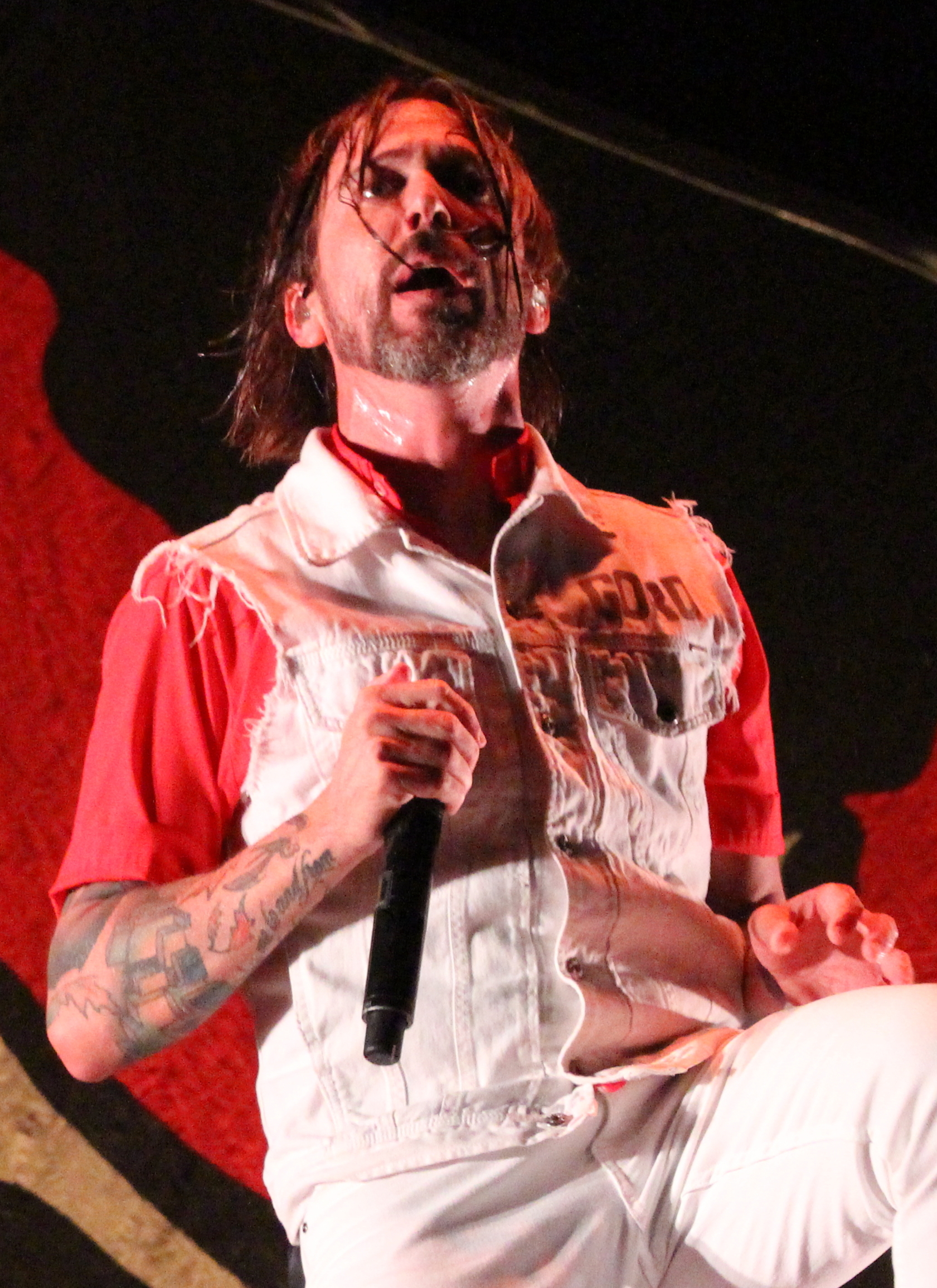
- Kowalewicz with Billy Talent in 2017

Background information
- Born: Benjamin Ian Kowalewicz; Montreal, Quebec, Canada
- Origin: Streetsville, Ontario, Canada
- Genres: Alternative rock; punk rock; post-hardcore
- Occupations: Singer; songwriter
- Member of: Billy Talent

Benjamin Ian Kowalewicz (/ˌkɒvæˈlɛvɪtʃ/) is a Canadian singer, best known as the lead vocalist of the punk band Billy Talent.

== Early life ==
Of Polish descent, Kowalewicz was born in Montreal and grew up in its Pierrefonds borough. When he was 11, he and his family moved to Streetsville, Ontario, now part of Mississauga. He attended Our Lady of Mount Carmel Secondary School, where he was a drummer in a band named To Each His Own.

== Career ==
In To Each His Own, Kowalewicz met Jonathan Gallant. Kowalewicz moved from drummer to vocals and rhythm guitar, and Aaron Solowoniuk was recruited to play drums. The three would then meet Ian D'Sa to form a band called Pezz. Pezz released their first album, Watoosh!, in 1998. After being threatened with a lawsuit by an American band who was also using the name Pezz, Kowalewicz suggested the name Billy Talent, taken from a character from Michael Turner's Hard Core Logo. Kowalewicz focused his work on vocals only, and Billy Talent was born. In this time, Kowalewicz worked in a number of positions at Toronto radio station 102.1 the Edge, as an assistant for The Ongoing History of New Music host Alan Cross, to contribute funds towards Billy Talent's first album.

Kowalewicz is featured in the song "Smiling Politely" by Cancer Bats from their album Hail Destroyer. He was featured in the song "Wake Up the Town" by Anti-Flag, which was a bonus track on their 2008 album The Bright Lights of America.

His home in the Parkdale neighbourhood of Toronto was featured on the Canadian home decorating show Designer Guys. The episode is entitled "Punk Meets Traditional". Kowalewicz can also play guitar and drums. He wrote drums for "The Ex" which appears on Billy Talent's self-titled album.

Kowalewicz provided guest vocals for Rammstein guitarist Richard Kruspe's side project Emigrate. He provided co-lead vocals for the song "1234" on Emigrate's album A Million Degrees, as well as performing in the song's music video with a cameo appearance from Billy Talent bandmate Ian D'Sa.

== Discography ==
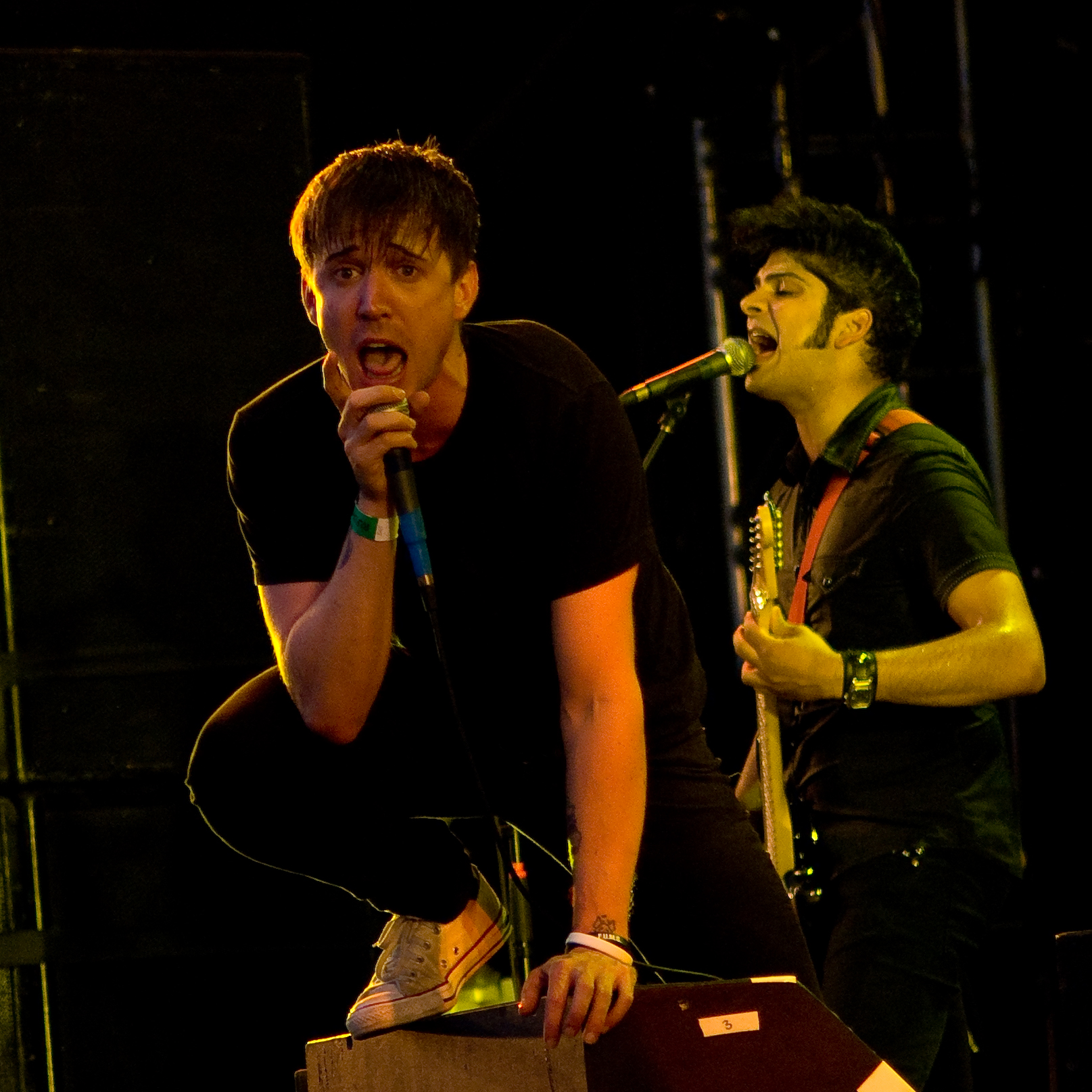
Kowalewicz (left) and Ian D'Sa performing in 2007

=== Billy Talent ===
- Billy Talent (2003)
- Billy Talent II (2006)
- Billy Talent III (2009)
- Dead Silence (2012)
- Afraid of Heights (2016)
- Crisis of Faith (2022)

=== Guest appearances ===
- Anti-Flag – "Wake Up the Town" on The Bright Lights of America (2008)
- Cancer Bats – "Smiling Politely" on Hail Destroyer (2008)
- K-OS - "Say It Ain't So (originally by Weezer)" on Much Music Presents: k-os Live (2011)
- Emigrate – "1234" on A Million Degrees (2018)
