= Covenant Awards =

Canadian gospel music awards

- Awarded for: Outstanding achievements in the Christian music industry
- Country: Canada
- Presented by: GMA Canada
- First award: 1974
- Website: gmacanada.ca

The Covenant Awards are awarded to the Canadian gospel music industry by GMA Canada, the Gospel Music Association of Canada. The association is a nonprofit organization whose mission is to promote the growth and ministry of Christian music in Canada. The ceremonies are held annually in cities across the nation.

== History ==
GMA Canada created the Covenant Awards in 1974 in Ontario. At the beginning, it was mostly for gospel music. Over the years, all styles of Contemporary Christian music have been included.

In 2008 the association released a special three-CD collection to commemorate its 30th anniversary, the GMA Canada presents 30th Anniversary Collection.

== Awards ==
Covenant Awards are handed out in over 45 categories. One of the most prestigious awards given is the GMA Canada Lifetime Achievement Award.

== Categories ==
- Adult Contemporary Artist of the Year
- Artist(e) francophone de l’annee
- Children's Artist of the Year
- Country Artist of the Year
- Gospel Artist of the Year
- Indigenous Artist of the Year
- Instrumental Artist of the Year
- Pop Artist of the Year
- Rock Artist of the Year
- Worship Artist of the Year
- Album of the Year
- Artist of the Year
- Breakthrough Artist of the Year
- Canadian Christian Song of the Year
- Male Vocalist of the Year
- Female Vocalist of the Year
- Group of the Year
- Live Music Artist of the Year – Online or In-person
- Musical Collaboration of the Year
- Producer of the Year
- Radio or Podcast Personality/Team of the Year
- Video of the Year
- Visual Designer of the Year
- Adult Contemporary Song of the Year
- Country Song of the Year
- Folk Song of the Year
- Gospel Song of the Year
- Pop Song of the Year
- Rap Song of the Year
- Rock Song of the Year
- Seasonal Song of the Year
- Worship Song of the Year

== GMA Canada 2001 Covenant Award Winners / 23rd annual ==
Winners

- Lifetime Achievement Award: Roger & Shirley Pavy of Lighthouse Ministry in Song
- Overcomers Award Recipient: Margaret Williams
- Favourite Female Artist of the Year: Marlene O'Neill
- Favourite Male Artist of the Year: Andrew Martin
- Favourite Instrumentalist Artist of the Year: Warren B. Parker
- Favourite Live Band Artist of the Year: Canada's Double Portion
- Favourite Vocal Group Artist of the Year: Parker Trio
- Favourite Song of the Year: "With Wings As Eagles" – Warren and Shannon Parker
- Contemporary Gospel Album of the Year: Love in the Ruins, Hope in the Wasteland – Lianna Klassen
- Country Album of the Year: Out of His Great Love – Canada's Double Portion
- Inspirational Album of the Year: Just Him, Just Hymns – Andrew Martin
- Pop Album of the Year: Mark Masri – Mark Masri
- Southern Gospel Album of the Year: Encore! – Marlene O'Neill, Joan Elliot
- Contemporary Gospel Song of the Year: "Dwell in the House" – Mark Masri
- Country Song of the Year: "Roll Up Your Sleeves" – David Armstrong
- Pop Song of the Year: "Take My Hand" – Mark Masri, Madeline Stone and Bernie Herms
- Rock Song of the Year: "Out of the Way" – Dan Pascal, Julia Churchill and Adam McKechnie
- Southern Gospel Song of the Year: "Just As I Am" – Rena Gaile
- Disc Jockey/Christian Radio Program: Ben Davy – "The Breakfast Club" (Life 100.3)

== GMA Canada 2002 Covenant Award Winners / 24th Annual ==
Winners

- Children's Album of the Year: Everybody Needs Good Manners – Judi Vankevich – The Manners Lady
- Country Album of the Year: Simple Man – Trevor Baker
- Francophone Pop Album of the Year: Juste Au Bon Moment – Tabitha Lemaire
- Inspirational Album of the Year: Because of Love – Kelita
- Instrumental Album of the Year: Anointed Pan – Winston Dayal
- Pop/Contemporary Album of the Year: Waiting For Aidan – Steve Bell
- Rock Album of the Year: Downhere – downhere
- Southern Gospel Album of the Year: I Need You – Andrew Martin
- Urban/Contemporary Gospel Album of the Year: Instrument of Praise – Toronto Mass Choir
- Children's Song of the Year: "The Golden Rule Rap" – Judi Vankevich – The Manners Lady
- Contemporary Gospel Song of the Year: "No Way" – SAJ
- Country Song of the Year: "Through Your Eyes" – Jamus Dorey, songwriter (Four for the Lord)
- Francophone Song of the Year: "Les Roches Crieront" – Luc Gingras
- Inspirational Song of the Year: "Unto The Lord" – Debbie Zepick
- Modern Rock/Alternative Song of the Year: "Freedom" – Manafest
- Pop/Contemporary Song of the Year: "Dance Like No One's Watching" – Carolyn Arends
- Rap/Hip Hop Song of the Year: "Alright" – Promise D'Apostle
- Rock Song of the Year: "Larger Than Life" – downhere
- Southern Gospel Song of the Year: "I Know My God Cares For Me" – Andrew Martin, Ken Harden
- Traditional Gospel Song of the Year: "O Canada" – Trevor Baker
- Disc Jockey/Radio Program of the Year: Bobby Sunday – "Prayz Joynt" (JOY 1250 AM/CJYE)

== GMA Canada 2003 Covenant Award Winners / 25th Annual ==
Winners

- Children's Album of the Year: Cry Out – God Rocks!
- Country/Bluegrass Album of the Year: Love Holds On – Mark Mallett
- Francophone Album of the Year: Expression De Louanges – Eglise Sans Frontieres & Friends
- Inspirational Album of the Year: We've Been Waiting For You – Carolyn Arends
- Modern Rock/Alternative Album of the Year: So Much for Substitutes – downhere
- Pop/Contemporary Album of the Year: New Day – Janelle
- Praise & Worship Album of the Year: Forward To Forever – Jody Cross
- Southern Gospel Album of the Year: Love Remains – The Parker Trio
- Children's Song of the Year: "Rocks Cry Out" – Bruce Stacey
- Country/Bluegrass Song of the Year: "Makin' My Way" – Mark Mallett
- Francophone Song of the Year: "Tu Es Le Chant" – Tabitha Lemaire
- Inspirational Song of the Year: "His Hand Upon You" – Jody Cross
- Modern Rock/Alternative Song of the Year: "What It's Like" – downhere
- Pop/Contemporary Song of the Year: "I Believe in You" – The Lapointes
- Praise & Worship Song of the Year: "Humbled" – Jody Cross
- Southern Gospel – Song of the Year: (tie)
  – "Thank God For Calvary" – The Parker Trio
  – "You Alone" – Canada's Double Portion

== GMA Canada 2004 Covenant Award Winners / 26th Annual ==
Winners

- Lifetime Achievement Award: George Beverly Shea
- Female Vocalist of the Year: Aileen Lombardo
- Male Vocalist of the Year: Greg Sczebel
- Group of the Year: Three Season Ant
- New Artist of the Year: Three Season Ant
- Contemporary Gospel Album of the Year: Keep on Standing – Krystaal
- Country/Bluegrass/Southern Gospel Album of the Year: Hold On – Debbie Forsyth
- Inspirational Album of the Year: Where You Remain – Ali Matthews
- Modern Rock/Alternative Album of the Year: 2 Days After Yesterday – Three Season Ant
- Pop/Contemporary Album of the Year: Taken – Raylene Scarrott
- Rap/Hip Hop/Dance Album of the Year: Red Letterz – Fresh I.E.
- Song of the Year: "If I Believe" – Aileen Lombardo. Kerroy Williams, songwriter
- Contemporary Song of the Year: "Under His Wings" – Aileen Lombardo. Aileen Lombardo, Kerroy Williams, Joy Brown, Roy Oommen, Carmon Barry, Mark Masri, songwriters
- Country/Bluegrass/Southern Gospel Song of the Year: "Hunger Mountain" – Ali Matthews
- Inspirational Song of the Year: "If I Believe" – Aileen Lombardo. Kerroy Williams, songwriter
- Modern Rock/Alternative Song of the Year: "Refusing" – Stereotrap
- Pop/Contemporary Song of the Year: "Thrive" – Bec Abbot
- Praise & Worship Song of the Year: "I Rest" – Three Season Ant, songwriters
- Rap/Hip Hop/Dance Song of the Year: "Lights Are Comin' On" – Greg Sczebel
- Urban Song of the Year: "Noah" – Krystaal

== GMA Canada 2005 Covenant Award Winners / 27th Annual ==
Winners

- Lifetime Achievement Award: Tommy Hunter
- Artist of the Year: Thousand Foot Krutch
- Female Vocalist of the Year: Amanda Falk
- Male Vocalist of the Year: Brian Doerksen
- Group of the Year: Thousand Foot Krutch
- New Artist of the Year: Gaetz Ave
- Children's Album of the Year: Movers And Shakers – Outside The Lines
- Contemporary Gospel Album of the Year: Truth – Hetti-Marie
- Country/Bluegrass Album of the Year: Let Go – Cheryl Dunn
- Francophone Album of the Year: Emmène-Moi – Tabitha Lemaire
- Inspirational Album of the Year: Bare My Soul – Kristina
- Instrumental Album of the Year: Road To Home – Brian Thiessen
- Modern Rock Album of the Year: The Art of Breaking – Thousand Foot Krutch
- Pop/Contemporary Album of the Year: Closer to You – Carried Away
- Praise And Worship Album of the Year: Today – Brian Doerksen
- Rap/Hip Hop Album of the Year: Epiphany – Manafest
- Rock Album of the Year: Grasping For Hope in the Darkness – Critical Mass
- Seasonal Album of the Year: An Irrational Season – Carolyn Arends
- Southern Gospel Album of the Year: Live in Havana – Parker Trio
- Special Events/Compilation Album of the Year: Sea to Sea: Filled With Your Glory, Producer Martin Smith
- Song of the Year: "I Know" – Carried Away
- Aboriginal Song of the Year: "Carry Me" – Shezza
- Children's Song of the Year: "Movers And Shakers" – Outside The Lines, Derek Elliotson, songwriters
- Country/Bluegrass Song of the Year: "That's What I Love About Jesus" – Paul Brandt
- Francophone Song of the Year: "Tout c'que je veux" – Tabitha Lemaire
- Inspirational Song of the Year: "Getting Ready For Glory" – Carolyn Arends
- Instrumental Song of the Year: "Ern's Waltz" – Stephanie Mainville
- Modern Rock Song of the Year: "Be My Escape" – Relient K
- Pop/Contemporary Song of the Year: "Here I Go" – Gaetz Ave
- Praise And Worship Song of the Year: "Today" – Brian Doerksen. Brian Doerksen and Sandra Gage songwriters
- Rap/Hip Hop Song of the Year: "Let It Go" – Manafest. Manafest, Gerard Thomas, Adam Messinger, Aubrey Noronha, Nasri, songwriters
- Rock Song of the Year: "No Turning Back" – Travis Blackmore, Robin Ghosh, Mike Kidd, songwriters (Black Talon)
- Seasonal Song of the Year: "On Angels' Wings" – Ali Matthews
- Southern Gospel Song of the Year: "My Faith, My All", The Master's Four. Wendy Pound, songwriter
- Urban Song of the Year: "Everybody" – Greg Sczebel
- Producer of the Year: Glen Teeple

== GMA Canada 2006 Covenant Award Winners / 28th Annual ==
Winners

- Lifetime Achievement Award: Connie Scott
- Artist of the Year: Brian Doerksen
- Female Vocalist of the Year: Amanda Falk
- Male Vocalist of the Year: Brian Doerksen
- Group of the Year: Starfield
- New Artist of the Year: The Silent
- Album of the Year: Beauty in the Broken – Starfield
- Country/Bluegrass Album of the Year: Across The Miles – Canada's Double Portion
- Folk/Roots Album of the Year: Window of Light – Ali Matthews
- Francophone Album of the Year: Oasis – Andréanne Lafleur
- Hard Music Album of the Year: More Than Watchmen for the Morning – Means
- Inspirational Album of the Year: Hymns: A Modern Translation – Sean and Aimee Dayton
- Instrumental Album of the Year: Another Place – Andrew Bartley
- Jazz/Blues Album of the Year: Beginnings Live – The Mike Janzen Trio
- Modern Rock/Alternative Album of the Year: Smile, It's the End of the World – Hawk Nelson
- Pop/Contemporary Album of the Year: Beauty in the Broken – Starfield
- Praise And Worship Album of the Year: Rekindle – Jody Cross
- Rap/Hip Hop Album of the Year: The Proletariat LP – The Joe
- Rock Album of the Year: Wide-Eyed and Mystified – downhere
- Seasonal Album of the Year: Christmas Presence – Holy Trinity Anglican Church
- Southern Gospel Album of the Year: Here There Or in the Air – The Torchmen Quartet
- Special Events/Compilation Album of the Year: Sea to Sea: I See The Cross – Producer Martin Smith
- Traditional Gospel Album of the Year: The Live Experience – Toronto Mass Choir
- Urban/R&B/Soul Album of the Year: Who Is Like The Lord – Hiram Joseph
- Song of the Year: "Son of God" – Tim Neufeld, Jon Neufeld, Gordon Cochran, songwriters
- Recorded Song of the Year: "A Better Way" – downhere
- Aboriginal Song of the Year: "I Will Exalt" – Shezza
- Children's Song of the Year: "Set An Example" – Bruce Stacey, Ian Tanner
- Country/Bluegrass Song of the Year: "Sweeter Than Wine" – Ali Matthews
- Folk/Roots Song of the Year: "Poised for a Fall" – Ali Matthews
- Francophone Song of the Year: "Le Reflet De Toi" – Andréanne Lafleur
- Hard Music Song of the Year: "You Will Become" – Means
- Inspirational Song of the Year: "When You Shepherd Me" – Brian Doerksen
- Instrumental Song of the Year: "Dancing in the Light" – Fred Cacciotti
- Jazz/Blues Song of the Year: "Marooned" – Sandy Foster
- Modern Rock/Alternative Song of the Year: "Only Hope" – Everyother, songwriters
- Pop/Contemporary Song of the Year: "Not So Hip" – Bec Abbot, Carolyn Arends
- Praise And Worship Song of the Year: "Lord of Every Thing" – Jon Buller
- Rap/Hip Hop Song of the Year: "World Vision" – Fresh I.E.
- Rock Song of the Year: "The More" – downhere
- Seasonal Song of the Year: "Brand New Miracle" – Ali Matthews, Rick Francis, songwriters
- Southern Gospel Song of the Year: "Prayer Changes Things" – Darlene Lemmon, songwriter
- Traditional Gospel Song of the Year: "Wonderful" – Londa Larmond, Jason Larmond, songwriters
- Urban/R&B/Soul Song of the Year: "Shake The Dust" – Adé, Darren Sedor, songwriters
- DVD of the Year: Rez The Rock That Rolled! – God Rocks! BibleToons
- Video of the Year: "Move" – Thousand Foot Krutch
- CD/DVD Artwork Design of the Year: Pollyanna's Attic – Carolyn Arends. Graphic Design by Brent Flink for Indivisual Design Inc.
- Producer of the Year: Stephen Rendall

== GMA Canada 2007 Covenant Award Winners / 29th Annual ==
Winners

- Lifetime Achievement Award: Hokus Pick
- Blessings Fan Choice Award: Starfield
- Artist of the Year: Brian Doerksen
- Female Vocalist of the Year: Amanda Falk
- Male Vocalist of the Year: Brian Doerksen
- Group of the Year: Starfield
- New Artist of the Year: Newworldson
- Album of the Year: Holy God – Brian Doerksen
- Country/Bluegrass Album of the Year: Broken Borders – High Valley
- Folk/Roots Album of the Year: Roots Revolution – Newworldson
- Francophone Album of the Year: Peut-Etre – The Kry
- Hard Music Album of the Year: not awarded in 2007
- Inspirational Album of the Year: Free To Worship – Evangeline Inman
- Instrumental Album of the Year: House of Peace – Brian Thiessen
- Jazz/Blues Album of the Year: Destination Unknown – Adam Padfield
- Modern Rock/Alternative Album of the Year: Five Score and Seven Years Ago – Relient K
- Pop/Contemporary Album of the Year: Searching – Sebastian Demrey
- Praise And Worship Album of the Year: Holy God – Brian Doerksen
- Rap/Hip Hop Album of the Year: The Proletariat LP – The Joe
- Rock Album of the Year: Adam Farrell – Adam Farrell
- Seasonal Album of the Year: A Gift – Paul Brandt
- Southern Gospel Album of the Year: An Evening with the Torchmen: Recorded Live at Crossroads Centre – The Torchmen Quartet
- Special Events/Compilation Album of the Year: Sea to Sea: For Endless Days – Producer Martin Smith
- Traditional Gospel Album of the Year: not awarded in 2007
- Urban/R&B/Soul Album of the Year: Oh My Soul – Kathie Morrow
- Song of the Year: "Holy God" – Brian Doerksen
- Recorded Song of the Year: "The Hand That Holds The World" – Starfield
- Aboriginal Song of the Year: "Meegwetch" – Lil' Disciples, R. Wilson and E. Lee songwriters
- Children's Song of the Year: "The Lord Is My Rock" – God Rocks! Bibletoons, Bruce Stacey songwriter
- Country/Bluegrass Song of the Year: "Back To You" – High Valley, Brad Rempel and Brian Barrett songwriters
- Folk/Roots Song of the Year: "Everybody Wants Everything" – Carolyn Arends
- Francophone Song of the Year: "Merveilleux" – The Kry
- Hard Music Song of the Year: "Lifegiver" – Stereotrap
- Inspirational Song of the Year: "Come to the Cross" – Stephanie Israelson. Stephanie Isrealson and Andrew Horrocks songwriters
- Instrumental Song of the Year: "Easter Morning Sunrise" – Debbie Fortnum
- Jazz/Blues Song of the Year: "Loud and Clear" – Christine Magee
- Modern Rock/Alternative Song of the Year: "Must Have Done Something Right" – Relient K
- Pop/Contemporary Song of the Year: "I Want You" – Carried Away
- Praise And Worship Song of the Year: "Holy God" – Brian Doerksen
- Rap/Hip Hop Song of the Year: "Bounce" – Manafest
- Rock Song of the Year: "The Hand That Holds The World" – Starfield. Tim Neufeld, Jon Neufeld, Matt Bronleewe and Jason Ingram songwriters
- Seasonal Song of the Year: "A Gift" – Paul Brandt
- Southern Gospel Song of the Year: "God's Amazing Grace" – The Master's Four
- Traditional Gospel Song of the Year: not awarded in 2007
- Urban/R&B/Soul Song of the Year: "Shine" – Drew Brown
- Music DVD of the Year: Rock-A-Bye Christmas – God Rocks! Bibletoons
- Video of the Year: "Push" – Christine Evans
- CD/DVD Artwork Design of the Year: Open – Charlene Lewis, Design by Wesley Booker
- Producer of the Year: Roy Salmond

== GMA Canada 2008 Covenant Award Winners / 30th Annual ==
Winners

- Lifetime Achievement Award: Rhythm & News
- Blessings Fan Choice Award: Jimmy Lalla
- Artist of the Year: Starfield
- Female Vocalist of the Year: Amanda Falk
- Male Vocalist of the Year: Jon Bauer
- Group of the Year: Starfield
- New Artist of the Year: University of Toronto Gospel Choir
- Album of the Year: I Will Go – Starfield
- Aboriginal Album of the Year: The Good Road – Cheryl Bear
- Children's Album of the Year: Trust And Hope in the Lord – God Rocks! BibleToons
- Choir Album of the Year: A cappella – Rocky Mountain College Choir
- Classical/Traditional Album of the Year: The Hymn Project – Buller, Balzer & Aichele
- Country/Bluegrass Album of the Year: In The Sweet By And By – Jayc Harold
- Folk/Roots Album of the Year: Salvation Station – Newworldson
- Francophone Album of the Year: Aimer Comme Toi – Claude Whiting
- Gospel Album of the Year: Send Me – University of Toronto Gospel Choir
- Hard Music Album of the Year: Great White Whale – Secret and Whisper
- Inspirational Album of the Year: Fountain of Life – 4Given
- Instrumental Album of the Year: What A Gig That Will Be – Bruce Dougall
- Jazz/Blues Album of the Year: The Essence of Life – Zoë Theodorou
- Modern Rock/Alternative Album of the Year: To The Living – Jay and the Lovebirds
- Modern Worship Album of the Year: I Will Go – Starfield
- Pop/Contemporary Album of the Year: Colors And Sounds – Article One
- Praise And Worship Album of the Year: Empty & Beautiful – Matt Maher
- Rap/Hip Hop Album of the Year: Lockjaw – Fresh I.E.
- Rock Album of the Year: Reset & Rewind – Manic Drive
- Seasonal Album of the Year: This Christmas – Jacob Moon
- Southern Gospel Album of the Year: I Believe – Three And Company
- Special Events/Compilation Album of the Year: GMA Canada presents 30th Anniversary Collection – Producer Martin Smith
- Urban/R&B/Soul Album of the Year: Seguro En Ti – Paulis Sanchez
- Song of the Year: "Love Is The Anchor" – Greg Sczebel
- Recorded Song of the Year: "Hosanna" – Starfield
- Aboriginal Song of the Year: "Residential School Song" – Cheryl Bear
- Children's Song of the Year: "The Plans I Have" – Ian Tanner (God Rocks! BibleToons)
- Choir Song of the Year: "I Surrender" – Stephen Lewis, University of Toronto Gospel Choir
- Classical/Traditional Song of the Year: "I Will Give You All The Praise" – 4Given – Monica Cota, Evangeline Inman and Mark Inman songwriters
- Country/Bluegrass Song of the Year: "The Prayer Song" – Steve Rain & Friends
- Folk/Roots Song of the Year: "On The Blue" – Joel Augé
- Francophone Song of the Year: "Pour Te Louer" – Catherine Grenier
- Gospel Song of the Year: "Because of You" – Ryan Resmer
- Hard Music Song of the Year: "Xoxoxo" – Secret and Whisper
- Inspirational Song of the Year: "Trust" – Adam Padfield
- Instrumental Song of the Year: "The Cry of Bethlehem" – Ali Matthews
- Jazz/Blues Song of the Year: "I Believed It" – Zoë Theodorou. Zoë Theodorou, Eric Boseman, Viviane Cardinal, Rodney Hunter, Daniel Martin, Rique Pantoje and Gavin Sorochan songwriters
- Modern Rock/Alternative Song of the Year: "Anyways" – Everyother
- Modern Worship Song of the Year: "Faithful Forever" – Elias Dummer
- Pop/Contemporary Song of the Year: "Beautiful" – Amanda Falk (Amanda Lindsey Cook. Malynda Zacharias, Marshall Zacharias and Amanda Falk songwriters
- Praise And Worship Song of the Year: "Reign in Us" – (Starfield). Ben Glover, Jon Neufeld and Tim Neufeld songwriters
- Rap/Hip Hop Song of the Year: "Heat" – Rob James, (Fresh I.E.)
- Rock Song of the Year: "Alone Tonight" – Kiros
- Seasonal Song of the Year: "The Cry of Bethlehem" – Ali Matthews
- Southern Gospel Song of the Year: "Walk Out on the Water" – One Heart. Don Wilkie songwriter
- Urban/R&B/Soul Song of the Year: "Me Tienes (You Got Me)" – Paulis Sanchez. Paulis Sanchez, Terverius Black, Sean Simmonds and Kelvin Wooten songwriters
- Music DVD of the Year: One – Victory Christian Centre
- Video of the Year: "Eleven Regrets" – Manic Drive
- CD/DVD Artwork Design of the Year: The Hymn Project – Buller, Balzer & Aichele. Brian Kauste songwriter
- Producer of the Year: Dave Zeglinski and Steve Bell

== GMA Canada 2009 Covenant Award Winners / 31st Annual ==
Winners

- Lifetime Achievement Award: Gerry Scott
- Blessings Fan Choice Award: Matt Brouwer
- Artist of the Year: downhere
- Female Vocalist of the Year: Janelle
- Male Vocalist of the Year: Joel Augé
- Group of the Year: Newworldson
- New Artist of the Year: Chris Bray
- Album of the Year: Ending Is Beginning – downhere
- Children's Album of the Year: Giver of Grace – Jon Bauer
- Classical/Traditional Album of the Year: Fields of Gold – Jeffrey Allan Sawatzky
- Country/Bluegrass Album of the Year: You Carry Me – Brenda Janz
- Folk/Roots Album of the Year: No Sudden Movements – Corey Doak
- Francophone Album of the Year: Authenticité – Andréanne (Andréanne Lafleur)
- Gospel Album of the Year: Ain't That Good News – Black Pioneer Heritage Singers
- Inspirational Album of the Year: Evangeline Inman & Women Who Worship
- Instrumental Album of the Year: A Quiet Afternoon – Tisha Murvihill
- Jazz/Blues Album of the Year: Mombâcho – Mike Janzen Trio
- Modern Rock/Alternative Album of the Year: The Bird and the Bee Sides/The Nashville Tennis EP – Relient K
- Modern Worship Album of the Year: Love Is A Fire – Fridays Cry
- Pop/Contemporary Album of the Year: Ending Is Beginning – downhere
- Praise And Worship Album of the Year: Glory – Klaus
- Rap/Hip Hop Album of the Year: More Than Music – Promise
- Rock Album of the Year: Living And Surviving – Red Umbrella
- Seasonal Album of the Year: Looking For Christmas – Ali Matthews
- Southern Gospel Album of the Year: It Takes Faith – Hunter Brothers
- Special Events/Compilation Album of the Year: Women's Journey of Faith – BU Girl
- Urban/R&B/Soul Album of the Year: Divine Conversations Volume I – Jennifer Meade
- Song of the Year: "Here I Am" – downhere
- Recorded Song of the Year: "Here I Am" – downhere
- Children's Song of the Year: "Show Me The Way" – The Toronto Children's Concert Choir
- Choir Song of the Year: "Wonderful" – Evangeline Inman & Women Who Worship. Evangeline Inman and Mark Inman songwriters
- Classical/Traditional Song of the Year: "Alleluia, Alleluia (Psalm 84)" – Gemma and Co. (Karin Dart, Cathy Hardy)
- Country/Bluegrass Song of the Year: "King of the World" – Point of Grace. Cindy Morgan songwriter
- Folk/Roots Song of the Year: "The Other Side" – Matt Brouwer feat Amy Grant and Vince Gill. Matt Brouwer songwriter
- Francophone Song of the Year: "Comblé" – Andréanne (Andréanne Lafleur)
- Gospel Song of the Year: "O Taste And See" – Evangeline Inman & Women Who Worship
- Inspirational Song of the Year: "The Beggar Who Gives Alms" – downhere
- Instrumental Song of the Year: "Eastern Grace" – Jasmin Gibb
- Jazz/Blues Song of the Year: "Embrace The Mystery" – Steve Bell, Gord Johnson songwriter
- Modern Rock/Alternative Song of the Year: "Live Life Loud" – Hawk Nelson (Hawk Nelson)
- Modern Worship Song of the Year: "No Mountain" – Fridays Cry
- Pop/Contemporary Song of the Year: "Here I Am" – downhere
- Praise And Worship Song of the Year: "It's Time for the Reign of God" – Brian Doerksen. Brian Doerksen and Steve Mitchinson songwriters
- Rap/Hip Hop Song of the Year: "4-3-2-1" – Manafest. Manafest (Chris Greenwood) and Adam Messinger songwriters
- Rock Song of the Year: "My Last Amen" – downhere
- Seasonal Song of the Year: "How Many Kings" – downhere
- Southern Gospel Song of the Year: "God's Game Plan" – Hunter Brothers
- Urban/R&B/Soul Song of the Year: "You" – Fresh I.E.
- Music DVD of the Year: God Rocks! The Music Videos – God Rocks!
- Video of the Year: "Crystal" – Fresh I.E.
- CD/DVD Artwork Design of the Year: Find Me/Blessed Are the Lost Ones – David John Hensman
- Producer of the Year: Philip Janz

== GMA Canada 2010 Covenant Award Winners / 32nd Annual ==
Winners

- Lifetime Achievement Award: Arlen Salte
- Blessings Fan Choice Award: Greg Sczebel
- Song of the Year: "Hold Us Together" – Matt Maher. Matt Maher and Steve Wilson songwriters
- Recorded Song of the Year: "There Is A Way" – Newworldson
- Producer of the Year: Andrew Horrocks
- New Artist of the Year: Junkyard Poets
- Male Vocalist of the Year: Greg Sczebel
- Female Vocalist of the Year: Stephanie Israelson
- Group of the Year: downhere
- Artist of the Year: Starfield
- Album of the Year: Alive Again – Matt Maher
- CD/DVD Artwork Design of the Year: Love Was Here First – Carolyn Arends. Brian Kauste songwriter
- Urban/R&B/Soul Song of the Year: "Heaven" – Jason Ray
- Urban/R&B/Soul Album of the Year: Anchored Roots – Chelsea Nisbett
- Special Events/Compilation of the Year: Sea to Sea: Christmas – Producer Martin Smith
- Southern Gospel Song of the Year: "Gonna Get My Feet Wet" – The Torchmen Quartet. David Randall songwriter
- Southern Gospel Album of the Year: I'll Follow You – Father's Daughter
- Seasonal Song of the Year: "Christmas in Our Hearts" – downhere
- Seasonal Album of the Year: How Many Kings: Songs for Christmas – downhere
- Rock Song of the Year: "Forward Motion" – Thousand Foot Krutch
- Rock Album of the Year: Welcome to the Masquerade – Thousand Foot Krutch
- Rap/Hip Hop Song of the Year: "Homeless" – Fresh I.E. Robert Wilson and Byron Foster songwriters
- Rap/Hip Hop Album of the Year: The Chase – Manafest
- Praise And Worship Song of the Year: "Alive Again" – Matt Maher. Matt Maher and Jason Ingram songwriters
- Praise And Worship Album of the Year: Alive Again – Matt Maher
- Pop/Contemporary Song of the Year: "There Is A Way" – Newworldson Newworldson and Tawgs Salter songwriters
- Pop/Contemporary Album of the Year: Love & the Lack Thereof – Greg Sczebel
- Modern Worship Song of the Year: "Glory Is Rising" – Starfield. Chris Janz, Tim Neufeld, Jon Neufeld and Ian Eskelin songwriters
- Modern Worship Album of the Year: The Saving One – Starfield
- Modern Rock/Alternative Song of the Year: "Never Enough" – Hawk Nelson. Hawk Nelson and Trevor McNevan songwriters
- Modern Rock/Alternative Album of the Year: Live Life Loud – Hawk Nelson
- Jazz/Blues Song of the Year: "No Compromise" – Sean Spicer, featuring Mike Janzen
- Instrumental Song of the Year: "Passion" – Trevor Dick and the 5th String Blvd. Band. Trevor Dick songwriter
- Instrumental Album of the Year: Yahweh – Trevor Dick and the 5th String Blvd. Band.
- Inspirational Song of the Year: "Hold On" – Mark Masri. Mark Masri, Adam Crossley and John Acosta songwriters
- Inspirational Album of the Year: Into Your Light – The Wiebes
- Hard Music Song of the Year: "Bring Me To Life" – Thousand Foot Krutch
- Gospel/Caribbean Album of the Year: Life – Zamar
- Francophone Song of the Year: "Que Tout Ce Qui Respire" – Geneviève Falleur. Geneviève Falleur and Sebastian Demrey songwriters
- Francophone Album of the Year: Dès Le Réveil – Geneviève Falleur
- Folk-Roots Song of the Year: "Be Still" – Carolyn Arends
- Folk-Roots Album of the Year: Newworldson – Newworldson
- Country/Bluegrass Song of the Year: "Holding On" – Denise Gerein
- Country/Bluegrass Album of the Year: Blessings – Barb Prosser Winder
- Classical/Traditional Song of the Year: "Time" – Mark Masri feat Nita Whitaker. Mark Masri and Amy Sky songwriters
- Classical/Traditional Album of the Year: La Voce – Mark Masri
- Choir Song of the Year: "Walk in Jerusalem Just Like John" – Lincoln Tatem
- Children's Song of the Year: "Peace, Peace, Peace" – Dian Layton. Dian Layton and Lori Hubschmid songwriters
- Children's Album of the Year: God Rocks My World – God Rocks!
- Aboriginal Song of the Year: "Hand in Hand" – Yvonne St. Germaine
- Aboriginal Album of the Year: Roots – Dorothy Mae
- Video of the Year: "I Will Come" – Greg Sczebel
- Music DVD of the Year: God Rocks! Live in Miami – God Rocks!

== GMA Canada 2011 Covenant Award Winners / 33rd Annual ==
Winners

- Lifetime Achievement Award: Daniel Band
- Blessings Fan Choice Award: Tenore
- Song of the Year: "Let Me Rediscover You" – downhere
- Recorded Song of the Year: "Manifesto" – The City Harmonic
- Producer of the Year: Andrew Horrocks
- New Artist of the Year: The City Harmonic
- Male Vocalist of the Year: Matt Maher
- Female Vocalist of the Year: Ali Matthews
- Group of the Year: High Valley
- Artist of the Year: High Valley
- Album of the Year: Carry Me Home – Ali Matthews
- CD/DVD Artwork Design of the Year: Carry Me Home – Ali Matthews
- Urban/R&B/Soul Song of the Year: "Circling Numbers" – Manuela
- Urban/R&B/Soul Album of the Year: Songs From The Evolution of Gospel Music – Toronto Mass Choir
- Special Events/Compilation of the Year: Prodigal God – Brian Doerksen
- Seasonal Song of the Year: "What A Boy" – Stephanie Mainville (Stephanie Mainville)
- Seasonal Album of the Year: A Christmas Gift – Toronto Mass Choir
- Rock Song of the Year: "Crazy Love" – Hawk Nelson
- Rock Album of the Year: Crazy Love – Hawk Nelson
- Rap/Hip Hop Song of the Year: "Avalanche" – Manafest
- Rap/Hip Hop Album of the Year: Live in Concert – Manafest
- Praise And Worship Song of the Year: "Welcome to the Level Ground" – Brian Doerksen. Brian Doerksen and Paul Baloche songwriters
- Praise And Worship Album of the Year: Level Ground – Brian Doerksen
- Pop/Contemporary Song of the Year: "One Step Away" – WakeUp Starlight
- Pop/Contemporary Album of the Year: Two at a Time – downhere
- Modern Worship Song of the Year: "Manifesto" – The City Harmonic
- Modern Worship Album of the Year: Let Hope Arise – Chris Bray
- Modern Rock/Alternative Song of the Year: "Tonight" – Sky Terminal
- Modern Rock/Alternative Album of the Year: Lukewarm Love – Cities Under Fire
- Jazz/Blues Song of the Year: "There's No Escaping Spring" – Mike Janzen Trio
- Instrumental Song of the Year: "Rejoice in Hope" – Sean Spicer
- Instrumental Album of the Year: Olive Tree – Sean Spicer
- Inspirational Song of the Year: "Pursue Me" – Chris Bray
- Inspirational Album of the Year: Songs for the Journey: The Story Goes On – Lianna Klassen
- Gospel/Caribbean Song of the Year: "Oh Come All Ye Faithful" – Toronto Mass Choir
- Folk/Roots Song of the Year: "God Only Knows" – Ali Matthews
- Folk/Roots Album of the Year: TIE – The Last Goodbye – Rob Berg / Kindness – Steve Bell
- Country/Bluegrass Song of the Year: "A Father's Love (The Only Way He Knew How)" – High Valley
- Country/Bluegrass Album of the Year: High Valley – High Valley
- Classical/Traditional Song of the Year: "Sempre Vicino: Prayer For Peace" – Tenore
- Classical/Traditional Album of the Year: SING! Presents Tenore – Tenore
- Children's Song of the Year: "Giver of Grace" – Jon Bauer
- Aboriginal Song of the Year: "Tennessee Sky" – Yvonne St. Germaine
- Video of the Year: "A Father's Love (The Only Way He Knew How)" – High Valley
- Music DVD of the Year: Level Ground: The Live Experience – Brian Doerksen

== GMA Canada 2012 Covenant Award Winners / 34th Annual ==
Winners

- Lifetime Achievement Award: Toronto Mass Choir
- Blessings Fan Choice Award: Open Sky
- Aboriginal Song of the Year: "A' BA", Cheryl Bear
- Album of the Year: On the Altar of Love – downhere
- Artist of the Year: High Valley
- CD Artwork of the Year: The Color – The Color – Art Direction by Melanie Greenwood at Vision City
- Children's Album of the Year: Here We Go – Q-Town
- Children's Song of the Year: "Chasing After Me" – Jon Bauer
- Classical/Traditional Song of the Year: "Silent Night" – Sean and Aimee Dayton with Brian Doerksen
- Collaboration of the Year: "Join Together" by Scott Towaij with Amy Savin, Ali Matthews, Sean Dayton, Dana Marie, Chris Bray and Colin Bernard
- Country/Bluegrass Album of the Year: Love Is A Long Road – High Valley
- Country/Bluegrass Song of the Year: "Have I Told You I Love You Lately" – High Valley
- Female Vocalist of the Year: Ali Matthews
- Folk/Roots Album of the Year: Rebel Transmission – Newworldson
- Folk/Roots Song of the Year: "Worry" as recorded by Cindy Morgan
- Francophone Album of the Year: Heritage: Cantiques & Hymnes Volume II – Sebastian Demrey & Jimmy Lahaie
- Francophone Song of the Year: "L'Amour Manifeste" – Evaymé
- Gospel/Caribbean Album of the Year: Great Things – Londa Larmond
- Gospel/Caribbean Song of the Year: "Quoi qu'il arrive" – Jireh Gospel Choir
- Group of the Year: downhere
- Hard Rock/Alternative Album of the Year: Epic – Manic Drive
- Hard Rock/Alternative Song of the Year: "Alive" – The Color – James Shiels, Jordan Janzen, Gabe Boschmann and Jay Tooke songwriters
- Inspirational Album of the Year: The Hymns Collection – The Wiebes
- Inspirational Song Song of the Year: "Ocean" – Matt Brouwer
- Instrumental Album of the Year: Here Is Love – Marcel Preston and Jonathan Clarke
- Instrumental Song of the Year: "Lift Your Hands" – Rockn Ron Project
- Jazz/Blues Song of the Year: "The Lion" – Derek Gust
- Male Vocalist of the Year: Marc Martel
- Modern Worship Album of the Year: Everything in Color – Ben Cantelon
- Modern Worship Song of the Year: "The Kingdom" as recorded – Starfield
- New Artist of the Year: The Color
- Pop/Contemporary Album of the Year: The Love in Between – Matt Maher
- Pop/Contemporary Song of the Year: "Learning To Be The Light" – Newworldson
- Praise & Worship Album of the Year: Forevermore – Jon Bauer
- Praise & Worship Song of the Year: "I Have A Dream (It Feels Like Home)" – The City Harmonic
- Producer of the Year: Sebastian Demrey
- Rap/Hip Hop Album: City of Worship by Fresh I.E.
- Rap/Hip Hop Song of the Year: "God of This City" – Fresh I.E.
- Recorded Song of the Year: "Never Let You Go" – Manafest
- Rock/Modern Album of the Year: Until the Sun Comes Out Again – Open Sky
- Rock/Modern Rock Song of the Year: "War of Change" – Thousand Foot Krutch
- Seasonal Album of the Year: A Living Room Christmas – Sean and Aimee Dayton
- Seasonal Song of the Year: "Bethlehem" – Crosswalk With Ray Lyell
- Song of the Year: "Learning to Be the Light" – Newworldson
- Southern Gospel Album of the Year: Step Up – The Torchmen Quartet
- Southern Gospel Song of the Year: "I Wanna Go" – The Amundruds
- Special Events Album of the Year: Kingdom Come – Worship Victoria
- Urban/R&B/Soul Album of the Year: Beautiful Disaster – Fresh I.E.
- Urban/R&B/Soul/Song of the Year: "Shake Holy Spirit" – Newworldson
- Video of the Year: "Dans mon âme un beau soleil brille" – Sebastian Demrey & Jimmy Lahaie

== GMA Canada 2013 Covenant Award Winners / 35th Annual ==
- Lifetime Achievement Award: Servant
- Lifetime Achievement Award: Lando Klassen, House of James bookstore
- Blessings Fan Choice Award: Open Sky
- Album of the Year: Just As I Am – Paul Brandt
- Artist of the Year: Paul Brandt
- Female Vocalist of the Year: Ali Matthews
- Male Vocalist of the Year: Dan Bremnes
- New Artist of the Year: Love & the Outcome
- Producer of the Year: Andrew Horrocks
- Group of the Year: The City Harmonic
- Collaboration of the Year: "I Saw Jesus" – Ali Matthews, Joel Augé, Marcel Preston, Kevin Pauls and Matthew Grieves
- Song of the Year: "He Is With Us" – Love & the Outcome
- Recorded Song of the Year: "He Is With Us" – Love & the Outcome
- Inspirational Song of the Year: "I Saw Jesus" – Ali Matthews
- Children's Song of the Year: "Come And Save Us" – Jon Bauer
- Classical/Traditional Song of the Year: "O Come O Come Emmanuel" – Sean and Aimee Dayton
- Country/Bluegrass Song of the Year: "Just in Time" – Canada's Double Portion
- Folk/Roots Song of the Year: "Our Cozy Apartment" – Keith Kitchen
- Francophone Song of the Year: "Ma Promesse" – Olivier Voyer with Andreanne Lafleur
- Gospel/Caribbean Song of the Year: "Air That I Breathe" – Prosper & GPM
- Alternative Rock Song of the Year: "World at War" – Junkyard Poets
- Instrumental Song of the Year: "Do You Want It?" – Josh Lake
- Jazz/Blues Song of the Year: "Swing Low" – G.B. Roots
- Modern Rock Song of the Year: "Inside Out" – Anthem For Today
- Praise And Worship Song of the Year: "Holy (Wedding Day)" – The City Harmonic
- Rap/Hip Hop Song of the Year: "Beautiful Mess" – RationaL
- Seasonal Song of the Year: "It's Still Christmas" – Colin Bernard
- Southern Gospel Song of the Year: "Don't Forget About The Cross" – The Master's Four
- Pop/Contemporary Song of the Year: "He Is With Us" – Love & the Outcome
- Urban/R&B/Soul Song of the Year: "I Still Need You" – Fresh I.E. feat AJ
- International Song of the Year: "Whom Shall I Fear" – Chris Tomlin
- Children's Album of the Year: Live It Up – Q-Town
- Country/Bluegrass Album of the Year: Just As I Am – Paul Brandt
- Folk/Roots Album of the Year: Roots of Worship – Jon Bauer
- Francophone Album of the Year: L'Aube D'Un Jour Nouveau – Olivier Voyer
- Gospel/Caribbean Album of the Year: Takeover – Prosper & GPM
- Inspirational Album of the Year: Overwhelm Us – Brad Guldemond
- Instrumental Album of the Year: Melodic Twilight – Scott Pettipas
- Modern Worship Album of the Year: Trees – Tim Neufeld
- Pop/Contemporary Album of the Year: Unstoppable – Marika
- Praise Album of the Year: All the People Said Amen – Matt Maher
- Urban/R&B/Soul/Rap Album of the Year: Red Letterz13 – Fresh I.E.
- Special Events/Compilation of the Year: This Is Our Love – Jody Cross
- Jazz/Blues Album of the Year: Nuthin' But a Man – A.J.
- Rock/Modern Rock Album of the Year: Mrs. Sophomore – Junkyard Poets
- Seasonal Album of the Year: Songs of Christmas Volume 1 – Starfield
- Southern Gospel Album of the Year: New Perspective – The Torchmen Quartet
- CD/DVD Artwork of the Year: All Is Not Lost, Flood the Stone – Wayne Pashley
- Music Video of the Year: "This Life" – Dan Bremnes

== GMA Canada 2014 Covenant Award Winners / 36th Annual ==
- Lifetime Achievement Award: Brian Doerksen
- Album of the Year: Love & The Outcome – Love & the Outcome
- Artist of the Year: Dan Bremnes
- Male Vocalist of the Year: Dan Bremnes
- Female Vocalist of the Year: Amanda Lindsey Cook
- New Artist of the Year: The Royal Foundry
- Group of the Year: Love & the Outcome
- Producer of the Year: Jared Salte
- Song of the Year: "You Make Me Brave" – Amanda Lindsey Cook
- Recorded Song of the Year: "Beautiful" – Dan Bremnes
- Collaboration of the Year: "This is Love" – Ali Matthews & Joel Augé
- Aboriginal Song of the Year: "Stay Strong" – Yvonne St. Germaine
- Children's Album of the Year: Right Here Right Now – Q-Town
- Children's Song of the Year: "Good Life" – Russ Smith & Rick Colhoun
- Country/Southern Gospel Album of the Year: Hymns: Lest We Forget – The Torchmen Quartet
- Country/Bluegrass Song of the Year: "What I've Learned So Far" – Brad Rempel (High Valley) & Victoria Banks
- Folk Album of the Year: Tell Me a Story – Ali Matthews
- Folk/Roots Song of the Year: "Love" – The Royal Foundry
- Francophone Album of the Year: Heritage Cantiques & Hymnes Vol. 3 – Sebastian Demrey & Jimmy Lahaie
- Francophone Song of the Year: "Par Un Sourire" – Evaymé
- Gospel Album of the Year: Made For Worship – Toronto Mass Choir
- Gospel Song of the Year: "Made for Worship" – Jenna Burke
- Inspirational Album of the Year: Songs for the Journey Volume One – The SHIYR Poets
- Inspirational Song of the Year: "Faithful" – Greg Sykes & Joel Augé
- Instrumental Song of the Year: "Heaven's Joy" – Debbie Fortnum
- International Album of the Year: The Art of Celebration – Rend Collective
- International Song of the Year: "My Lighthouse" – Rend Collective
- Jazz/Blues Song of the Year: "Give Me One Good Reason" – Andrew Jaehn & Rudy Fast
- Pop/Contemporary Song of the Year: "Beautiful" – Dan Bremnes
- Praise And Worship Album of the Year: Kingdom Come – Bryan & Katie Torwalt
- Praise And Worship Song of the Year: "You Make Me Brave" – Amanda Lindsey Cook
- Rap Album of the Year: The Watchmen – KMF feat Young Scribe, Psalms & Fresh I.E.
- Rap Song of the Year: "The City is Fallen" – KMF feat Young Scribe, Psalms & Fresh I.E.
- Rock Album of the Year: We Are One – Sky Terminal
- Rock Song of the Year: "Diamonds" – Manafest & Trevor McNevan
- Seasonal Album of the Year: Christmas with You – Tenore
- Seasonal Song of the Year: "Emmanuel" – Love & the Outcome
- Southern Gospel Song of the Year: – "Your Love" – Canada's Double Portion
- Urban Song of the Year: "More Than Beautiful" – Rachelle Luk. Rachelle Luk and Mike Klose songwriters
- Video of the Year: – "Dieu Tout Puissant" – Sebastian Demrey & Jimmy Lahaie
- CD/DVD Artwork of the Year: – Search The Heavens – Fraser Campbell (Design by Fraser Campbell, Liz Snell, Justine McHale and Ian McHale)

== GMA Canada 2015 Covenant Award Winners / 37th Annual ==
- Lifetime Achievement Award: Roy Salmond
- Album of the Year: Saints And Sinners Matt Maher
- Artist of the Year: Fresh I.E.
- Female Vocalist of the Year: Chelsea Amber
- Male Vocalist of the Year: Drew Brown
- Group of the Year: The City Harmonic
- New Artist of the Year: The Informants
- Producer of the Year: Andrew Horrocks
- Album Artwork of the Year: Pilgrimage – Steve Bell – Design by Roberta Hansen
- Video of the Year: Diamond in the Rough (Acoustic) – Chelsea Amber
- Song of the Year: "Come Alive" – Jon Neufeld. Jon Neufeld and Allen Salmon songwriters
- Recorded Song of the Year: "I'm Free" – Tim Neufeld & The Glory Boys
- Collaboration of the Year: Collide (City of Worship 2) – Fresh I.E. with Paul Brandt, The Color, Cynthia Hamar, The City Harmonic, Fraser Campbell, Tasman Jude, Scribe, Cote, One8Tea, Tuzil, Jon Loeppky and Matt Gilman
- Children's Album of the Year: Let It Out! – Brad Guldemond
- Country Album of the Year: Sweetest Sound – The Amundruds
- Folk Album of the Year: Pilgrimage – Steve Bell
- Francophone Album of the Year: Heritage Cantiques de Noel – Sebastian Demrey & Jimmy Lahaie
- Gospel Album of the Year: Get Up – Jireh Gospel Choir
- Inspirational Album of the Year: Arise O Sleeper – The Wiebes
- Instrumental Album of the Year: New World – Trevor Dick Band
- Jazz/Blues Album of the Year: All The Way Live – Newworldson
- Pop Album of the Year: Introducing Chelsea Amber, Chelsea Amber
- Praise & Worship Album of the Year: Living Waters – Marcel & Ruth Preston
- Rap Album of the Year: Real Life – Malachi
- Rock Album of the Year: VIP – Manic Drive
- Seasonal Album of the Year: 40cm of Funk – Josh Lake
- Southern Gospel Album of the Year: Run Through The Gates – The Torchmen Quartet
- Aboriginal Song of the Year: "Rise Again" – Treneta Bowden. Treneta Bowden and Sean Spicer songwriters
- Children's Song of the Year: "Every Kid in the House Tonight" – Rick Colhoun & Russ Smith
- Country Song of the Year: "Under Stars" – Coalmont
- Folk Song of the Year: "Count Me In" – Rob Berg
- Francophone Song of the Year: "Libère-moi de moi-même", Luc Dumont
- Gospel Song of the Year: "But Your Praise" – Derin Bello. Derin Bello and Andrew Horrocks songwriters
- Inspirational Song of the Year: "I Am Not" – Rachelle Luk. Rachelle Luk and Mike Klose songwriters
- Instrumental Song of the Year: "You Are Holy" – Ron Fischer
- Jazz/Blues Song of the Year: "Awaken My Love" – Sean Spicer
- Pop Song of the Year: "One Sure Thing" – The Color. Tony Wood, Rusty Varenkamp, James Shiels and Jordan Janzen songwriters
- Praise and Worship Song of the Year: "Waiting on You" – Glenn Vincent Breen and Michael Rossback songwriters
- Rap Song of the Year: "Broken Veil" – Fresh I.E. Robert Wilson, Elias Dummer, Eric Fusilier, Aaron Powell and Josh Vanderlaan songwriters
- Rock Song of the Year: "Run" – West of Here
- Seasonal Song of the Year: "What Kind of King" – Carolyn Arends
- Urban Song of the Year: "Diamond in the Rough" – Chelsea Amber. Chelsea Amber and Paul Colman songwriters.

== GMA Canada 2017 Covenant Award Winners / 38th Annual ==
- Lifetime Achievement Award: Martin Smith
- Album of The Year: Exhale – Thousand Foot Krutch
- Artist of the Year: Tim Neufeld
- Group of The Year: Tim Neufeld and the Glory Boys
- Female Vocalist of The Year: Charmaine Brown
- Male Vocalist of The Year: Matt Maher
- New Artist of The Year: Mat & Nicole Crisp
- Producer of The Year: Drew Brown
- Recorded Song of The Year: "What I Would Say To You" – The Color
- Song of The Year: "You Are With Me" – Andrew Marcus. Andrew Marcus, Paul Baloche and Scott Cash songwriters
- Collaboration of The Year: "Story" – Ali Matthews feat Tim Neufeld
- Video of The Year: "What I Would Say To You" – The Color
- CD/DVD Artwork Design: A New Direction – Jon Corbin. Design by Jermaine Wall
- Children's Album of The Year: Happy Beach – Perry Springman
- Children's Song of The Year: "As For Me and My House" – Dan Macaulay
- Folk Album of The Year: Bows & Arrows – Cindy Morgan
- Folk Song of The Year: "In the Stillness" – Ali Matthews
- Gospel Album of The Year: No One Else – Ayo Oni
- Gospel Song of The Year: "Joy!" – Warren Dean Flandez feat. Top Line Vocal Collective. Warren Dean Flandez, Karolyn Volbek and Jamie Kuse songwriters
- Inspirational Album of The Year: Songs for the Journey Volume Two – The SHIYR Poets
- Inspirational Song of The Year: "Where the Sidewalk Ends" – Jon Bauer. Jon Bauer and Rusty Varenkamp songwriters
- Instrumental Album of The Year: Unchanging Grace – Steve Wingfield
- Instrumental Song of The Year: "Rise Again" – Sean Spicer & Treneta Bowden
- Praise & Worship Album of The Year: Champion – Bryan & Katie Torwalt
- Praise & Worship Song of The Year: "Glory to His Name" – Andrew Marcus
- Rap Album of The Year: Reverence – One8Tea
- Rap Song of The Year: "10,000 Angels" – Ezekiel Feat. Fresh I.E. Ezekiel McMurtry and Robert Wilson songwriters
- Seasonal Album of The Year: Christmas Time – The Quintons
- Seasonal Song of The Year: "Emmanuel" - Ali Matthews
- Southern Gospel/Country Album of The Year: Emmanuel God With Us – The Torchmen Quartet
- Country Song of The Year: "What's Life All About" - Andy Taylor
- Jazz/Blues Song of The Year: "Long Lonely Road" – Andy Taylor
- Pop Song of The Year: "What I Would Say To You" – The Color. Jordan Janzen, James Shiels, Rusty Varenkamp, Aaron Rice songwriters
- Rock Song of The Year: "Alive in Us" – Mark Steinbrenner
- Urban Song of The Year: "Never Dim My Light" - Warren Dean Flandez feat Terrance Richmond.
- The World Vision Artist Collective Humanitarian Award: David Ruis

== GMA Canada 2018 Covenant Award Winners / 39th Annual ==
- Lifetime Achievement Award: Industry – Dave Zeglinski
- Lifetime Achievement Award: Artist – Steve Bell
- Album of The Year: Where the Good Way Lies – Steve Bell
- Artist of the Year: The Color
- CD/DVD Artwork Design: Orbits – Keith Kitchen, Brent & Caroline Flink, Flink Creative
- Collaboration of The Year: Where the Good Way Lies – Steve Bell, Fresh I.E., Ray "Coco" Stevenson
- Country Song of the Year: "Rest in Me" – Jaylene Johnson
- Female Vocalist of The Year: Brooke Nicholls
- Folk Album of The Year: Orbits – Keith Kitchen
- Folk Song of The Year: "Joy (Oh There She Goes)" – Fraser Campbell
- Francophone Album of the Year: Rendez-Vous – Emilie Charette
- Francophone Song of the Year: "Tant Que Je Respirerai" – Timothé Beaulieu
- Gospel Album of The Year: Eternally Grateful – Warren Dean Flandez
- Gospel Song of The Year: "Pray – Pray Again" – Jaylene Johnson
- Group of The Year: The Color
- Inspirational Album of The Year: Reverse – Greg Sykes
- Inspirational Song of The Year: "Wait Alone in Stillness" – Steve Bell
- Instrumental Album of The Year: Hymns for the Seasons – Steve Wingfield
- Instrumental Song of The Year: "The Newborn King" – Drew Brown
- International Album of the Year: Let There Be Light – Hillsong Worship
- International Song of the Year: "Even If" – MercyMe. Bart Millard, Ben Glover, Crystal Lewis, David Garcia, Tim Timmons songwriters
- Jazz/Blues Album of the Year: The Dark Threads – Suzanne Vaartstra
- Jazz/Blues Song of the Year: "Jubilation" – Johnny Summers
- Male Vocalist of The Year: Greg Sykes
- New Artist of The Year: Brooke Nicholls
- Pop Album of the Year: Eternally Grateful – Warren Dean Flandez
- Pop Song of the Year: "First Day of My Life" – The Color. James Shiels, Jordan Janzen and Bryan Fowler songwriters
- Praise & Worship Album of The Year: Benediction (Live) – The City Harmonic
- Praise & Worship Song of The Year: "Honestly" – Elias Dummer. Elias Dummer, Anadara Arnold and Carl Cartee songwriters
- Producer of The Year: Drew Brown
- Recorded Song of The Year: "Surprise" – The Color
- Rock Album of the Year: Uprising – The Informants
- Rock Song of the Year: "House of Cards" – Manafest
- Seasonal Album of The Year: O Night Divine – Drew Brown
- Seasonal Song of The Year: "Hallelujah For the Cross" – Drew Brown
- Song of The Year: "Overhead Projector" – Tim Neufeld and Ryan McAllister
- Southern Gospel/Country Album of The Year: Plum Coulee, My Home – Rosemary Siemens & The Sweet Sound Revival
- Urban/Rap Album of The Year: Eternally Grateful – Warren Dean Flandez
- Urban/Rap Song of The Year: "Pressure" – Landry
- Video of The Year: "Reverse" – Greg Sykes

== GMA Canada 2019 Covenant Award Winners / 40th Annual ==
- Album of the Year: First Day of My Life – The Color
- Artist of the Year: The Color
- Album Artwork Design of The Year: Grateful – Brian Doerksen. Design by Roberta Landreth
- Collaboration of The Year: "My Soul Is Spoken For" – Infinitely More feat Drew Brown)
- Female Vocalist of The Year: Brooke Nicholls
- Group of The Year: The Color
- Male Vocalist of The Year: Jordan St. Cyr
- New Artist of The Year: Jordan St. Cyr
- Producer of The Year: Roy Salmond
- Radio Single of The Year: "Let It Be Love" – The Color
- Recorded Song of The Year: "In My Lifetime" – Jordan St. Cyr
- Song of The Year: "In My Lifetime" – Jordan St. Cyr. Jordan St. Cyr and Ben Calhoun songwriters
- Video of The Year: "Let It Be Love" – The Color
- GMA Canada Legacy Award: Vineyard Music Canada
- Children's Album of The Year: Break Free – Q-Town
- Country / Southern Gospel Album of The Year: There Is More – Canada's Double Portion
- Folk Album of The Year: The Beauty of the One – Infinitely More
- Francophone Album of The Year: Amour – Mylen Quéry
- Gospel Album of The Year: Speak – Warren Dean Flandez
- Inspirational Album of The Year: Grateful – Brian Doerksen
- Instrumental Album of The Year: Amazing Grace – Songs of Inspiration – Steve Wingfield
- Pop/Rock Album of The Year: First Day of My Life – The Color
- Praise & Worship Album of The Year: What Is A Mountain – C4 Worship
- Urban/Rap Album of The Year: Speak – Warren Dean Flandez
- Seasonal Album of The Year: Beauty Bright – Drew Brown
- Children's Song of The Year: "Even More" – Brad Guldemond & Greg Sykes
- Country Song of The Year: "Heavenly Harvest" – Rosemary Siemens and the Sweet Sound Revival. Rosemary Siemens, Billy Sprague and Joe Beck songwriters
- Folk Song of The Year: "Scars on His Hands" – Brian Doerksen
- Francophone Song of The Year: "À La Croix" – Sandie M
- Gospel Song of The Year: "If Jesus Is The Face of God" – Brian Doerksen & Jaylene Johnson
- Inspirational Song of The Year: "I Will Sing" – Mat Crisp. Mat Crisp, Joanna Lafleur, Steve Lensink, Brooke Nicholls and Chris Vacher songwriters
- Instrumental Song of The Year: "Shadows & Light" – Drew Brown
- Jazz/Blues Song of The Year: "My God, He Said" – Johnny Summers
- Pop Song of The Year: "In My Lifetime" – Jordan St. Cyr. Jordan St. Cyr and Ben Calhoun songwriters
- Praise & Worship Song of The Year: "No Greater Love (How Marvelous)" – Greg Sykes & Darren Mulligan
- Rap Song of The Year: "Good Friday" – Drew Brown. Drew Brown and Cyril Guerette songwriters
- Rock Song of The Year: "The Other Side" – Matt Adams
- Seasonal Song of The Year: "A Merry Christmas To You" – Derin Bello & Andrew Horrocks
- Southern Gospel Song of The Year: "Hands" – Christina Hemmerling, Debbie Hemmerling, Duncan A Hemmerling
- Urban Song of The Year: "Face The Waves" – Chelsea Amber. Chelsea Amber and Nate Savage songwriters.r

== GMA Canada 2020 Covenant Award Winners / 41st Annual ==
- Album of the Year: Wherever I Go – Dan Bremnes
- Artist of the Year: The Color
- Female Vocalist of the Year: Brooke Nicholls
- Male Vocalist of the Year: Dan Bremnes
- Group of the Year: The Color
- Breakthrough Artist of the Year: Elias Dummer
- Producer of the Year: Steve Lensink
- Song of the Year: "Wherever I Go" – Dan Bremnes. Dan Bremnes and Bryan Fowler songwriters
- Radio Single of the Year: "Wherever I Go" – Dan Bremnes
- Recorded Song of the Year: "Wherever I Go" – Dan Bremnes
- Collaboration of the Year: The Kind of Man Remix – Neon Feather
- Album Artwork Design of the Year: Resurrection Sound – C4 Worship. Emily Banks, Joanna la Fleur and Landon Wideman designers
- Video of the Year: "Wherever I Go" – Dan Bremnes
- Country/Southern Gospel Album of the Year: Open Book – The Daze's
- Folk Album of the Year: Slow Down – Kyle Church
- Gospel Album of the Year: It's Not Over Live – Powerhouse Fellowship Soul Choir featuring Shawn Cotterell
- Indigenous Album of the Year: Tired of Basic – LoveCollide (released 2018)
- Instrumental Album of the Year: Christmas Presence – Steve Wingfield (released 2018)
- Pop/Rock Album of the Year: Face the Waves – Chelsea Amber (released 2018)
- Praise & Worship Album of the Year: Resurrection Sound – C4 Worship
- Rap / Urban Album of the Year: The Flight of the Hummingbird – Fresh I.E.
- Seasonal Album of the Year: X – Hymns for the Architect (released 2018)
- Children's Song of the Year: "You And Me" – Rosemary Siemens & Jaylene Johnson
- Country/Southern Gospel Song of the Year: "Trust You" – Lindsey Minaker (released 2018)
- Folk Song of the Year: "How Long" – Jaylene Johnson (released 2016)
- Gospel Song of the Year: "Brought Me Through" – Reynaldo Dames, Andrae Crouch (d.2015)
- Indigenous Song of the Year: "Undeniable" – (LoveCollide) (released 2018)
- Inspirational Song of the Year: "Pursue" – Brooke Nicholls
- Instrumental Song of the Year: "You Say" – Lauren Daigle, arrangement by Rosemary Siemens & Eli Bennett (released 2018)
- Jazz/Blues Song of the Year: "Love Letter" – Chelsea Amber & Meaghan Smith (released 2018)
- Pop Song of the Year: "The Kind of Man" – The Color – Jeff Pardo, James Shiels and Jordan Janzen songwriters
- Praise & Worship Song of the Year: "Turn My Eyes" – Brooke Nicholls
- Rap/Urban Song of the Year: "It's Not Over" – Fresh I.E. feat Illa (d. 2016) | Robert "Fresh I.E." Wilson, Matthew Jarvis
- Rock Song of the Year: "Us and Them" – Amy Savin & Josh Porter
- Seasonal Song of the Year: "It's Christmas Time" – Brant Pethick, Jaylene Johnson (released 2018)
- GMA Canada Song Hall of Fame: "Seize The Day" – Carolyn Arends (released April 18, 2000)
- GMA Canada Song Hall of Fame: "You Are My Wholeness" – Roy Salmond & Mike Mulder (released 1981)

== See also ==
- Music of Canada
- List of religion-related awards
