= Carolyn Arends =

- Born: Carolyn Bernice Jonat; February 26, 1968 (age 57); Vancouver, British Columbia, Canada
- Genres: Contemporary Christian
- Occupations: Singer; songwriter; producer; author
- Instrument: Guitar
- Years active: 1995–present
- Labels: Reunion Records; 2B Records; Signpost Music
- Website: carolynarends.com

Carolyn Arends is a Canadian contemporary Christian musician, songwriter, and author based in Surrey, British Columbia, Canada.

== Musical career ==
Arends began her career as a songwriter at Benson Music Publishing. In 1995, she began touring and releasing albums as a singer and guitarist. Her debut release that year (I Can Hear You) was released through Reunion Records. I Can Hear You reached No. 37 on Billboard's Contemporary Christian Chart in 1996. Feel Free was No. 10 on the chart in 1997. Since 2001 her albums have mostly been distributed by Signpost Music. She is the winner of two Gospel Music Association Dove Awards and six GMA Canada Covenant Awards. Arends co-hosted the 29th Annual Covenant Awards in 2007 (with Leland Klassen) and the 31st Annual Covenant Awards in 2009 (with Arlen Salte).

== Discography ==
=== Albums ===
I Can Hear You (review)

- Released: August 15, 1995
- Format: CD
- Label: Reunion Records
- Producer: Brown Bannister
- Chart position: No. 37 US Top Contemporary Christian Albums
- Tracks: "This Is The Stuff", "I Can Hear You", "Seize The Day", "Altar of Ego", "Love Is Always There", "Reaching", "The Power of Love", "You Take My Soul By Storm", "What I Wouldn't Give", "Home Fires Burning", "All Is Well"

Feel Free (review)

- Released: March 11, 1997
- Format: CD
- Label: Reunion Records
- Producer: Brown Bannister
- Chart position: No. 10 US Top Contemporary Christian Albums
- Tracks: "Do What You Do", "New Year's Day", "Feel Free", "There You Are", "This I Know", "Big Deal", "Last Thursday (Call Me Crazy)", "Do We Dare", "Good Thing Going", "Father, Thy Will Be Done"

This Much I Understand (review)

- Released: March 22, 1999
- Format: CD
- Label: Reunion Records
- Producer: Dan Marnien and Carolyn Arends
- Tracks: "Happy", "Life Is Long", "Go With God", "Life And Death", "The Day Will Never Come", "Surprised By Joy", "One-Syllable Words", "Even The Wallflowers", "In Between", "Love You Out Loud", "In Good Hands", "We've Been Waiting For You"

Seize the Day and Other Stories (review)

- Released: April 18, 2000
- Format: CD
- Label: Reunion Records
- Producer: Brown Bannister, Dan Marnien, Carolyn Arends, Brad Crisler, Russ Long
- Tracks: "They'll Know We Are Christians", "What Love Looks Like", "Seize the Day", "New Year's Day", "The Power of Love", "Reaching", "Do What You Do", "This Is The Stuff", "Happy", "Father Thy Will Be Done", "We've Been Waiting For You", "Seize the Day" (live) (duet with Mac Powell), "This I Know" (live), "There You Are" (live), "I Can Hear You" (live), "Go With God" (live)

Travelers (review)

- Released: October 15, 2001
- Format: CD
- Label: Signpost Music
- Producer: Carolyn Arends
- Tracks: "Eternity in Our Hearts", "Travelers (The Airport Song)", "Dance Like No One's Watching", "What We Hope For", "It's Out of My Hands", "Only Love", "River of Love", "Loving You", "I Believe", "It Has To Be You", "(I Wanna) Go Somewhere With You", "Do Not Be Afraid"

We've Been Waiting For You (review)

- Released: April 4, 2002
- Format: CD
- Label: 2B Records / Signpost
- Producer: Carolyn Arends
- Tracks: "Moving", "Come Anyway", "The Thought of You", "Don't Forget Where You Came From", "Your Father in Heaven", "We've Been Waiting For You", "(You Make Me Feel) Like A Natural Woman", "Even The Wallflowers", "Be God's", "Forever Young"

Under the Gaze (review)

- Released: October 4, 2004
- Format: CD
- Label: 2B Records / Signpost
- Producer: Carolyn Arends
- Tracks: "This Is The Moment", "Great Cloud of Witnesses", "Not A Tame Lion", "Any Given Sunday", "Getting Ready For Glory", "Under The Gaze", "Your Laugh", "Half A Million Reasons", "Fragile", "Who You Are", "Only Time Will Tell", "May You Live"

Christmas: An Irrational Season (review)

- Released: November 2, 2004
- Format: CD
- Label: 2B Records / Signpost
- Producer: Carolyn Arends
- Tracks: "The Irrational Season (Prelude)", "Come And See", "Do Not Be Afraid", "Angels We Have Heard on High", "Christmas Must Be Tonight", "Is Bethlehem Too Far Away", "Now in Flesh Appearing", "My First Christmas", "Go Tell It on the Mountain", "The Lord's Servant", "Come Thou Long-Expected Jesus", "A Christmas Blessing", "The Irrational Season (Postlude)"

Simply Carolyn Arends

- Released: June 2005
- Format: CD
- Label: Provident Label Group
- Tracks: "Power of Love", "Go With God", "Seize That Day", "I Can Hear You", "Feel Free", "Reaching", "In Good Hands", "Surprised By Joy"

Pollyanna's Attic (reviews)

- Released: May 16, 2006
- Format: CD
- Label: 2B Records / Signpost
- Producer: Carolyn Arends
- Tracks: "Just Pretending", "Something to Give", "What in the World", "The Wasteland", "Land of the Living", "To See Your Face", "Everybody Wants Everything", "More is Less", "Free", "No Trespassing", "Not Alone", "I've Got a Hope"

Love Was Here First (review)

- Released: 2009
- Format: CD
- Label: 2B Records / Signpost
- Writer: Carolyn Arends
- Producer: Roy Salmond, Carolyn Arends
- Tracks: "Be Still", "Standing in the Need of Prayer", "My Favourite Lie", "Something out of Us", "I am a Soul", "Willing", "Roll it", "The Last Word", "According to Plan", "Nothing Can Separate", Never Say Goodbye"

=== Singles ===
Year	Single	Chart Positions		Album
Year	Single	CAN AC	CAN	Album
1996	"This Is the Stuff"	3	23	I Can Hear You
1996	"I Can Hear You"	7	18	I Can Hear You
1997	"Seize the Day"	29		I Can Hear You
1997	"Do What You Do"	20	59	Feel Free

=== Books ===
- Feel Free (1997)
- Living the Questions: Making Sense of the Mess and Mystery of Life (Harvest House, 2000)
- Ragamuffin Prayers (2000, by Jimmy Abegg, contributions by Carolyn Arends and others)
- We've Been Waiting for You (2002)
- Wrestling With Angels: Adventures in Faith and Doubt (Harvest House, 2008)

=== Collaborations ===
- co-wrote lyrics for "Diamonds from the Other Side" with Steve Bell on his album: Waiting for Aidan (Signpost, 2001)
- co-wrote lyrics for "Not So Hip" with Bec Abbot on her album: Not So Hip (Signpost, 2005)

=== Notable appearances ===
- Parachute Music Festival (January 1997)
- Cornerstone Festival (July 1997)
- Kingdom Bound (August 1997)
- Cornerstone Festival (July 2002)
- Harmony vocals on "He Will Listen To You", "Rest", and "The Peace of Christ" on Glen Soderholm's album Rest (Signpost, 2003)
- Duet on "One Heart" on Greg Magirescu's album Sweet Surrender (Angel Cake Café, 2003)
- Harmony vocals on "Approach My Soul The Mercy Seat" and "Come Ye Disconsolate" on Glen Soderholm's World Without End (Signpost, 2006)
- Vocals on Jacob Moon's "Winter Song", "It Came Upon The Midnight Clear" and "O Come, O Come, Emmanuel", This Christmas (Signpost, 2007)

=== Songs in other projects ===
- Vancouver Seeds VI, "No Trespassing" (1991) (Note: Vancouver Seeds is an annual talent contest run by the Vancouver, British Columbia FM radio station CFOX-FM.)
- Music You Can Believe In, "Seize the Day" (Reunion Records, 1995)
- Noel, "What Child Is This", with Brent Bourgeois and Derri Daugherty (Via, 1995)
- Noel, "Angels We Have Heard on High", with Jenny Gullen and Stephen Murray (Via, 1995)
- Orphans of God: A Tribute to Mark Heard, "Love Is So Blind" (Fingerprint Records, 1996)
- Within the Sound of Your Voice by Amy Morriss, "Has to Be You" (Myrrh Records, 1997)
- Songs 4 Life: Renew Your Heart, "Seize the Day" (Madacy, 1998)
- Keep the Faith 2000, "Love Is Always There" (Chordant Records, 1998)
- Awesome God: A Tribute to Rich Mullins, "Jacob and Two Women" (Reunion, November 10, 1998)
- Prince of Peace, "Seize the Day" (Brentwood Music, 1999)
- Sing Me to Sleep, Mommy, "You Bring Me Joy" (Brentwood, April 27, 1999)
- Yes I Believe in God, "Happy" (Reunion, 1999)
- Songs for the Soul: Grace, "Seize the Day" (Madacy, 2000)
- Songs for the Soul: Joy, "Happy" (Madacy, 2000)
- Rock on Christian, "This I Know" (Madacy, 2001)
- Rock on Worship, "Father Thy Will Be Done" (Madacy, 2002)
- Signpost Collections, Vol. 1, "Dance Like No One's Watching" and "We've Been Waiting For You" (Signpost Music, 2003)
- Sons & Daughters by Steve Bell and Sarah Bell, "Getting Ready For Glory" (Signpost, 2004)
- 28th Annual Covenant Hits, "Something To Give" (CMC, 2007)
- Sea to Sea: The Voice of Creation, "Land of the Living" (CMC, 2007)
- GMA Canada presents 30th Anniversary Collection, "Seize the Day" (CMC, 2008)
- Sea to Sea: Christmas, "Angels We Have Heard on High" (Lakeside, 2009)
- Bellsburg... The Songs of Rich Mullins, "Whitewater" (Old Bear Records, 2022)

== Awards and recognition ==
GMA Canada Covenant Awards

- 2002 Pop/Contemporary Song of the Year, "Dance Like No One's Watching"
- 2003 Inspirational Album of the Year, We've Been Waiting for You
- 2005 Inspirational Song of the Year, "Getting Ready For Glory", from Under the Gaze
- 2005 Seasonal Album of the Year, Christmas: An Irrational Season
- 2006 Pop/Contemporary Song of the Year, "Not So Hip" (co-written with Bec Abbot)
- 2007 Folk/Roots Song of the Year, "Everybody Wants Everything" (co-written with her brother Chris Jonat)
- 2009 nominee, Female Vocalist of the Year
- 2010 Folk-Roots Song of the Year: "Be Still" (Note: For the 2010 Covenant Awards of October 29, 2010 Arends also received nominations for Female Vocalist of the Year, Folk/Roots Album of the Year: Love Was Here First, Inspirational Song of the Year: "Never Say Goodbye", and Jazz/Blues Song of the Year: "Roll It".)
- 2010 CD/DVD Artwork Design of the Year: Love Was Here First

GMA Dove Awards

- 1995 Country Recorded Song of the Year: "Love Will" (co-written with Connie Harrington and Michael James) (Note: She was the first Canadian to win this honour from the US-based Gospel Music Association.)
- 1996 nominee, New Artist of the Year
- 1997 International Artist of the Year

Juno Awards

- 1998 nominee, Best Gospel Album, Feel Free
- 2002 nominee, Best Gospel Album, Travelers
- 2007 nominee, Contemporary Christian/Gospel Album of the Year, Pollyanna's Attic

Shai Awards (formerly The Vibe Awards)

- 2003 Female Vocalist of the Year
- 2003 Inspirational Album of the Year: We've Been Waiting For You
- 2005 Female Soloist Artist of the Year
- 2005 Folk Album of the Year, Under the Gaze
- 2005 Inspirational Album of the Year, Under the Gaze
- 2005 Seasonal Album of the Year, Christmas: An Irrational Season
- 2007 Folk Album of the Year, Pollyanna's Attic

Western Canadian Music Awards

- 2010 nominee, Contemporary Christian/Gospel Recording of the Year: Love Was Here First

== See also ==
- Music of Canada
- List of Canadian musicians
