= Dana Marie =

- Origin: Kitchener, Ontario, Canada
- Genres: Christian, gospel
- Years active: 2010–present
- Website: danamariemusic.com

Dana Marie is a Christian recording artist from Kitchener, Ontario, Canada. Marie released her first album in 2010.

== Early life ==
Dana Marie was involved in various choirs, solos, and school musicals throughout high school. After graduating from Woodland Christian High School, she moved to Sydney, Australia where she attended the Hillsong International Leadership College. She moved back to Canada after receiving her Diploma of Ministry from Hillsong.

== Career ==
After releasing her first self-titled, full-length album in December 2010, Marie has performed and led worship at events such as the 100 Huntley Street, Kingdom Bound, and the Grand Valley Institution for Women.

Marie has two singles dedicated to Compassion Canada, "More Loved" and "One Act", and is currently working with Compassion Canada on her second album. She has also recorded Girl Power to Cure for Rett syndrome.

Other musicians performing with Marie include her brother Fraiser Hoekstra (drummer), and Nick Bronsema (acoustic guitarist) who both joined her in 2010. Kenny Butcher (bassist) and David Faris (electric guitarist) joined the band in 2011 and 2012 respectively.

== Awards ==
Marie won the 2010 Shining Star vocal competition for Christian radio station 94.3 Faith FM, judged in part by Jaci Velasquez. In 2011, Marie was nominated for "Modern Rock/Alternative Album of the Year" at the Gospel Music Association of Canada's Covenant Awards. In 2012, Marie won "Collaborative Song of the Year" for "Join Together" with Scott Towaij, Amy Savin, Ali Matthews, Sean Dayton, Chris Bray and Colin Bernard.

== Discography ==
=== Albums ===
- Dana Marie (2010)

=== Singles ===
- "You're Mine"(2010)
- "I'll Fly"
- "Love You More" (2011)
- "One Act" (2013)
