= Jon Buller =

- Born: December 27, 1970 (age 55)
- Origin: Winnipeg, Manitoba, Canada
- Genre: Contemporary Christian
- Years active: 1996 - present
- Labels: Hear The Music Productions, Signpost Music
- Website: www.jonbuller.com www.htmministries.com www.worshipartscanada.com

Jon Buller (born December 27, 1970) is a Contemporary Christian artist from Winnipeg, Manitoba, Canada. He now resides in Vernon, British Columbia. He was previously working as Pastor of Worship and the Arts for 12 years at Vernon Alliance Church, a position he began in August 2005. Buller founded and is the Executive Director for Hear the Music Ministries (HTM) in 1999; HTM is "committed to discipling and developing emerging Christian musicians, expressing worship through music."

Jon has released nine albums, an EP, and a concert video. In 2000, Jon Buller was nominated for a Juno Award for Best Gospel Album for his work, Sinner And The Saint. He received a 2006 Covenant Award for Praise & Worship Song of the Year, Lord of Every Thing.

== Discography ==
=== Albums ===
- Mystified (1993)
- That's What I'd Like (1996)
- Sinner and the Saint (1999, review)
- And Your Praise Goes On, Vol. 1 (1999)
- And Your Praise Goes On, Vol. 2 (2001)
- And Your Praise Goes On, Vol. 3 (2002, review)
- Broken Drum (2003, review) (Jon's cousins are featured)
- Best of Jon Buller Worship (2005, review)
- The Hymn Project - with Nolan Balzer and Kevin Aichele (Signpost, 2007)
- Light Up the Sky (Signpost, 2009)

=== Collaborations and other credits ===
- Vocals and acoustic guitar on Red Letterz by Fresh I.E. (2003)
- Singles - with Fresh I.E. (2008, EP)
- co-wrote "The Kingdom of Heaven" with Jacob Moon on Light Up The Sky (2009)
- co-wrote "Broken Beauty" with Bob Bennett on Light Up The Sky (2009)

=== Songs on compilations ===
- Sea to Sea: Filled With Your Glory, "Lord Of Everything" (CMC, 2004)

=== Video ===
- Hear The Music Live (2003, review)

== Awards and recognition ==
GMA Canada Covenant Awards

- 2005 Special Events/Compilation Album of the Year: Sea To Sea: Filled With Your Glory (Jon Buller et al.)
- 2006 Praise And Worship Song Of The Year: "Lord Of Every Thing"
- 2008 Classical/Traditional Album Of The Year: The Hymn Project (Buller, Balzer & Aichele)
- 2010 for the 2010 Covenant Awards to be announced October 29, 2010 Buller received a nomination for Modern Worship Album Of The Year: Light Up The Sky

Juno Awards

- 2000 nominee, Best Gospel Album: Sinner And The Saint

Western Canadian Music Awards

- 2003 nominee, Outstanding Christian Recording: Broken Drum
- 2008 nominee, Outstanding Contemporary Christian/Gospel Recording: The Hymn Project
- 2010 for the 2010 WCM Awards to be announced October 24, 2010 Buller received a nomination for Contemporary Christian/Gospel Recording of the Year: Light Up the Sky
