= Manic Drive =

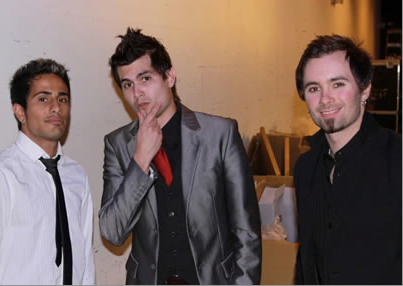

Background information
- Origin: Toronto, Ontario, Canada
- Genres: Rock; Christian rock; Metal; Power pop; Dance
- Years active: 2005–present
- Labels: Whiplash, Inpop/Capitol, Bema Media, SELECT Entertainment Group
- Members: Shawn Cavallo; Michael Cavallo; Doug Smith; Jean-Miguel Fils-Aime
- Past members: Anthony Moreino; Tyler Dolynsky; Phil Massicotte; Johnny DiMarco; Travis Blackmore; Dave Love; Keith Comer; Lucas Wright; David Brockenborough
- Website: manicdrive.com

Manic Drive is a Canadian Christian rock band, formed in 2004 by the brothers Michael and Shawn Cavallo. After receiving interest from a record label, they released Reason for Motion in May 2005. The band has released albums including Reset and Rewind (2007), Blue (2009), Epic (2011), VIP (2014), Into the Wild (2017), and Vol. 1 (2020).

== Band history ==
Manic Drive was formed in 2004 after disbanding the Christian family band One Cross with two members: Shawn Cavallo, former lead singer and drummer and his brother Michael Cavallo. The band went through several line-up changes early in its career, starting with the musician Lucas Wright. In April 2004, following a GMA showcase, Manic Drive signed to Butterfly Music Group (now Whiplash Records). The first album, Reason for Motion, was released in May 2005. Singles from the album ("Luckiest", "Nebulous", "Memories", and "Middle of it All") all entered the R&R Top 30 Christian Rock charts, reaching high in the top 10. In late 2005, the band toured with Seventh Day Slumber and Fireflight.

Manic Drive's follow-up album, released in 2007, was Reset & Rewind. After its release, Wright left the band and former members Phil Massicotte (bass guitar and backing vocals) and Johnny Dimarco (drums) were enlisted. In 2008, the band released the single "Blue", featuring Kevin Max of DC Talk, which reached number No. 28 on the Top 30 Christian Rock Billboard chart. "Blue" was featured as a world premiere by the Gospel Music Channel and was No. 2 only to Skillet's "Comatose" as the best Rock Video of 2009. The album was praised by critics, with CCM Magazine listing Reset & Rewind in the Critic Picks Top 10 Albums of 2007, along with Relient K and Anberlin.

In 2009, Massicotte and Dimarco left and the drummer Anthony Moreino joined, making a three-piece band. On August 18, 2009, Manic Drive re-released Reset & Rewind, renaming it Blue and adding several new songs including "Walls", "Music", and "Rain". CCM Magazine (January 2010 issue) listed Blue at No. 7 in its Top 10 picks of 2009. In late 2009, the band toured with the 1980s' metal band Stryper on its "25th Anniversary Tour".

In January 2010, Manic Drive released "Walls", which reached No. 7 on the Christian CHR Billboard Charts Top 30, No. 9 on Christian Music and No. 1 on AIR 1 Radio.

In 2011, Manic Drive worked with the producer Rob Wells and released Epic on September 27, 2011. The lead single, "Halo", was voted No. 1 on syndicated radio network Air 1's Mixology (a voting program on weeknights). In support of Epic, Manic Drive toured with the Newsboys across Canada on the "Maple Noise Tour" followed by "The Born Again Experience Tour" in the U.S. that fall.

In 2012, Good Times climbed to No. 12 on Top 30 CHR/HOT AC Billboard Chart, No. 1 on CRW and No. 1 in Canada on the CT-TOP 20.

In 2013, "Money" was No. 27 on the Top 30 CHR/Hot AC Billboard Chart and No. 2 on the Air 1 Radio Network. Following the media attention, Manic Drive was invited to team up with Audio Adrenaline on their spring "Kings and Queens Tour" which in turn, landed them a deal with Inpop/Capitol. Manic Drive finished the year touring across Canada on the Christmas "Wintour" with Building 429 and Hawk Nelson.

VIP was released on October 14, 2014. In February and March 2016, Manic Drive headlined the VIP Experience Tour with dates across the United States. "Easier" was released June 23, 2017, and "Mic Drop" was released July 17, 2017, as singles for an upcoming album.

Into the Wild was released on November 7, 2017. Manic Drive played part of the 2019 Winter Jam Tour, performing during the event's Pre-Jam Party.

Vol. 1 was released on November 20, 2020. Alongside the album release, Manic Drive held a "Virtual Concert" the same day since the COVID-19 pandemic prohibited them from going on tour.

Vol. 2 - EP was released on July 14, 2023.

== Discography ==
VIP was released on October 14, 2014, as an independent album. The first single from this album, "VIP", reached No. 1 on the Billboard Christian Rock Chart and No. 12 on the Christian CHR / Hot AC Chart.

Reason for Motion (review)

- Released: 2005
- Label: Whiplash Records

Reset and Rewind (reviews)

- Released: 2007
- Label: Whiplash Records

Blue

- Released: 2009
- Label: Whiplash Records / Bema Media

Epic

- Released: September 27, 2011

VIP

- Released: October 14, 2014

Into the Wild

- Released: November 7, 2017
- Label: SELECT Entertainment Group

Vol. 1

- Released: November 20, 2020
- Label: SELECT Entertainment Group

== Awards and recognition ==
Gospel Music Association of Canada Covenant Awards

- 2008: Winner - Rock Album of the Year: Reset & Rewind
- 2008: Winner - Video of the Year: "Eleven Regrets"
- 2012: Winner - Hard Rock/Alternative Album of the Year: Epic
- 2015: Winner - Rock Album of the Year: VIP

Gospel Music Channel Music Video Awards

- 2009: Nominee, Best Rock Video: "Blue"

Shai Awards (formerly The Vibe Awards)

- 2002: Nominee, Best Rock Alternative Album of the Year: Welcome to the Real World
- 2003: Nominee, Best Song of the Year

Juno Awards

- 2015: Winner, Best Christian Album VIP
- 2019: Nominee, Contemporary Christian/Gospel Album of the Year Into the Wild
