= Carried Away =

Carried Away may refer to:

== Film and television ==
- Carried Away (1996 film), a 1996 film
- Carried Away (2009 film), a 2009 film
- "Carried Away", an episode of Arthur
- "Carried Away", a 2019 episode of the television series Mickey Mouse

== Music ==
- Carried Away (band), a Canadian contemporary Christian band
- Carried Away (People Under the Stairs album), 2009
- Carried Away (Ooberman album), 2006
- "Carried Away" (George Strait song), 1996
- "Carried Away" (Olivia Newton-John song), 1981
- "Carried Away" (Passion Pit song), 2013
- "Carried Away", a song by Hayden from Skyscraper National Park
- "Carried Away", a song by Kylie Minogue from CD single Wow
- "Carried Away", a song by Sonicflood from Sonicflood
- "Carried Away", a song from the 1944 musical On the Town
- "Carried Away", a song by Carried Away from Closer to You
- "Carried Away", a song by H.E.R. from I Used to Know Her
- "Carried Away", a song by Surf Mesa and Madison Beer, 2021.
- "Carried Away", a song by Maisie Peters from Florescence

== Other ==
- When Ski Lifts Go Wrong, a 2017 construction simulator video game titled Carried Away while in early access
- "Carried Away", a storyline in the science fiction comedy webtoon series Live with Yourself!
