= The Royal Foundry =

Canadian band

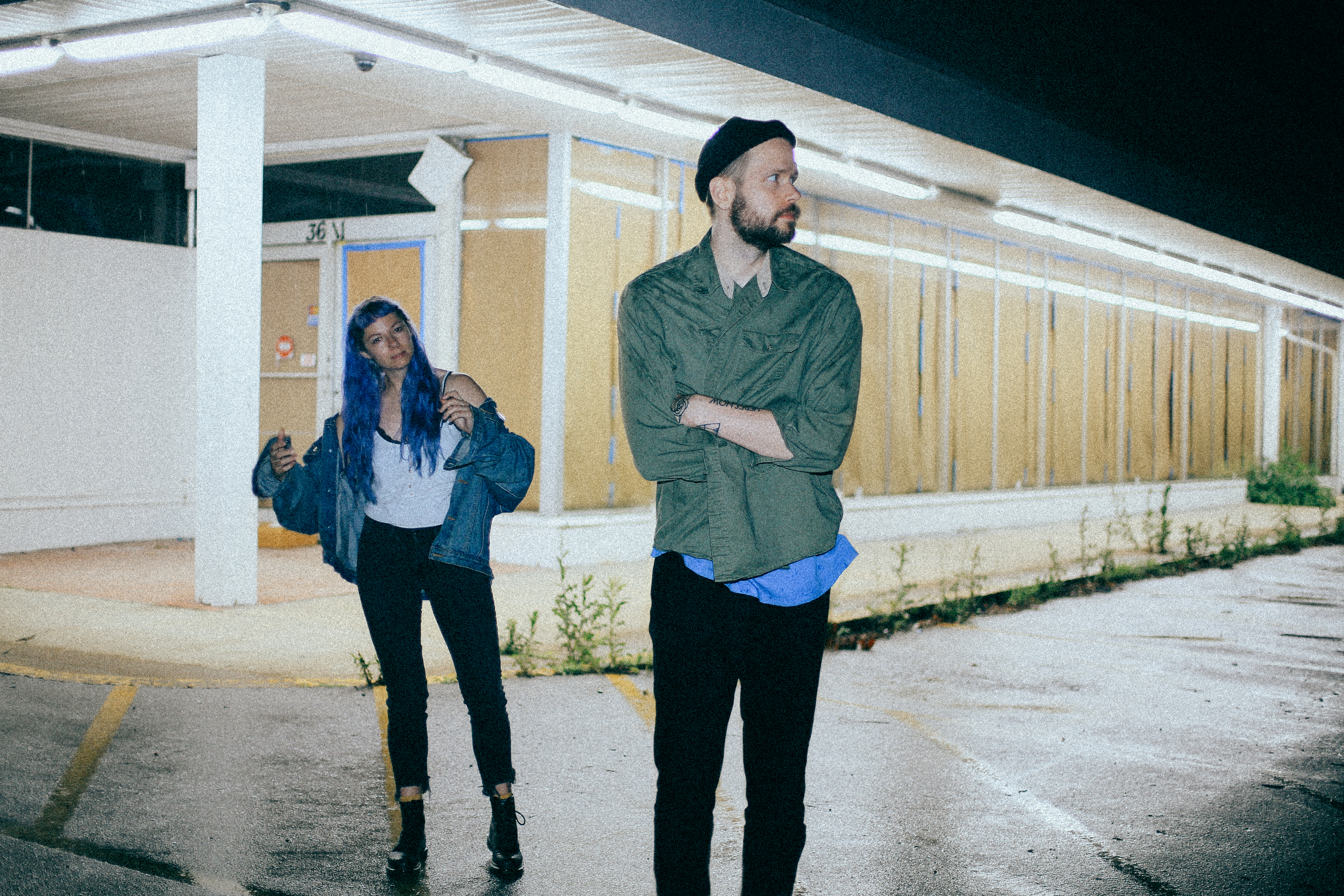
- The Royal Foundry - WAKEUP WAKEUP; The Royal Foundry

Background information
- Origin: Edmonton, Alberta, Canada
- Genres: Alternative rock, indie rock, alternative pop, synth pop.
- Years active: 2013–present
- Labels: Peermusic, MapleMusic Recordings
- Members: Bethany Schumacher; Jared Salte
- Website: theroyalfoundry.com

The Royal Foundry is a Canadian alternative pop quartet band whose core is the Edmonton couple Jared Salte and Bethany Schumacher. They initially formed as a folk duo but, in 2015, began a significant revitalization and revision of their sound, incorporating elements of 1990's Brit-Pop with power-pop stylings of groups like Arcade Fire, and 1970's Progressive Rock elements inspired by groups like Yes and Supertramp Their music has been described as alt rock, indie rock, alternative pop, and Synth Pop.

== Early life ==
Jared Salte was raised in a musical household and began playing piano and guitar at age five. By age 11, he was running the recording studio Salt Shaker Studios. By age 15, he had won his first international songwriting competition and released his first album. At 19, his band, the Junkyard Poets, opened for The Newsboys in stadiums across North America.

Bethany Schumacher grew up in the church as a Pastor's daughter, with her mother as the pianist and choir director. She often sang at church, and at fundraising and community events. In high school, Schumacher played the female lead in all of her high school musicals.

== 2013-2016: Formation and early work ==
In 2013, shortly after their wedding, The Royal Foundry was formed as a Folk band. In 2014, they independently released their first album, Wherever We Go.

In 2015 they won $75,000 as part of the Peak Performance Project for their song “Running Away” which peaked at #21 on Alt-Rock Stations in Canada. “Running Away” was featured on TSN as the opening song for the CFL, and in two commercials--for ENMAX and the Government of Alberta Climate Change Campaign).

In 2016 their single “Start This Fire” was featured in an ad campaign for Purina Dog Chow, which led to their signing with Peermusic. In the fall of 2016 they released their single “Dreamers”, which was first performed at a concert they played in Toronto during the World Cup of Hockey week. Soon after the release, Disney licensed the song for their 2017 line of wedding dresses. and the song hit #35 on the Alt Rock charts in Canada

== 2017-2018: Lost In Your Head ==
On August 15, 2017, The Royal Foundry released their second album, Lost in Your Head. By 2018, the album had achieved 1 million streams on Spotify. The video for the single "All We Have" went viral.

Lost In Your Head won the Canadian Songwriting Competition Grand Prize, the John Lennon Songwriting Contest Grand Prize, and garnered The Royal Foundry a Pop Artist of the Year nomination from the Western Canadian Music Awards, as well as three nominations from the Edmonton Music Awards In 2018, the song "Never Have Time" was used in an Explore Edmonton commercial; the song "Lost In Your Head" was used in the Catfish: The TV Show.

== 2019-present: Wake Up Wake Up ==
On September 27, 2019, The Royal Foundry released their third album, Wake Up Wake Up. By 2020, the album had achieved half a million streams on Spotify. The first single to be released "Hopefully" reached #27 on Alternative Rock Radio in Canada and the third single "okay?" reached #16 on Alternative Rock Radio in Canada. Prior to the release of Wake Up Wake Up, The Royal Foundry performed a live performance of the album in Calgary, AB for the Stampede City Sessions. The concert aired on Shaw TV in Canada and PBS in the USA.

== Discography ==
Albums

- Wherever We Go (2014), Independent
- Lost In Your Head (2017), Independent
- Wake Up Wake Up (2019), MapleMusic Recordings
- Little High Little Low (2023)
- Be Kind. (2024)

Singles

- “Running Away” - March 3, 2016 #23 on Alternative Rock Radio across Canada
- “Start This Fire” - April 1, 2016
- “Dreamers” - September 23, 2016 #32 on Alternative Rock Radio across Canada
- “Dreamers (Grey MTTR Remix)” - January 18, 2017
- “Dreamers (Tep No Remix)” - March 17, 2017
- “Never Have Time” - April 17, 2017 - #28 on Alternative Rock Radio across Canada
- “All We Have” - May 5, 2017
- “You Are My Sunshine” - February 14, 2018
- “Never Have Time (Thauner & Westvik Remix)” - March 16, 2018
- “Lost In Your Head” (Radio Edit) - April 6, 2018
- “All We Have (Teddy Rose Remix)” - August 7, 2018
- “Don’t Know” - September 14, 2018
- "Hopefully" - April 16, 2019 #27 on Alternative Rock Radio across Canada – #44 on Canada Rock Radio
- "Here We Go" - July 16, 2019
- "Wake Up Wake Up" - September 6, 2019
- "okay?" - May 8, 2020 #16 on Alternative Rock Radio across Canada

== Awards ==
- GMA Canada 36th Annual Covenant Awards: Folk/Roots Song of the Year, "Folk Song" (2014)
- GMA Canada 36th Annual Covenant Awards: New Artist of the Year (2014)
- Peak Performance Project Alberta, Finalist (2014)
- CBC Searchlight Finalist (2014)
- CBC Searchlight Finalist (2015)
- Peak Performance Alberta, Second Prize (2015)
- Edmonton Music Awards: Single of the Year, "Running Away" (2016)
- Edmonton Music Awards: Group of the Year (2016)
- Edmonton Music Awards: Music Video of the Year, "Running Away" (2016)
- Edmonton Music Awards: Pop Recording of the Year, "All We Have" (2018)
- John Lennon Songwriting Contest: Grand Prize, Pop Category, "Never Have Time" (2018)
- Western Canadian Music Awards - Nominated as Pop Artist of the Year (2018)
- Unsigned Only: Grand Prize, Rock Category, "Lost In Your Head" (2018)
- Canadian Songwriting Competition: Grand Prize, “Running Away” (2019)
- Edmonton Music Awards: Indie Rock Recording of the Year, "Don't Know" (2019)
