= Londa =

Londa may refer to:

== People ==
- Maria Natalia Londa (born 1990), Indonesian athlete
- Londa Larmond (born 1975), Canadian musician
- Londa Schiebinger (born 1952), American historian
- Daniel Londa, French boxer

== Places ==
- Londa, Bangladesh, District in Bangladesh
- Londa, Karnataka, India
- Londa, Tuscany, Italy
- Londa Junction railway station Railway station in Belagavi district, Karnataka
