= Bec Abbot =

Canadian singer

- Born: 1971 (age 54–55); Kitchener, Ontario, Canada
- Genres: Pop, Christian
- Years active: 2002–2012

Bec Abbot is a Canadian singer who performed and recorded Contemporary Christian music. Her album Shine Like Stars was nominated for the 2004 Juno Award for "Contemporary Christian/Gospel Album of the Year".

== Life ==
As a girl, she sang publicly in front of her father's church. Local churches soon began calling her for Sunday mornings, banquets and special events. During High School, Abbot sang in choirs and for weddings.

She is married and has two children

== Career ==
In 1997, vocal coach Elaine Overholt saw Abbot singing and introduced her to Juno-nominated singer-songwriter Blaise Pascal. Abbot began singing back-up vocals for Pascal and opening for bands like Our Lady Peace and Tom Cochrane. However, it wasn't until Abbot moved outside Toronto that she began to write her own music.

== Recordings ==
In 2002, Bec recorded a three-song EP, which was noticed by Roy Salmond, who went on to produce Abbot's independent album Shine Like Stars in 2003, which received a Juno nomination. In late 2005, Abbot released her second album Not So Hip.

== Discography ==
Albums

- Shine Like Stars (2003, review)
- Not So Hip (2005, reviews)

Songs in other projects

- Signpost Collections Vol. 1, "Rest" (Signpost, 2003)
- Canadian Bible Society centennial CD: Good News Celebration, "We Will Shine" (CMC, 2006)

Collaborations

- co-wrote lyrics for the song "Not So Hip" with Carolyn Arends on Not So Hip (2005)

== Awards and recognition ==
GMA Canada Covenant Awards

- 2004 Pop/Contemporary Song of the Year: "Thrive"
- 2006 Pop/Contemporary Song of the Year: "Not So Hip" (co-written with Carolyn Arends)
- 2006 nominee, Pop/Contemporary Album of the Year: Not So Hip
- 2006 nominee, Female Vocalist Of The Year

Juno Awards

- 2004 nominee, Contemporary Christian/Gospel Album of the Year: Shine Like Stars
