= Parker Trio =

- Origin: Pickering, Ontario, Canada
- Genres: Southern Gospel
- Years active: 1995–2006
- Label: Song Garden Records
- Past members: Warren Parker (1971–2006); Shannan Parker; Angie White; Vanessa Young
- Website: www.parkertrio.com (defunct)

The Parker Trio was a Southern Gospel music group founded in 1995. The group originated from Pickering, Ontario, but was based in Nashville, Tennessee, and most of its performances were in the US. The group initially consisted of Warren Parker, his wife Shannan Parker, and Vanessa Young. In 2004, Young left the group and was replaced by Angie White, whose husband Brandt White was their tour bus driver and sound technician. On January 7, 2006, Warren Parker was struck by a truck and killed while touring with the trio in South Carolina. The group released five CDs, including a live concert DVD, recorded in Havana, Illinois. Their albums won several Gospel Music Association of Canada Covenant Awards and Shai Awards. While on tour, the group ministered in churches, and many different types of venues, including many prisons and drug rehabilitation centres; they were known to perform as many as 260 concerts a year.

== Discography ==
=== Albums ===
- A Chapter In Time
- With Wings As Eagles (as Warren & Shannan Parker), 2000, Song Garden Records
- Love Remains (2002), Song Garden Records
- Tearin' Down The Walls (2004)
- Live in Havana (2005), Independent

=== Video ===
- Live in Havana DVD

== Awards ==
=== GMA Canada Covenant Awards ===
- 1994 Favourite Instrumentalist Of The Year: Warren Parker
- 1998 Favourite Instrumentalist Of The Year: Warren Parker
- 1999 Favourite Instrumentalist Of The Year: Warren Parker
- 2000 Favourite Instrumentalist Of The Year: Warren Parker
- 2000 Favourite Vocal Group Of The Year: Parker Trio
- 2001 Favourite Vocal Group Artist Of The Year: Parker Trio
- 2001 Favourite Instrumentalist Artist Of The Year: Warren Parker
- 2001 Favourite Song Of The Year: "With Wings As Eagles" (Warren and Shannan Parker)
- 2001 nominee, Southern Gospel Album Of The Year: With Wings As Eagles
- 2001 nominee, Southern Gospel Song Of The Year: "With Wings As Eagles"
- 2001 nominee, Favourite Female Artist of the Year: Shannan Parker
- 2003 Southern Gospel Album Of The Year: Love Remains (Parker Trio)
- 2003 Southern Gospel Song Of The Year: "Thank God For Calvary"
- 2005 Southern Gospel Album Of The Year: Live in Havana (Parker Trio)
