= Fresh I.E. =

- Also known as: Freshie, Fresh in Eternity
- Origin: Winnipeg, Manitoba
- Genre: Christian Rap
- Years active: 2000–present
- Labels: Verb; Red Sea; Avante; Kingdom Group, Convurgent
- Website: http://www.freshmusic.ca

Rob Wilson, better known by his stage name Fresh I.E., is a Christian rap artist from Winnipeg, Manitoba, Canada.

== Biography ==
Fresh I.E. is an ordained minister and used to run the Joshua House drop-in centre and Education Direction Inspiration for Youth (EDIFY) mentorship program at the Waves of Glory Church in Winnipeg, which is now based out of Soul Sanctuary Church in Winnipeg.

His albums Red Letterz and Truth is Fallin' in tha Streetz were both nominated for Grammy Awards. Wilson is the first Canadian Christian artist to have been nominated for a Grammy Award. He has won several GMA Canada Covenant Awards including Rap/Hip Hop Song of the Year for World Vision (2006). Wilson founded the recording label Kingdom Music Inc. in 2006.

== Discography ==
=== Albums ===
- The Revelation (2000)
- 28:3 (Verb Records, 2001) (with Jon Loeppky)
- Tha Wordship and Tha Praise (2002)
- Red Letterz (Red Sea Records, 2003, review)
- Truth Is Fallin' In Tha Streetz (Red Sea Records, 2005, review)
- Kingdom Music Vol. 1 (2005)
- The Warren Project (Avante Records, 2007)
- Lockjaw (Kingdom Music Group, 2008)
- Out Tha Oven (2009)
- Inside (2010)
- Ends of the Earth (2010)
- The Death of a Rapper (2011)
- City of Worship (2012)
- Red Letterz 13 (2013)
- Collide: City of Worship 2 (Convurgent Music, 2015)
- The Greatest (Great-Test) (Convurgent Music, 2017)

=== Collaborations ===
- Singles (Hear the Music, 2008, EP) (with Jon Buller)
- "Everything We Need" (2009, video) (with Steve Bell)
- co-wrote "Swagger" with Philly 5 on his album Hard Pressed (Kingdom Music, 2010)

=== Notable appearances ===
- vocals on "Where My Soldiers At?", on DiJohn's album The Revolution (2006)
- vocals on "Soul Purpose", on Supaman's album Deadly Penz (2009)
- vocals on "Get a Bed", on Paul Brandt's single album Get a Bed feat. Fresh I.E. (2014)

=== Songs on compilations ===
- GMA Canada presents 30th Anniversary Collection, World Vision (CMC, 2008)

== Awards and recognition ==
Aboriginal Peoples Choice Award

- 2008 nominee, Best Rap or Hip Hop CD: Lockjaw

GMA Canada Covenant Awards

- 2004 Rap/Hip Hop/Dance Album of the Year: Red Letterz
- 2006 Rap/Hip Hop Song Of The Year: "World Vision"
- 2006 nominee, Rap/Hip Hop Album Of The Year: Truth Is Fallin’ In Tha Street
- 2007 nominee, Rap/Hip Hop Song Of The Year: "Live On" (Rob Wilson and Matt Brotzel)
- 2007 nominee, Urban/R&B/Soul Song Of The Year: "One More Day"
- 2008 Rap/Hip Hop Album Of The Year: Lockjaw
- 2008 Rap/Hip Hop Song Of The Year: "Heat" (Rob Wilson and Rob James)
- 2009 Urban/R&B/Soul Song Of The Year: "You"
- 2009 Video of the Year: "Crystal"
- 2010 Rap/Hip Hop Song Of The Year: "Homeless"

Grammy Awards

- 2004 nominee, Best Rock Gospel Album: Red Letterz
- 2006 nominee, Best Rock Gospel Album: Truth Is Fallin' In Tha Streetz

Juno Awards

- 2005 nominee, Contemporary Christian/Gospel Album of the Year: Red Letterz

Shai Awards (formerly The Vibe Awards)

- 2004 Rap/Hip-Hop/Dance Album Of The Year: Red Letterz

Western Canadian Music Awards

- 2004 nominee, Outstanding Christian Recording: Red Letterz
- 2006 Outstanding Christian Recording: Truth Is Fallin' In Tha Streetz
- 2007 Outstanding Christian Recording: The Warren Project
- 2008 nominee, Outstanding Christian Recording: LockJaw
- 2010 for the 2010 WCM Awards to be announced October 24, 2010 Fresh I.E. received a nomination for Contemporary Christian/Gospel Recording of the Year: Inside
