= Mark Masri =

Canadian singer, songwriter and producer (born 1973)

- Born: Mark Masri; 23 August 1973 (age 53); Toronto, Ontario, Canada
- Genres: Pop; classical crossover; gospel; adult contemporary; contemporary Christian music
- Occupations: singer, composer, songwriter, producer
- Years active: 2000–present
- Label: EMI
- Website: markmasri.com

Mark Masri (born 23 August 1973) is a Canadian singer, songwriter and producer. He is signed to the EMI record label and has released five albums: Mark Masri, La Voce, Christmas Is..., A Christmas Time with You, and Intimo, as well as a special US release: See My Face US. He sings in English and also has a multilingual repertoire of interpretations. On his album La Voce he sings a collection of classic songs in six languages. He joined The Tenors in 2022.

== History ==
Mark Masri was born to a Lebanese immigrant father, a Pentecostal minister, and a Canadian mother, a banker. He moved with his family from Ontario to various locations including Quebec and Nova Scotia. He started singing in his father's small church near Antigonish, Nova Scotia, when he was nine. The family returned to Scarborough, Ontario in the 1980s. At twelve he was singing in local churches and giving piano recitals. He led in many choirs and worked as a music producer for the CTS network. When his job position was eliminated, he decided to devote all his time to music. In 2000 he released his first album, self-titled Mark Masri.

After Masri recorded a demo with Amy Sky, on a song she thought might suit Jim Brickman, he was very interested and invited Masri in 2008 to tour with him. They also collaborated on Brickman's hit "Christmas Is..." that reached No. 18 on Billboard Hot Adult Contemporary Tracks. Masri also appeared as a guest vocalist on Jim Brickman's 2009 CD Faith, which was nominated for Best New Age Album at the Grammy Awards.

He is married to Angela since 1998 and they have a son together.

== Awards and nominations ==
- In 2001, nominated for a Juno Award in the category Best Gospel Album for Mark Masri
- In 2001, winner of the GMA Canada Covenant Award for
  - Pop Album of the Year: Mark Masri
  - Contemporary Gospel Song Of The Year: "Dwell In The House"
  - Pop Song Of The Year: "Take My Hand" (with Madeline Stone and Bernie Herms)
- In 2010, winner of the GMA Canada Covenant Award for three categories:
  - Classical – Traditional Song of the Year for "Time" (Mark Masri featuring Nita Whitaker) (Mark Masri jointly with Amy Sky))
  - Classical – Traditional Album of the Year for La Voce
  - Inspirational Song of the Year for "Hold On" ((Mark Masri jointly with Adam Crossley and John Acosta

== Discography ==
=== Albums ===
- 2000: Mark Masri (independent limited edition)
- 2008: See My Face (only in the United States)
- 2009: Christmas Is...
- 2010: La Voce
- 2010: A Christmas Time with You
- 2011: Intimo
- 2014: Mark Masri Live (CD and DVD)
- 2016: Beating Heart

=== Featured ===
- 2008: "Christmas Is" by Jim Brickman feat. Mark Masri – reached No. 18 on Billboard Hot Adult Contemporary Tracks
- 2009: "Breathe, Dream, Pray, Love" in album Home (Jim Brickman feat. Mark Masri and Delta Goodrem)
- 2010: "To Be Wanted" by Olivia Newton-John feat. Mark Masri appeared on Newton-John's album Grace and Gratitude – Renewed edition) (United States release). The album reached US Billboard New Age albums chart at No. 2, Billboard Christian albums chart at No. 36 and Billboard Christian/Gospel albums chart at No. 54.
- 2010: "Waiting" (Rosanna Riverso feat. Mark Masri) on her album Let There Be Peace
