= Jordan St. Cyr =

Canadian musician

- Born: Niverville, Manitoba
- Genres: CCM; Christian country
- Occupations: Singer; Songwriter
- Labels: BEC Recordings
- Website: jordanstcyr.com

Jordan St. Cyr is a Canadian Christian singer-songwriter, best known for the songs "Weary Traveler" and "Fires", which charted on Billboard's Christian radio charts. St. Cyr's self-titled debut album received a Juno Award in 2023.

== Early life ==
St. Cyr grew up in Niverville, Manitoba and began playing music in his youth ministry.

== Career ==
In 2021, Billboard magazine named St. Cyr the No. 2 Top New Christian Artist. His 2021 song "Fires" became a Top 20 hit on the Billboard Christian radio charts, and his 2021 song "Weary Traveler" was his first career No. 1 single. It reached the top position on several charts, including Christian Airplay, Adult Contemporary, and it became the song most played on Canadian Christian radio in 2022. St. Cyr said he wrote the song during the height of the COVID-19 pandemic. In early 2022, he played at the March for Life in Washington, D.C. and he toured with Anne Wilson and Jeremy Camp. In November 2022, St. Cyr won six prizes at the GMA Canada Covenant Awards. In 2023, St. Cyr won a Juno Award for Best Contemporary Christian/Gospel album for his album Jordan St. Cyr.

== Personal life ==
St. Cyr is married and has two sons and two daughters. In February 2022, he and his family moved to Murfreesboro, Tennessee.

St. Cyr advocates for the pro-life movement.
