= Jacob Moon =

Canadian folk singer and guitarist

- Origin: Hamilton, Ontario, Canada
- Genre: Folk music
- Occupations: Singer; songwriter; producer
- Instruments: Guitar; vocals
- Years active: 1994–present
- Label: Signpost Music
- Website: www.jacobmoon.com

Jacob Moon is a solo Canadian folk singer/songwriter and guitarist based in Hamilton, Ontario, Canada. He has an extensive repertoire of songs, with nine albums to his credit. He has won many accolades and has been invited to perform for and with some of his heroes, including Rush, Marillion, Ron Sexsmith and Gordon Lightfoot. Moon's famous YouTube cover of Rush's Subdivisions went viral in 2009 and has earned him many fans around the world.

== Musical career ==
Jacob Moon grew up in Kitchener-Waterloo and graduated from Wilfrid Laurier University (WLU) with a B.A. (hon.) in music. In the early years, he taught guitar lessons while pursuing his career in music. His touring schedule took off after the 2002 release of independently produced Landing. His concert dates have taken him across Canada and the United States. Although he does sometimes perform with a full band, Moon is known primarily as a solo artist, and his live performances feature extended use of Live looping. Moon has opened for other artists such as Martyn Joseph, David Wilcox, Steve Bell and Jodi King, and he has also toured with the Mike Janzen Trio. He played as a session guitarist on several Ken Baird's albums. He is also credited with the choir arrangement on Bethany Yarrow's 2003 album Rock Island. Jacob Moon is a member of the Songwriters Unite! songwriters' collective. He has won and been nominated for several prestigious music industry awards as both a performer and as a songwriter.

When Rush was inducted into the Canadian Songwriter's Hall of Fame in 2010, they asked Moon to perform his version of "Subdivisions" at the ceremony, after noticing him through a viral online video of him playing the song. He was asked to sing at the 2010 Rush convention and at the premiere screening of "Beyond the Lighted Stage" at Princess Cinemas in Waterloo on July 2, 2010.

In November 2013, Moon released a new collection of covers entitled 'Fascination' containing works by Rush, Yes, Marillion, Radiohead, Peter Gabriel, Keane, Tom Waits and two original songs never before recorded. Also in November 2013, he toured Europe opening for Marillion in UK, France, Netherlands and Germany. http://www.marillion.com/tour

=== Discography ===
==== Albums/CDs ====
On the Trail

- Released: 1994
- Format: CD
- Label: Indie
- Sales: 500 copies

Among the Thieves (10-year retrospective podcast)

- Released: 1998
- Format: CD/MP3
- Label: Indie
- Producer: Michael J. Birthelmer
- Tracks: "Queen of the Western World", "Matter Of Time", "No One Looks Up", "Hamilton Mountain", "Never Make It Right", "Liberty", "Among The Thieves", "Lights Out", "Live in Me", "Leaving"

The World I Left Behind

- Released: 2000
- Format: CD/MP3
- Label: Indie
- Producer: Jacob Moon
- Tracks: "Does He Know (Something I Don't Know)", "There's A Place", "Forgive Me", "One Tragedy Away", "Summer Days", "Siren Song", "Chelseaville", "Herky Jerky", "Dependence", "The World I Left Behind"

Landing (reviews)

- Released: 2002
- Format: CD/MP3
- Label: Signpost
- Producer: Glen Marshall, Jacob Moon
- Tracks: "Back To You", "We Will Overcome", "The End Of Me And You", "Something Within Me", "Under African Skies", "Leaving", "Travis", "My Life Of Crime", "There's A Place", "I Know You By Heart", "Everything's Gonna Be Allright"

Eventide (reviews)

- Released: 2005
- Format: CD/MP3
- Label: Signpost
- Producer: Glen Marshall
- Tracks: "Never Give Up On You", "Okay on My Own", "Magnolia", "Come Talk To Me", "Alone in New York", "Ring Them Bells", "Jesus I'll Never Forget", "Just Like You", "Tell Me Why", "The Pearl"

This Christmas (Christmas seasonal; review)

- Released: 2007
- Format: CD/MP3
- Label: Signpost
- Producer: Jacob Moon
- Tracks: "Winter Song", "It Came Upon A Midnight Clear", "Once in Royal David's City", "Rise Up Shepherd And Follow", "I Saw Three Ships", "O Come, O Come, Emmanuel", "See Amid The Winter's Snow", "This Christmas", "In The Bleak Midwinter", "Go Tell It on the Mountain", "You Gotta Get Up"

The Loop (review)

- Released: 2008
- Format: CD/MP3
- Label: Signpost
- Producer: Jacob Moon
- Tracks: "Come Talk To Me", "The Great Beyond", "Not Gonna Lose", "I'm Sorry", "You've Got Soul", "Hide And Seek", "Subdivisions", "Alone in NY", "Just Like You", "Esperanto"

Maybe Sunshine

- Released: 2009
- Format: CD/MP3 (EP)
- Label: Signpost
- Producer: Jacob Moon
- Tracks: "Sara", "End of the Road", "Children of the World", "Memory of the Dark", "Great Beyond", "All Things Old"

Landing 2: the 10th Anniversary Concert

- Released: 2012
- Format: CD/MP3
- Label: Moonbeam Music
- Producer: Jacob Moon
- Tracks: "Live a Little", "Back to You", "We Will Overcome", "The End of Me and You", "Something Within Me", "Bend and Break", "Under African Skies", "Leaving", "The Way It Is", "Oh Love", "Travis", "Speak to Me", "Disappear", "I Know You By Heart", "Everything's Gonna Be Alright"

Fascination

- Released: 2013
- Format: CD/MP3
- Label: Moonbeam Music
- Producer: Jacob Moon
- Tracks: "Limelight", "Is That All You Got?", "Let Down", "Kayleigh", "Lavender", "Owner of a Lonely Heart", "Bend and Break", "Revelation", "Pony", "Subdivisions", "In Your Eyes"

20 YEARS: The Best of Jacob Moon

- Released: 2015
- Format: CD/MP3
- Label: Moonbeam Music
- Producer: Jacob Moon
- Tracks: "Live A Little", "Love Of Mine", "Revelation", "Magnolia", "Just Like You", "Alone in New York", "Ribbon Of Darkness", "Chelseaville", "Sara", "Emmanuel", "End of the Road", "Subdivisions", "Great Beyond", "Leaving", "Everything's Gonna Be Alright", "Is That All You Got"

Jacob's music is distributed through CDBaby and iTunes, except for his first album which is no longer in print. His albums since Landing (2002) have Canadian distribution through Signpost Music.

=== Songs in other projects ===
- Signpost Collections Vol. 1, "We Will Overcome", (Signpost, 2003)
- December Songs: the Design Hope Songwriters Project, Vol. 2, "Once in Royal David's City", (Design Hope, 2007)
- Sea to Sea: Christmas, "It Came Upon A Midnight Clear" (Lakeside, 2009) Unauthorized pressing (no clearance given by artist)

=== Collaborations ===
- co-wrote the lyrics for "I Will Gather You" with Glen Soderholm on his album: World Without End (Signpost, 2006)
- inspired Mike Janzen of The Penny Merchants to release a solo jazz album: Beginnings: Live (Signpost, 2006)
- co-wrote several songs on his albums with Glen Soderholm, including: "Never Give Up On You" and "Magnolia" on Eventide, and "This Christmas" on This Christmas (2007)
- co-wrote "The Kingdom of Heaven" with Jon Buller on his album: Light Up The Sky (Signpost, 2009)

=== Notable appearances ===
- harmony vocals on "I Will Gather You" on Glen Soderholm's World Without End (Signpost, 2006)
- vocals on "Mary" and "There's A Star", on Ali Matthews' album Looking for Christmas (Shake a Paw, 2008)
- guitars on Isobelle Gunn's 'Flesh on Steel' CD
- lead vocal and guitar on "Millennium Kids" anthem for G20 conference, June 2010
- Lead Vocal and Guitar on "Something For Nothing", from Rush's 2016 Remaster of their album 2112.

== Awards and recognition ==
GMA Canada Covenant Awards

- 2007 nominee, Recorded Song of the Year: "Just Like You"
- 2007 nominee, Folk/Roots Song Of The Year: "Just Like You"
- 2008 Seasonal Album Of The Year: This Christmas
- 2010 for the 2010 Covenant Awards to be announced October 29, 2010 Moon received a nomination for Folk-Roots Song of the Year: "Sara"

Hamilton Music Awards

- 2005 nominee, Record of the Year: Eventide
- 2005 nominee, Best Male Artist: Eventide
- 2005 nominee, Male Vocalist Of The Year: Eventide
- 2005 nominee, Guitarist Of The Year
- 2005 nominee, Best Folk Recording: Eventide

Shai Awards (formerly The Vibe Awards)

- 2004 Folk Album Of The Year: Landing

Toronto Independent Music Awards

- 2006 Folk Artist of the Year
- 2008 nominee, Best Live-Acoustic Artist

Unisong International Song Contest

- (year unknown) winner, Gospel/Christian Song: "Lights Out"
- 2005 honorable mention, Pop Ballad: "Alone In New York"
- 2005 second place, Gospel/Christian Song: "Just Like You"
- 2006 Song Of The Month, January: "Just Like You"

West Coast Songwriters Song Contest

- 2007 Gospel/Inspirational Song: "Just Like You"

== Personal life ==
Jacob was married on December 31, 2005. He and his wife Allison live in Hamilton, Ontario. They adopted a boy named Gabriel in May 2010, his brother Simon in 2011, and their sister Amelia in 2014.

== See also ==
- Contemporary Christian Music
- Signpost Music
