= Ali Matthews =

- Origin: Stratford, Ontario, Canada
- Genres: Contemporary Christian; country; folk; pop
- Occupations: Singer; songwriter; producer
- Instruments: Acoustic guitar; piano; vocals
- Years active: 2000–present
- Labels: Shake a Paw Music
- Website: www.alimatthews.com

Ali Matthews is a Canadian Contemporary Christian musician and songwriter from Stratford, Ontario, Canada.

== Musical career ==
Ali Matthews began her career as a performing artist and songwriter while still in her teens. Her debut album Patchwork was released in 2000. Ali performs with guitarist and co-producer Rick Francis, and sometimes with a seven-piece band named The Good China. She is a graduate of The University of Western Ontario and is married.

Ali has won fifteen Gospel Music Association Canada Covenant Awards, was nominated for a further thirteen, and has been nominated for seven Shai Awards.

== Discography ==
Albums

Patchwork

- Released: 2000
- Producer: Rick Francis and Ali Matthews
- Tracks: "All That You're Missing", "Can't Walk Away", "Soundtrack to My History", "Taking Me Away", "Brave Enough", "This Cross", "Cry No More", "Winter", "Nobody's Fool", "Jacob", "Hunger Mountain", "Wide Awake", "Time Will Never Tell"

On Angels' Wings

- Released: 2001
- Producer: Rick Francis and Ali Matthews
- Tracks: "On Angels' Wings", "Christmas Time Is Here", "Let It Snow, Let It Snow, Let It Snow", "Emmanuel", "Mary Did You Know", "Let There Be Peace On Earth", "The Christmas Song", "All Is Calm / Silent Night", "Away in a Manger", "O Holy Night", "Have Yourself A Mary Little Christmas", "Emmanuel (Instrumental)", "Brand New Miracle", "After The Song (Prelude)", "After The Song"

Where You Remain

- Released: 2004
- Producer: Rick Francis and Ali Matthews
- Tracks: "Be Thou My Vision", "Lord of the Starfields", "To Know You", "Where You Remain", "Reaching", "Emmanuel", "Bring Us Love", "When I Survey The Wondrous Cross", "The Lord Is My Shepherd (The 23rd Psalm)", "Let All Mortal Flesh Keep Silence", "Hunger Mountain", "Wide Awake", "Treasure", "This Cross", "Let There Be Peace On Earth", "To Know You (Instrumental)"
- Singles: "To Know You"

Window of Light (review)

- Released: 2006
- Producer: Rick Francis and Ali Matthews
- Tracks: "Sweeter Than Wine (Prelude)", "Window Of Light", "Poised for a Fall", "Santorini", "When The Silence Falls", "Silence Falls (Reprise)", "Hearts Without Scars", "You Knew My Name", "Sweeter Than Wine", "Hear The Rumble", "Give It Away", "Lay It Down", "The Weapon and the Wound", "Which Way Is Home (The Prayer of the Prodigal)", "Time Will Never Tell", "Sweeter Than Wine (Instrumental)", "Little Hands"

Looking for Christmas (reviews)

- Released: 2008
- Producer: Rick Francis and Ali Matthews
- Tracks: "Love Came Down at Christmas", "I'll Be Home For Christmas", "Looking For Christmas", "It Came Upon A Midnight Clear", "The Cry Of Bethlehem", "Mary", "The First Noel", "There's A Star", "Get Me Through December", "In The Bleak Midwinter", "Silver Bells", "One Small Child", "O Come O Come Emmanuel / What Child Is This", "Counting Your Blessings", "Celebrate Me Home", "The Cry Of Bethlehem (Instrumental)"

Carry Me Home (review)

- Released: 2010
- Producer: Rick Francis and Ali Matthews
- Tracks: "Somewhere Beyond", "Without You Here", "Break God's Heart", "All The Diamonds in the World", "Nothing So Rare", "Tourist", "A Little Faith", "God Only Knows", "Whole Again (The Humpty Dumpty Song)", "To Make You Feel My Love", "Taking Me Away", "Fly", "Carry Me Home", "Carry Me Home (instrumental)", "Give Me Jesus"

Notable appearances

- Vocals on "Under African Skies", "Leaving", and "Speak to Me", on Jacob Moon's album Landing 2: the 10th Anniversary Concert (Moonbeam Music, 2012)

Songs on compilations

- Sea to Sea: I See The Cross, "Lord of the Starfields" (CMC, 2005)
- 27th Annual Covenant Hits, "On Angels' Wings" (CMC, 2006)
- Sea to Sea: The Voice of Creation, "You Knew My Name" (CMC, 2007)
- 28th Annual Covenant Hits, "Sweeter Than Wine" (CMC, 2007)
- GMA Canada presents 30th Anniversary Collection, "Hunger Mountain" (CMC, 2008)
- Sea to Sea: Christmas, "The Cry Of Bethlehem" (Lakeside, 2009)

== Awards and recognition ==
GMA Canada Covenant Awards

- 2004 Inspirational Album of the Year: Where You Remain
- 2004 Country/Bluegrass/Southern Gospel Song Of The Year: "Hunger Mountain"
- 2005 Seasonal Song Of The Year: "On Angels' Wings"
- 2006 Folk/Roots Album Of The Year: Window Of Light
- 2006 Folk/Roots Song of the Year: "Poised For A Fall"
- 2006 Country/Bluegrass Song Of The Year: "Sweeter Than Wine"
- 2006 Seasonal Song Of The Year: "Brand New Miracle" (songwriters Ali Matthews and Rick Francis)
- 2007 four nominations: Female Vocalist Of The Year, Song Of The Year: "Window Of Light" (Ali Matthews and Rick Francis), Folk/Roots Song Of The Year: "Which Way Is Home (The Prayer Of The Prodigal)", and Jazz/Blues Song Of The Year: "Window Of Light" (Ali Matthews and Rick Francis)
- 2008 Instrumental Song Of The Year: "The Cry Of Bethlehem"
- 2008 Seasonal Song Of The Year: "The Cry Of Bethlehem"
- 2009 Seasonal Album Of The Year: Looking For Christmas
- 2011 Four awards, including: Female Vocalist Of The Year, Album Of The Year: Carry Me Home, Folk/Roots Song Of The Year: "God Only Knows" and CD/DVD Artwork Design Of The Year: Carry Me Home
- 2012: Female Vocalist Of The Year

International Songwriting Competition (ISC)

- 2006 third place, Lyrics Only: "Poised For A Fall"

Just Plain Folks Music Awards

- 2006 Contemporary Christian Album: Where You Remain

Shai Awards (formerly The Vibe Awards)

- 2007 nominee, Artist of the Year
