= Carried Away (band) =

Canadian Christian musical group

- Origin: Ontario, Canada
- Genres: Contemporary Christian music
- Years active: 2000–2009
- Labels: Glide
- Members: Pam Walker; Christine Prankard
- Past members: Colleen Walker; Tyler Seidenberg
- Website: CarriedAway.AJWEngineering.com

Carried Away was a Canadian contemporary Christian musical group from Ontario, Canada. Signed to independent record label Glide Records until 2009, the group released three studio albums.

== History ==
Pam Walker and Colleen Walker are sisters who, along with their cousin Christine Prankard, formed the group Carried Away in 2000. The women were inspired by the song "Carried Away" by Sonicflood, in which Jeff Deyo sang the chorus. They met producer Otto Price in Nashville who had co-written the song. Price agreed to produce Carried Away's debut album in 2005, Closer to You, which included the eponymous song with Deyo. Price was also a producer for Christian rock girl band BarlowGirl throughout its career. The album had two number-one hit singles in Canada and also won two GMA Canada Covenant Awards that year.

The group subsequently produced its music independently, without further help from Price. I Want You, Carried Away's sophomore album, was released in 2007. It received three nominations for that year's GMA Canada Covenant Awards. Of these, the group won the Pop/Contemporary Song of the Year award for "I Want You". The album received a second subsequent nomination for Pop/Contemporary Album of the Year in 2008, but it lost once again.

On June 20, 2008, Colleen Walker left Carried Away and was replaced by Tyler Seidenberg. The group went on to release the studio album No Compromise, and a Christmas EP I Saw Lights. Tyler Seidenberg left the band sometime in 2009.

== Achievements ==
GMA Canada Covenant Awards

Year	Award	Result
2005	Pop/Contemporary Album of the Year (Closer to You)	Won
2005	Song of the Year ("I Know")	Won
2007	Pop/Contemporary Album of the Year (I Want You)	Nominated
2007	Pop/Contemporary Song of the Year ("I Want You")	Won
2007	Seasonal Song of the Year ("Soaring Through the Sky")	Nominated
2007	Song of the Year ("Mystery")	Nominated
2008	Pop/Contemporary Album of the Year (I Want You)	Nominated
2008	Seasonal Song of the Year ("Snow Falls")	Nominated
2009	Album of the Year (No Compromise)	Nominated
2009	Pop/Contemporary Album of the Year (No Compromise)	Nominated
2009	Seasonal Song of the Year ("More Like Christmas")	Nominated

== Discography ==
=== Closer to You (2005) ===
Closer to You

Studio album by Carried Away
- Released: February 2004
- Genre: Christian pop
- Length: 48:50
- Label: Glide
- Producer: Otto Price

1. "I Will Live for You"
2. "Lift"
3. "Jesus Beautiful Jesus"
4. "Closer to You"
5. "Be Exalted"
6. "Carried Away" (with Jeff Deyo of Sonicflood)
7. "Spinning Around"
8. "Alive"
9. "Hallelujah"
10. "I Know"
11. "Let It Flow"
12. "My Delight"

=== I Want You (2007) ===
I Want You

Studio album by Carried Away
- Released: August 28, 2007
- Genre: Christian pop
- Length: 47:15
- Label: Glide
- Producer: Rob Hawkins

Album release
No.	Title	Length
1.	"Black and White"	3:39
2.	"Just Believe"	3:47
3.	"Smile"	3:42
4.	"I Want You"	3:42
5.	"Over Me"	4:16
6.	"Mystery"	5:56
7.	"I Feel It Inside"	3:05
8.	"Wasting My Words"	4:17
9.	"Sweet One"	5:20
10.	"Your Love"	3:35
11.	"Alive"	3:56
12.	"Holy, Holy, Holy"	2:00
Total length:		47:15

"Alive" was originally featured on Closer to You. The song was rerecorded for I Want You with different instrumentation and vocals, replacing the strings with a rockier sound and including a choir from the bridge onward.

=== No Compromise (2009) ===
No Compromise

Studio album by Carried Away
- Released: April 30, 2009
- Genre: Christian pop
- Length: 37:18
- Label: Glide

Album release
No.	Title	Length
1.	"Everyday"	3:27
2.	"Letting Go"	3:57
3.	"Yours"	3:28
4.	"No Compromise"	3:50
5.	"Wait"	3:57
6.	"Worry (Won't Make You Happy)"	3:40
7.	"Hello"	3:16
8.	"Stay the Same"	4:16
9.	"Where Will She Go"	3:00
10.	"Right Where You Are"	4:27
Total length:		37:18

=== I Saw Lights (2009) ===
1. "More Like Christmas"
2. "O Holy Night"
3. "I Saw Lights"
4. "Silent Night"
5. "Snow Falls"

Of these songs, "Snow Falls" was previously released on December 3, 2007 and "More Like Christmas" was previously released on November 25, 2008. Whereas the original "Snow Falls" had a fade out effect at the end, the I Saw Lights version uses an echo effect instead.

=== Singles ===
- "I Know" (2005)
- "Soaring Through the Sky" (2006)
- "Mystery" (2007)
- "Snow Falls" (2007)
- "More Like Christmas" (2008)

=== Appearances ===
- 27th Annual Covenant Hits, "I Know" (CMC, 2006)
- Sea to Sea: The Voice of Creation, "Mystery" (CMC, 2007)
- GMA Canada presents 30th Anniversary Collection, "I Know" (CMC, 2008)
- Sea to Sea: Christmas, "More Like Christmas" (Lakeside, 2009)

=== Music videos ===
- Lift (2005)
- I Know (2006)
- "Alive" (2008)
