= Toronto Mass Choir =

The Toronto Mass Choir is a Canadian gospel music group that ties contemporary and traditional gospel with jazz, funk, soul, blues, and sounds of the Caribbean. The choir has recorded twelve albums. Numbering 35 singers plus a five-piece band, the not for profit choir consists of adult members who are from various local church across the Greater Toronto Area Karen Burke, a graduate of McMaster University, the Royal Conservatory of Music and a professor of music at York University, is the director of the group along with her husband, Oswald Burke, who is their executive producer.

Toronto Mass Choir has appeared on radio and television broadcasts for stations such as CTS, CBC Radio One, CITY-TV and has been the focus for several television documentaries.

Toronto Mass Choir is the host of the annual PowerUp Gospel Conference.

== History ==
The choir was founded in 1988 by Lisa Brown, Courtney Williams, and Karen and Oswald Burke.

Seeds of this choir were sown during the choir's initial live recording concert as part of the Association of Gospel Music Ministries workshop in October 1988.

In 2012, to kick off the choir's 25th performance season a compilation album 25 was released. This compact disc features highlights of the choir's original music of the past 25 years. That same year, TMC was awarded the Lifetime Achievement Award from the Gospel Music Association of Canada.

Toronto Mass Choir has traveled to countries including England, Poland, Hungary, Romania, Italy, Barbados, Trinidad & Tobago, Dominican Republic and the United States.

The choir has been a special guest at countless church services, festivals, award shows and venues such as The Ottawa Bluesfest, Quebec's Le Festival de Musique Sacree de Saint-Roch, the Toronto Jazz Festival, the Canadian National Exhibition, Missionfest, the Empire Club of Canada, Roy Thompson Hall with the Toronto Symphony Orchestra, Hamilton Place with the Hamilton Philharmonic Orchestra and at the Gospel Music Workshop of America conventions in Washington, DC, Atlanta and Detroit. The choir has also appeared with well-known Gospel singers such as Tramaine Hawkins, Alvin Slaughter and Take 6, Canadian recording artists such as Michael Burgess and Jane Bunnett and jazz legend, Jon Hendricks.

== Mission ==
To create and perform Gospel music that will draw all people into the presence of God.

== Discography ==
Albums include the Juno award winning album, Instrument of Praise, which won Contemporary Christian/Gospel album of the Year in 2003; Going Home, an all Caribbean gospel project in 2008, a Christmas album entitled A Christmas Gift in 2010, and a worship album entitled Made for Worship which was released in May 2014 as a CD+DVD combo. Its most recent album By Special Request was released in June 2018.

- 1989 - Great Is Thy Glory, Micah Records
- 1994 - God Is Our Hope, Micah Records
- 1994 - The Early Years, Micah Records
- 1998 - Follow Him, Micah Records
- 2002 - Instrument of Praise, Micah Records
- 2005 - The Live Experience, Micah Records
- 2007 - Going Home, Micah Records
- 2010 - A Christmas Gift, Micah Records
- 2012 - Songs From The Evolution of Gospel Music, Micah Records
- 2012 - 25: Twenty-Fifth Anniversary Collection, Burke Music Inc.
- 2014 - Made For Worship, Burke Music Inc.
- 2015 - Made For Worship: Special Edition, Burke Music Inc.
- 2018 - By Special Request, Burke Music Inc.
- 2019 - PowerUp Gospel Live, Burke Music Inc.
- 2022 - Celebration Live, Burke Music Inc.
