= Warren Dean Flandez =

Canadian gospel and rhythm and blues singer

Warren Dean Flandez is a Canadian gospel and rhythm and blues singer. He is a two-time Juno Award nominee for Contemporary Christian/Gospel Album of the Year, receiving nods at the Juno Awards of 2017 for Eternally Grateful and at the Juno Awards of 2019 for Speak. He is also an eight-time GMA Covenant award winner.

Warren Dean Flandez is of Filipino, Polynesian, Spanish, and Chinese descent. He was born in Yellowknife, Northwest Territories and is based in Vancouver, British Columbia. He released his debut album Vintage Love in 2011, and competed in the reality show Cover Me Canada in the same year where he placed fourth in the country. The album received a Western Canadian Music Award nomination for Best Urban Album in 2012. He released the gospel EP What the World Needs Now in 2015 under the pseudonym WDF, before releasing the full-length gospel album Eternally Grateful in 2016 which in addition to his Juno Award nomination, received a Western Canadian Music Award for Spiritual Artist of the Year in 2017. In 2018, Flandez released the gospel crossover album Speak, which debuted at #1 on the iTunes Inspirational charts and #18 on the iTunes overall charts Top 100. Born for Greatness was the first single from Speak which features Riverdale star KJ Apa. 100% of first week sales of Born for Greatness were donated to Music Heals, a Canadian charity dedicated to Music Therapy.

In addition to his music career, Flandez launched the Vancouver-based arts project Studio Cloud 30, a multidisciplinary artist development studio with locations in Vancouver, Burnaby and Tsawwassen.

In 2021, Flandez's home designed by his architect father, Dennis Flandez, was featured in several international design publications including Architectural Digest Spain, Italy and Russia. The modern Japanese inspired home built around a central courtyard, gained international recognition including placing number 4 on AD Spain's Top 10 most viewed homes.

As a philanthropist, Flandez has worked with many charities including Warchild Canada and Canuck Place Children's Hospice. A graduate from Cornell University's Diversity and Inclusion Certificate Program, Flandez also co-founded The Harmony Initiative Society aka THIS, a non-profit society dedicated to promoting community harmony through arts and culture JEDI initiatives.
