= Andrew Marcus =

Canadian worship musician (born 1985)

- Birth name: Andrew Mark Marcus
- Born: March 29, 1985 (age 40) or March 29, 1986 (age 39); Vancouver, British Columbia, Canada
- Origin: Surrey, British Columbia, Canada
- Genres: Worship; Christian pop; Christian rock; pop rock
- Occupation(s): Singer, songwriter
- Instrument: Vocals
- Years active: 2007–present
- Labels: BEC
- Website: andrewmarcusmusic.com

Andrew Mark Marcus (born March 29, 1985, or 1986) is a Canadian worship musician. He has released five studio albums, Salvation and Glory (2007), Emptiness Speaks Volumes (2009), Our Conversation Behind the Veil (2011), When Winter Falls Summer Springs (2013) and Constant (2016).

== Background and early life ==
Marcus was born, Andrew Mark Marcus, on March 29, 1986, in Vancouver, British Columbia, Canada, as Andrew Mark Marcus, the son of Egyptian Christian immigrants, who has an older sister. He graduated from North Surrey Secondary School in 2003 or 2004 before beginning his career as a traveling worship leader at the age of 19, in 2004 or 2005. He attended college at Trinity Western University, studying business, eventually getting a youth pastors job at a new church plant in Okanagan, P.C Church, a church of the Pentecostal tradition, when he was 21-years-old in 2007. He learned pastoral theology, while he was enrolled at Christ for the Nations Bible College. He went on from Okanagan to Langley, British Columbia, where he was involved in worship at Christian Life Assembly. Marcus is the previous worship and creative arts pastor at Coquitlam Alliance Church, in Coquitlam, British Columbia, and is now the Worship Pastor at Riverside Calvary Chapel in Langley BC

== Music history ==
Marcus has released four independent studio albums, the first being, Salvation and Glory in 2007. His next three releases were Emptiness Speaks Volumes, in 2009, Our Conversation Behind the Veil, in 2011, and When Winter Falls Summer Springs, in 2013. His first released with a major label, Constant, was released on July 29, 2016, from BEC Recordings.

== Personal life ==
He got married on June 28, 2013, to his wife, Michelle.

== Discography ==
- Salvation and Glory (2007)
- Emptiness Speaks Volumes (2009)
- Our Conversation Behind the Veil (2011)
- When Winter Falls Summer Springs (2013)
- Constant (2016)
