= Londa Larmond =

- Also known as: Londa Larmond-Moncrieffe
- Born: Londa Erica Larmond; September 3, 1975 (age 50); Toronto, Ontario, Canada
- Genres: Gospel, Christian R&B, CCM, urban contemporary gospel
- Occupations: Singer, songwriter, worship leader, vocal coach, & vocal producer
- Instruments: vocals, singer-songwriter
- Years active: 1999–present
- Label: EMI Gospel
- Website: londalarmond.com

Londa Erica Larmond (née, Larmond; born September 3, 1975) is a Canadian gospel musician and worship leader, who is an urban contemporary gospel and Christian R&B recording artist, under the Christian pop umbrella. She started her music career, in 1999, with her first studio album, Love Letters, releasing in 2001. She is a GMA Award and a June Award nominee, and a Covenant Award winner.

== Early life ==
Londa Erica Larmond was born on September 3, 1975, in Toronto, Ontario, Canada, to Jamaican parents, Ethan and Evan Larmond, where she was raised with three brothers, David, Wayne & Jason. She started honing her craft by singing and performing at seven years old. Larmond sung for George W. Bush, when he was president and Jean Chrètien, when he was Prime Minister.

== Music career ==
Her music recording career began in 1999, while her first studio album, Love Letters, was released on June 19, 2001, from EMI Gospel. She was nominated for Urban Album of the Year at the 2002 GMA Dove Awards and Best Gospel Album at the 2002 June Awards, for her album Love Letters, while winning Traditional Gospel Song of the Year at the Covenant Awards in 2006, for the song "Wonderful". In October 2010, Londa recorded her sophomore, album Great Things, live and released it in 2011. She's a triple-crown winner of the Canada Glass Awards.

== Personal life ==
She resides in Toronto, with her 2 sons, Marquese and Miguel Moncrieffe. Larmond is a worship leader at Kingdom House Christian Centre.

== Discography ==
=== Guest appearances ===
- Caught Up (November 1995, Faith Chorale Gospel Music Incorporated)
- Life Is (November 3, 1998, EMI Gospel)
- The Experience (March 7, 2006, Alliant)

=== Studio and LIVE albums ===
- Love Letters (June 19, 2001, EMI Gospel)
- Great Things (June 2011, Independent)
