= LoveCollide =

American musical duo

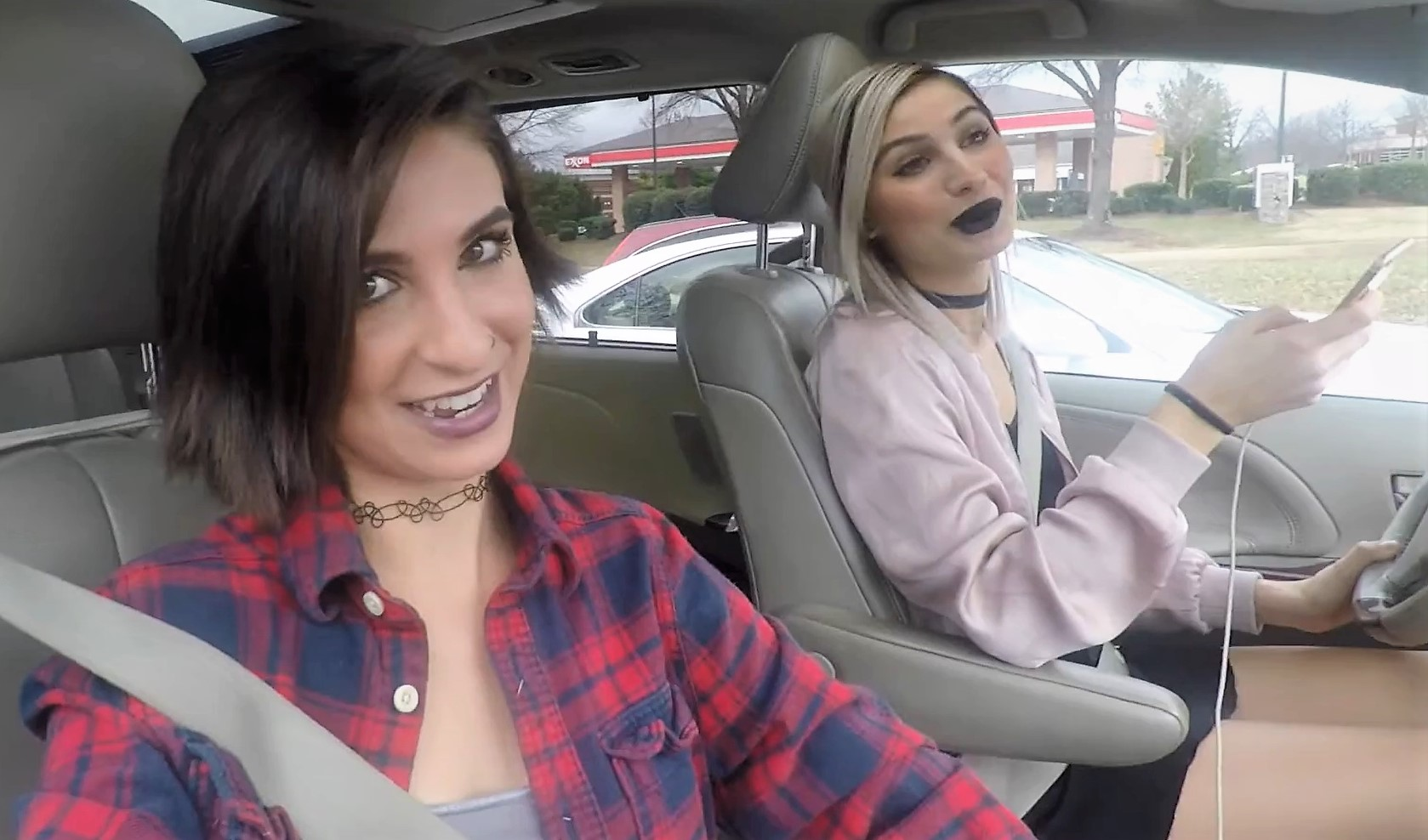
- Lauren (left) and Brooke DeLeary in 2017

Background information
- Also known as: The DeLearys
- Origin: Hickory, North Carolina
- Genres: Worship, Christian pop, Christian rock, pop rock
- Years active: 2011–present
- Members: Brooke DeLeary; Lauren DeLeary
- Website: lovecollide.com

LoveCollide, formerly known as The DeLearys, are an American musical duo consisting of sisters Brooke and Lauren DeLeary, who play Christian pop, Christian rock and a worship style of music. They originally came from Hickory, North Carolina, where the duo started making music in 2011, under their former moniker, The DeLearys. Their first extended play, I'm Out, was released in 2011, before their name change to LoveCollide. They have both since relocated to Nashville, Tennessee to pursue a profession in music. The duo have released three studio albums, LoveCollide (2014), Resonate: A Ripple to a Wave (2016) and Tired of Basic (2018), and a Christmas extended play, Fa La La Christmas.

== Background ==
The sister duo are from Hickory, North Carolina, where they started as an entity in 2011. The eldest, Lauren Alicia DeLeary, was born in Tampa, Florida, on August 27, 1993, while the youngest, Susan Brooke DeLeary, was born December 23, 1996, in Hickory, North Carolina. Lauren graduated from Belmont University, in 2014, the same year her sister graduated from high school, and now both reside in Nashville, Tennessee. Their parents are Dr. Geoffrey Donald DeLeary, a urologist, and Carrie Beth DeLeary (née, Boucher), while they have a younger brother, Matthew Skyler DeLeary.

== Music history ==
The group started in 2011 as The DeLearys, with one release under that moniker, I'm Out, an extended play. Their first studio album, LoveCollide, was released on April 8, 2014. In a song profile, "War Cry", was covered in a story from New Release Today by Kevin Davis. Their subsequent release, a Christmas extended play, Fa La La Christmas, was released on November 20, 2015. The second song profiled, "Mother of the Son of God", was done by Kevin Davis from New Release Today. Their second studio album, Resonate: A Ripple to a Wave, was released on April 29, 2016, independently. Their song, "Resonate", was profiled by Kevin Davis from New Release Today. The duo's third studio album, Tired of Basic, was released April 18, 2018, independently by artist management firm The Fuel Music.

Although based in the United States, the DeLeary sisters are of partial Canadian First Nations ancestry, and are registered members of the Chippewas of the Thames First Nation in Ontario. As such, they are also eligible for the Canadian Juno Awards, and their album Tired of Basic won the Juno Award for Contemporary Christian/Gospel Album of the Year at the Juno Awards of 2019.

== Members ==
- Lauren Alicia DeLeary (born August 27, 1993, in Tampa, Florida)
- Susan Brooke DeLeary (born December 23, 1996, in Hickory, North Carolina)

== Discography ==
Studio albums

- LoveCollide (April 8, 2014)
- Resonate: A Ripple to a Wave (April 29, 2016)
- Tired of Basic (April 13, 2018) - winner of the 2019 Juno Award

EPs

- I'm Out (December 21, 2011)
- Fa La La Christmas (November 20, 2015)
