= The Color (band) =

Canadian Christian music group

- Origin: Winkler, Manitoba, Canada
- Genres: contemporary Christian music, pop rock

The Color is a Canadian Christian music group from Winkler, Manitoba. They are a 2 time Juno Award winning band that is most noted for their 2017 album, First Day of My Life, which won the Juno Award for Contemporary Christian/Gospel Album of the Year at the Juno Awards of 2018, and their 2021 album, No Greater Love, which won the Juno Award for Contemporary Christian/Gospel Album of the Year in 2022. The band is led by Jordan Janzen as lead singer, Larry Abrams on guitar and vocals, and Tyson Unrau on drums.

The Color joined the Newsboys for over 50 dates of their U.S. tour in 2024.

== Discography ==
- The Color (2012)
- With Outlines (2013)
- Eyes Wide Open (2015)
- First Day of My Life (2017)
- No Greater Love (2021)
