= GMA Canada =

Nonprofit organization promoting Christian music

Gospel Music Association Canada
- Abbreviation: GMA Canada
- Formation: 1974
- Website: gmacanada.ca

The Gospel Music Association of Canada or GMA Canada (formerly known as the CGMA) is a not for profit association, founded in 1974, whose purpose is to promote Christian music in Canada.

== History ==
GMA Canada is created in 1974 in Ontario with Covenant Awards. At the beginning, it was mostly for gospel music. Over the years, all styles of Contemporary Christian music have been included.

In 2008 the association released a special three-CD collection to commemorate its 30th anniversary, the GMA Canada presents 30th Anniversary Collection.

== Mission ==
GMA Canada works to raise the profile and interaction of Christian artists, songwriters, producers, promoters and others working in Christian music with media, retailers, distributors and church leadership.

== Management ==
The business of the association is conducted by a board of advisors drawn from its membership. The current board consists of Gregory J. Strom (president), Gordie Cochran, Jaylene Johnson, Melayne Shenkel, and Clarence Giesbrecht. GMA Canada is loosely associated with the Gospel Music Association in the United States.

== Awards ==
GMA Canada is the presenter of the annual Covenant Awards, Canada’s national awards for the Canadian gospel music industry. The 2012 awards were presented November 7 as part of GMA Canada Week in Burlington, Ontario. Awards were handed out in 50 categories, including the GMA Canada Lifetime Achievement Award and the newly created Scott's Parable Canadian Gospel Music Song Hall Of Fame.

== GMA Canada Song Hall of Fame ==
- "The Huron Carol" (2012)

Written in 1643 by Jesuit Missionary Jean de Brébeuf The "Huron Carol" (or "Twas in the Moon of Wintertime") was admitted to GMA Canada Song Hall of Fame in 2012 as part of its inaugural year. Brébeuf wrote the lyrics in the native language of the Huron/Wendat people under the original name of "Jesous Ahatonhia" ("Jesus, He Is Born"). The melody came from the traditional French folk song "Une Jeune Pucelle" ("A Young Maid"). The English lyrics were written in 1926 by Jesse Edgar Middleton. They became public domain in 2011. The song has been recorded by many Canadian artists including Lianna Klassen, Cheryl Bear, Bruce Cockburn, Crash Test Dummies and Tom Jackson.

- "Come, Now Is the Time to Worship" (2012)

Written by Brian Doerksen in 1998. Doerksen, was born in Abbotsford, British Columbia in 1965 and is an internationally recognized worship leader and songwriter known globally for a string of well known modern worship songs including "Refiner's Fire" (1990), "Faithful One" (1998), "Hope of the Nations" (2003), "Holy God" (2006), and "Today (As For Me and My House)" (2004). He was recognized by the Gospel Music Association in the United States in 2003 with a special Dove Award for International Artist of the Year (only the second Canadian to be recognized), and has won a Juno Award and multiple GMA Canada Covenant Awards. "Come, Now Is The Time To Worship" became his most recognized song, being sung in churches around the world. It has been recorded by The Oak Ridge Boys, Phillips, Craig and Dean, VeggieTales and many others.

- "My Jesus I Love Thee" (2012)

The hymn "My Jesus I Love Thee" was written as a poem by William Ralph Featherston in 1864 when he was 16 years old. Featherston was from Montreal, Quebec and was a member of the Wesleyan Methodist Church in Montreal (later renamed St. James Methodist Church, then St. James United Church). He died in 1873. Music was added to the poem after Featherton's death in 1876 by Adoniram Gordon. The song has been recorded by hundreds of artists including The Wiebes, Paul Baloche, Amy Grant, Avalon, Capstone and Selah.

== GMA Canada Covenant Hits Compilations ==
- 27th Annual Covenant Hits (CMC, 2006)
- 28th Annual Covenant Hits (CMC, 2007)
- GMA Canada presents 30th Anniversary Collection (CMC, 2008)

== See also ==
- Music of Canada
- Covenant Awards (list of award winners)
