= Juno Award for Contemporary Christian/Gospel Album of the Year =

Canadian music award

The Juno Award for "Contemporary Christian/Gospel Album of the Year" has been awarded since 1998, as recognition each year for the best Christian/Gospel music album in Canada. A separate organization, the Gospel Music Association of Canada (GMA Canada), hands out a full array of awards for Canadian Contemporary Christian/Gospel music, covering a wide range of genres, each year with the annual Covenant Awards.

Prior to the award's introduction, gospel albums were considered for the Blues/Gospel Album category.

It is one of several categories that media reports in September 2024 indicated would be placed on "hiatus" for the Juno Awards of 2025, with the award committee reversing the decision eight days after it was first reported.

== Winners ==
=== Best Gospel Album (1998 - 2002) ===
Year	Winner	Album	Nominees	Ref.
1998	Steve Bell	Romantics & Mystics	Carolyn Arends, Feel Free; Hiram Joseph, Speak Lord to Me; Sharon Riley and Faith Chorale, Caught Up; Youth Outreach Mass Choir, Just Look	
1999	Sharon Riley and Faith Chorale	Life Is	Expression of Praise, To Whom It May Concern; Lianna Klassen, Listen to the Sound; Selections, Our Message; Toronto Mass Choir, Follow Him	
2000	Deborah Klassen	Legacy of Hope	Jon Buller, Sinner and the Saint; The LaPointes, God Only Knows; Sheryl Stacey, Sheryl Stacey; Sweetsalt. Sweetsalt	
2001	Steve Bell	Simple Songs	La Chorale du Conservatoire de Musique Moderne, Mon Seul Espoir; Kelita Haverland Naked Soul; Jake, Jake; Mark Masri, Mark Masri	
2002	Downhere	Downhere	Carolyn Arends, Travelers; Steve Bell, Waiting for Aidan; Matt Brouwer, Imagerical; Londa Larmond, Love Letters	

=== Contemporary Christian/Gospel Album of the Year (2003 - Present) ===
Year	Winner	Album	Nominees	Ref.
2003	Toronto Mass Choir	Instrument of Praise	Jake, Army of Love; Montreal Jubilation Gospel Choir, Jubilation VIII: A Cappella Plus; Northern Blues Gospel All Stars, Saved!; Starfield, Tumbling After	
2004	Jill Paquette	Jill Paquette	Bec Abbot, Shine Like Stars; Jody Cross, Forward to Forever; Downhere, So Much for Substitutes; Jim Witter, Forgiveness	
2005	Greg Sczebel	Here to Stay	Fresh I.E., Red Letterz; Aileen Lombardo, Living Water; Raylene Scarrott, Taken; Thousand Foot Krutch, Phenomenon	
2006	Amanda Falk	Amanda Falk	Janelle, Livin’ for Something; Relient K, MMHMM; Patricia Shirley, In This Time; Thousand Foot Krutch, The Art of Breaking	
2007	Downhere	Wide-Eyed and Mystified	Carolyn Arends, Pollyanna's Attic; Hawk Nelson, Smile, It's the End of the World; Manafest, Glory; Starfield, Beauty in the Broken	
2008	Brian Doerksen	Holy God	Amanda Falk, Beautiful; Relient K, Five Score and Seven Years Ago; Newworldson, Roots Revolution; Thousand Foot Krutch, The Flame in All of Us	
2009	Downhere	Ending is Beginning	Article One, Colors and Sounds; Life Support, Roar of Heaven; newworldson, Salvation Station; Starfield, I Will Go	
2010	Matt Brouwer	Where's Our Revolution	Steve Bell, Devotion; FM Static, Dear Diary; Janelle, What I Gotta Say; Thousand Foot Krutch, Welcome to the Masquerade	
2011	Greg Sczebel	Love & the Lack Thereof	Article One, Clarity; Manafest, The Chase; Newworldson, Newworldson; Starfield, The Saving One	
2012	Downhere	On the Altar of Love	Jon Bauer, Forevermore; Hawk Nelson, Crazy Love; Kellie Loder, Imperfections & Directions; Sky Terminal, Don't Close Your Eyes	
2013	The City Harmonic	I Have a Dream (It Feels Like Home)	Colin Bernard, Hold On; Manafest, Fighter; Newworldson, Rebel Transmission; Thousand Foot Krutch, The End Is Where We Begin	
2014	Tim Neufeld	Trees	Fraser Campbell, Search the Heavens; The City Harmonic, Heart; The High Bar Gang, Lost & Undone: A Gospel Bluegrass Companion; Jordan Raycroft, Jordan Raycroft	
2015	Manic Drive	VIP	Chelsea Amber, Introducing Chelsea Amber; Drew Brown, Analog Love in Digital Times; Manafest, The Moment; Tim Neufeld, The Joy	
2016	Dan Bremnes	Where the Light Is	The City Harmonic, We Are; Amanda Cook, Brave New World; Matt Maher, Saints and Sinners; Tim Neufeld, TREES - Chapter 2	
2017	Tim Neufeld & the Glory Boys	Hootenanny!	Steve Bell, Where the Good Way Lies; Warren Dean Flandez, Eternally Grateful; Jaylene Johnson, Potter & Clay; Manafest, Reborn	
2018	The Color	First Day of My Life	Love & the Outcome, These Are the Days; Matt Maher, Echoes; Manafest, Stones; Jon Neufeld, We Are Free	
2019	LoveCollide	Tired of Basic	Brian Doerksen, Grateful; Manic Drive, Into the Wild; Tim Neufeld and the Glory Boys, The Buffalo Road Show; Warren Dean Flandez, Speak	
2020	Matt Maher	The Advent of Christmas	Dan Bremnes, Wherever I Go; Brian Doerksen, The Heart of Christmas; Fresh I.E., Ill Street Blues; Brooke Nicholls, Pursue	
2021	Shawna Cain	The Way	Steve Bell, Wouldn't You Love to Know?; Allen Froese, All Things New; K-Anthony, The Cure; Matt Maher, Alive & Breathing	
2022	The Color	No Greater Love	Kevin Adams and Voices of Praise, For the Kingdom; Jennifer Lewin, Songs of the Lord; Manic Drive, Vol. 1; Movement Worship, Moments Movement	
2023	Jordan St. Cyr	Jordan St. Cyr	Dan Bremnes, Into the Wild; Daniel Ojo, Trust; Love and the Outcome, Only Ever Always; Tehillah Worship, The Church Will Rise	
2024	K-Anthony	Arrow	Stirling John, Where I'm Meant to Be; Joshua Leventhal, All Ye Lepers; Brooke Nicholls, Glory to God; Tuzee, Alive	
2025	Ryan Ofei	Restore	Elenee, Elenee; Jordan St. Cyr, My Foundation; Tehillah Worship, Miracle in the Making; Toronto Mass Choir, Hymns Alive (Live)	
2026	Ryan Ofei	Jubilate	Bridge Music, Vulnerable Too; Collect.assembly, Outlaw Gospel; Kofi Dartey, Where the Heart Is; Elenee, The Light That Leads to You	
