= Marc Martel =

Canadian Christian rock musician (born 1976)

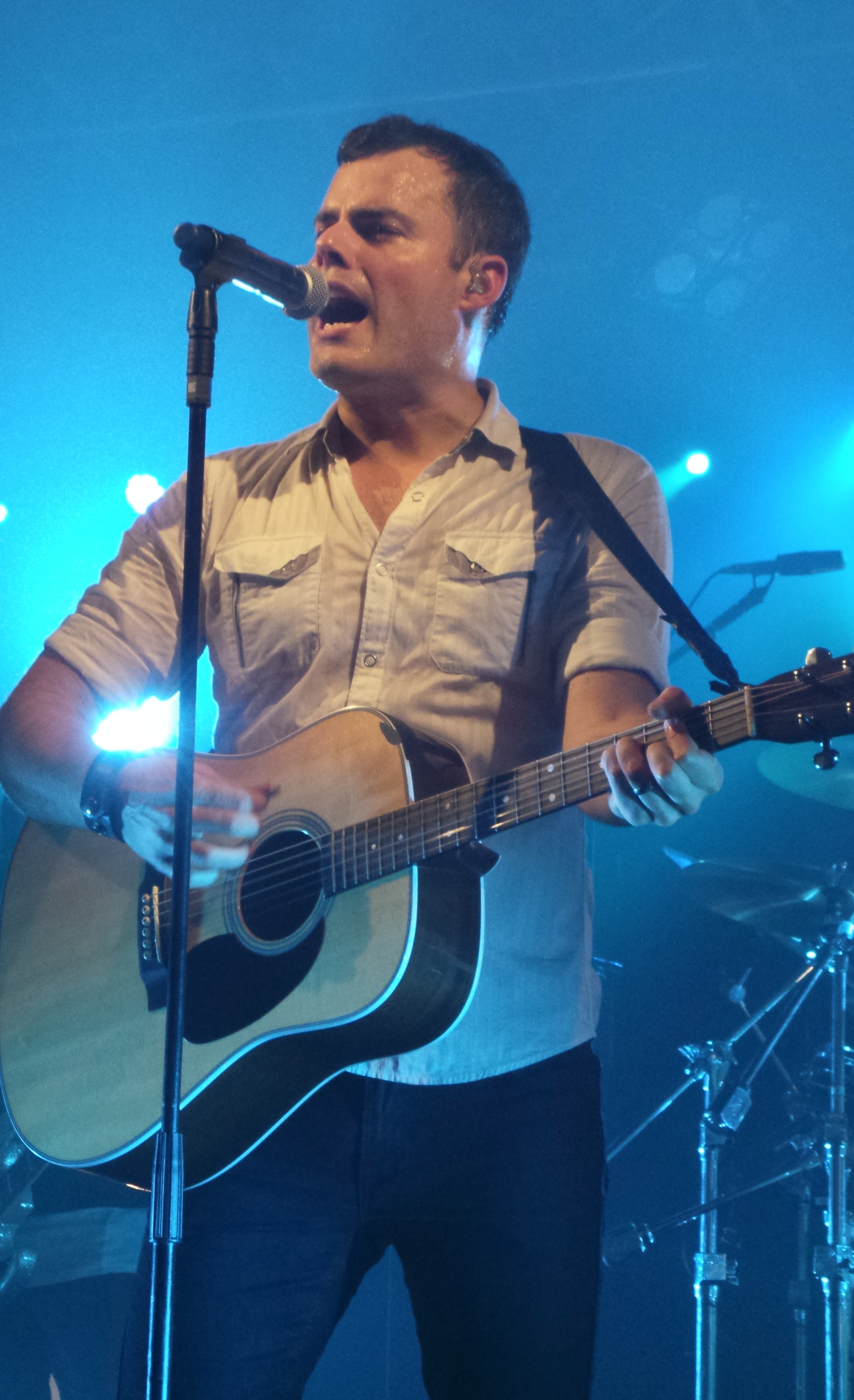
- Martel performing in 2013

Background information
- Born: November 16, 1976 (age 49); Montreal, Quebec, Canada
- Genres: Rock; Christian rock; pop
- Occupation: Musician
- Instruments: Vocals; guitar; piano; harmonica; trumpet; sitar
- Years active: 1999–present
- Member of: One Vision of Queen
- Formerly of: Queen Extravaganza, Downhere
- Website: marcmartelmusic.com

Marc Martel (born November 16, 1976) is a Canadian musician widely known for his Queen covers and vocal resemblance to Queen frontman Freddie Mercury. He provided parts of Mercury's singing voice in the 2018 biopic film Bohemian Rhapsody. Based in Nashville, Tennessee, Martel formed the band Downhere in 1999 and now performs with the cover band One Vision of Queen.

== Early life and education ==
He was born in Montreal, Canada, to Barbara Beresford and Michel Martel. He attended Briercrest College and Seminary in Caronport, Saskatchewan, where he met his roommate Jason Germain. With him and a few friends he formed the band Downhere.

== Career ==
=== Downhere (1999–2012) ===
Downhere (stylized as downhere) developed their sound while touring on behalf of Briercrest College. After four years of college, the band relocated to Nashville, Tennessee, where they signed with Word Records. Downhere went on to win multiple Juno Awards, Covenant Awards and a Dove Award. They released 10 albums, including On the Altar of Love, before going on hiatus effective January 1, 2013.

=== Solo (2013–present) ===
In September 2011, Martel entered a competition to join Roger Taylor's (original drummer for the rock band Queen) official Queen tribute project, the Queen Extravaganza, with a video of Martel singing along with the Queen classic "Somebody to Love". It generated more than one million views on YouTube after being up for only a few days and as of January 2026 it has over 23 million views. This led to an appearance on The Ellen DeGeneres Show a week following the release of the video. Martel went on to be one of the winners of the competition which led to a six-week tour with The Queen Extravaganza in 2012. The Queen Extravaganza continued to tour with Martel until the end of 2016.

Martel released an EP, Prelude, on February 1, 2013. The EP was recorded in Nashville and Los Angeles with producer John Fields. His full-length debut, Impersonator, released on September 30, 2014.

In September 2016, he collaborated on "Last Christmas", featured in the video game, Just Dance 2017. On November 18, 2016 The Silent Night EP, a collection of Christmas songs, was released. In 2017, he covered "Footloose" for Just Dance 2018.

In 2017, Martel left Queen Extravaganza and joined the Ultimate Queen Celebration.

In 2019, Martel recorded a new version of "Silver Bells" with Amy Grant and Michael W. Smith that reached No. 1 on the Billboard Christian AC Monitor charts, and the Mediabase Christian AC. This was Martel's first career No. 1 song. He accompanied them on their annual Christmas Tour.

Martel contributed vocal recordings for the Queen biographical film, Bohemian Rhapsody (2018). Film producer Graham King confirmed that Marc Martel recorded vocals for the film in a Rolling Stone article:

Most singing scenes in the movie rely on either vocal stems from Queen master tapes or new recordings by Marc Martel, a Canadian Christian rock singer whose voice is practically identical to the late frontman's. "Literally, you could close your eyes and it's Freddie," says King. "And that's a very tough thing to do."

And in an interview to FilmJournal International he revealed more details about Martel's involvement in the making of the film:

Rami sings a little bit in the film, there's a lot of Freddie Mercury obviously, and a lot of Marc Martel. He sent a video to Brian May and Roger Taylor and he sounds exactly like Freddie Mercury. We knew that we had someone we could use for parts that maybe Rami couldn't do and obviously Freddie didn't do. So we were in Abbey Road recording studio for maybe two and a half months with Marc and with Rami, recording bits and pieces that we knew we needed. It's hard to find someone who can sing like Freddie Mercury and I'm not sure the movie would have happened if we didn't have Marc.

Marc Martel provided the vocals in a commercial for The Perfect Bacon Bowl. The commercial features music in the style of Bohemian Rhapsody by Queen. Martel has also done voice work as Withered Foxy in the 2016 video game Five Nights at Freddy's World.

== Personal life ==
Martel resides in Nashville, Tennessee, with his wife, Crystal.

== Discography ==
With downhere

- downhere (independent, 1999)
- downhere (2001)
- So Much for Substitutes (2003)
- Wide-Eyed and Mystified (2006)
- Wide-Eyed and Simplified (2007)
- Thunder After Lightning (The Uncut Demos) (2007)
- Thank You for Coming (The Live Bootlegs) (2008)
- Ending Is Beginning (2008, review)
- How Many Kings: Songs for Christmas (2009)
- Two at a Time: Sneak Peeks & B-Sides (2010)
- On the Altar of Love (2011)

Solo

- The Prelude EP (2013)
- The Silent Night EP (2016)
- Impersonator (2014)
- Live at the High Watt (2016)
- A Night at the Apollo (2017)
- The First Noel EP (2017)
- My Way Vol. 1 EP (2018)
- Thunderbolt & Lightning (2018)
- Christmas Is Here EP (2018)
- The Christmas Collection (2019)
- Live in Auckland New Zealand featuring UQC (2020)
- A One Take Rhapsody (2020)
- Thank God It's Christmas (2020)
- Forte (2021)
- Hark! (2021)
- My Way Vol. 2 (2022)
- The Christmas Collection, Vol. 2 (2022)

Singles

- "Cual Otro Rey" (2020)
- "Fat Bottomed Girls" (2020)
- "Under Pressure" (2020)
- "Somebody to Love" (2021)
- "Seven Seas of Rhye/Bicycle Race" (2021)
- "Let Me Entertain You" (2021)
- "Another One Bites the Dust" (2022)
