= Juno Awards of 2009 =

Edition of Canadian music award ceremony

- Date: 28–29 March 2009
- Venue: General Motors Place, Vancouver, British Columbia
- Hosted by: Russell Peters

Television/radio coverage
- Network: CTV

The Juno Awards of 2009 honoured music industry achievements in Canada in the latter part of 2007 and in most of 2008. These ceremonies were held in Vancouver, British Columbia, Canada during the weekend ending 29 March 2009.

Loverboy was inducted into the Canadian Music Hall of Fame, and Sarah McLachlan received the Allan Waters Humanitarian Award. Long-time broadcast executive Fred Sherratt, a former CHUM Limited executive, received the Walt Grealis Special Achievement Award.

== Events ==
Preliminary award-related events began on 26 March 2009. The following day featured a Welcome Reception at the Commodore Ballroom and a Juno Cup ice hockey game at the UBC Thunderbird Arena.

Most awards were announced at a Gala Dinner and Awards which was a restricted-access, non-televised event at Vancouver's Westin Bayshore Hotel on 28 March 2009. The only multiple-category winner at that event was The Stills who won New Group of the Year and Alternative Album of the Year (Oceans Will Rise). Kardinal Offishall's single "Dangerous" was awarded Single of the Year, over competition from songs by established major artists such as Michael Bublé, Céline Dion and Nickelback.

=== Primary ceremonies ===
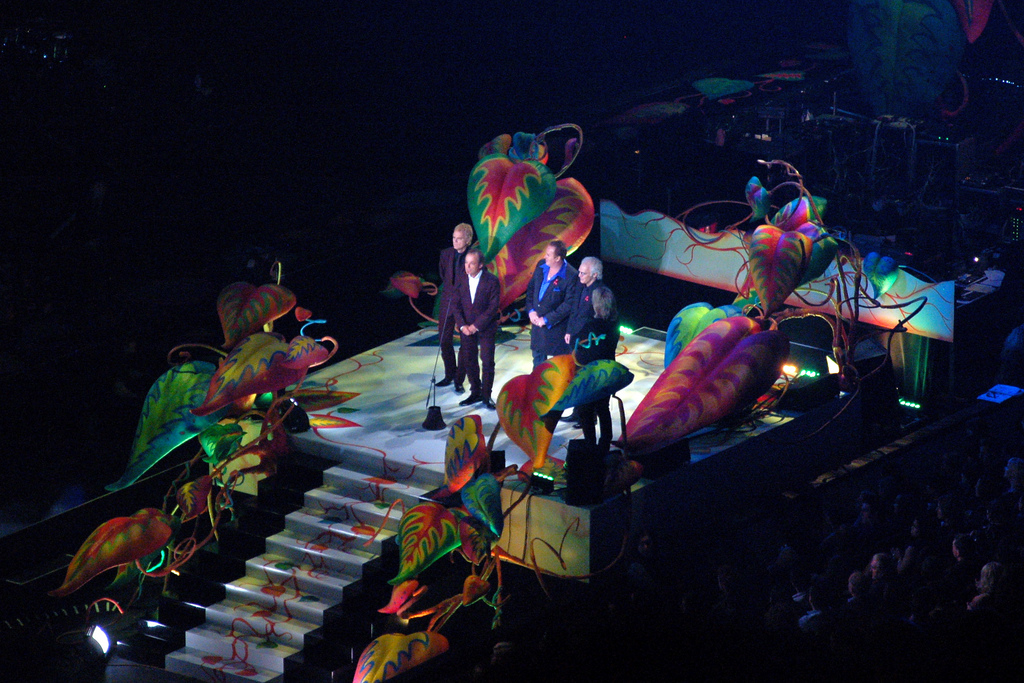
Loverboy, inductees of the Canadian Music Hall of Fame, at the 2009 Juno Awards ceremony

The primary awards ceremony on 29 March 2009 was telecast by CTV from General Motors Place and hosted for the second consecutive year by Russell Peters.

Artists performing at the ceremonies broadcast included City and Colour, Nickelback, Sarah McLachlan and Simple Plan. The complete list of performing artists was:

- Nickelback - "Something in Your Mouth"
- Sam Roberts - "Them Kids"
- Sarah McLachlan - "U Want Me 2"
- The Stills - "Being Here"
- City and Colour with Gord Downie - "Sleeping Sickness"
- Crystal Shawanda - "You Can Let Go"
- Divine Brown - "One More Chance"
- Serena Ryder - "Little Bit Of Red"
- Simple Plan - "Your Love Is a Lie"
- Bryan Adams with Kathleen Edwards - "Walk On By"
- Great Big Sea with Eccodek and Hawksley Workman - "Gallows Pole"

== Nominees and winners ==
The band Nickelback received five Juno Award nominations, the most of any band or individual artist. Celine Dion and Hedley earned nominations in three categories apiece. Performances have also been scheduled from Simple Plan and Alexisonfire vocalist Dallas Green (performing as City and Colour).

Nominees were announced at a press conference on 5 February 2009. Reporters in attendance expressed an uncertain reaction to the announcement, particularly to the number of nominations given to the critically reviled Nickelback.

The following were the 2009 Juno nominees and winners:

=== Artist of the Year ===
Winner: Sam Roberts

Other Nominees:

- Bryan Adams
- City and Colour (Dallas Green)
- k.d. lang
- Serena Ryder

=== Group of the Year ===
Winner: Nickelback

Other Nominees:

- Great Big Sea
- Simple Plan
- Tokyo Police Club
- The Trews

=== New Artist of the Year ===
Winner: Lights

Other Nominees:

- Jessie Farrell
- Crystal Shawanda
- Kreesha Turner
- Nikki Yanofsky

=== New Group of the Year ===
Winner: The Stills

Other nominees:

- Beast
- Cancer Bats
- Crystal Castles
- Plants and Animals

=== Jack Richardson Producer of the Year ===
Winner: Daniel Lanois, "Here Is What Is" and "Not Fighting Anymore" (Daniel Lanois)

Other nominees:

- Stuart Brawley, "Don't Stop Now" and "Falling" (Emmy Rossum)
- David Foster, "A Change Is Gonna Come" (Seal), "Silent Night" (Josh Groban)
- k.d. lang, "I Dream of Spring" and "Coming Home" (k.d. lang)
- Nickelback and Joey Moi (co-producer Mutt Lange), "Gotta Be Somebody" and "Something in Your Mouth" (Nickelback)

=== Recording Engineer of the Year ===
Winner: Kevin Churko, "Disappearing" and "The Big Bang" (Simon Collins)

Other nominees:

- John "Beetle" Bailey, "Lucky" and "If I Were A Bell" (Molly Johnson)
- Mike Fraser, "Rock N' Roll Train" (AC/DC), "Them Kids" (Sam Roberts)
- Joey Moi, "Gotta Be Somebody" and "Never Gonna Be Alone" (Nickelback)
- Randy Staub, "Something in Your Mouth" (Nickelback)

=== Songwriter of the Year ===
Winner: City and Colour, "Waiting...", "Sleeping Sickness", "The Girl"

Other nominees:

- Nathan Ferraro, "Never Again", "Change For You", "Unaware" (The Midway State)
- Hedley, "Old School", "For The Nights I Can't Remember" (with Dave Genn), "Never Too Late" (with Greig Nori) (Hedley)
- Alanis Morissette, "Underneath", "Not As We", "In Praise of the Vulnerable Man" (Alanis Morissette)
- Gordie Sampson, "When I Said I Would" (Whitney Duncan), "Just A Dream" (Carrie Underwood), "Davey Jones" (Gordie Sampson)

=== Fan Choice Award ===
Winner: Nickelback

Other nominees:

- Céline Dion
- Feist
- Hedley
- The Lost Fingers

=== Nominated albums ===
==== Album of the Year ====
Winner: Dark Horse, Nickelback

Other nominees:

- Famous Last Words, Hedley
- Lost in the 80's, The Lost Fingers
- 70’s Volume 2, Sylvain Cossette
- Simple Plan, Simple Plan

==== Aboriginal Recording of the Year ====
Winner: Running for the Drum, Buffy Sainte-Marie

Other nominees:

- Auk/Blood, Tanya Tagaq
- First Law of the Land, Billy Joe Green
- No Lies (album)|No Lies, Tracy Bone
- The World (And Everything In It), Team Rezofficial

==== Adult Alternative Album of the Year ====
Winner: Is It O.K., Serena Ryder

Other nominees:

- Asking for Flowers, Kathleen Edwards
- The Baroness, Sarah Slean
- Between the Beautifuls, Hawksley Workman
- Exit Strategy of the Soul, Ron Sexsmith

==== Alternative Album of the Year ====
Winner: Oceans Will Rise, The Stills

Other nominees:

- The Chemistry of Common Life, Fucked Up
- In the Future, Black Mountain
- Parc Avenue, Plants and Animals
- Soft Airplane, Chad VanGaalen

==== Blues Album of the Year ====
Winner: Ramblin' Son, Julian Fauth

Other nominees:

- Acoustic Blues: Got 'Em from the Bottom, Big Dave McLean
- Get Way Back: A Tribute to Percy Mayfield, Amos Garrett
- Love & Sound, Garrett Mason
- Mess of Blues, Jeff Healey

==== CD/DVD Artwork Design of the Year ====
Winner: Anouk Pennel and Stéphane Poirer, En concert dans la forêt des mal-aimés avec l'Orchestre Métropolitain, Pierre Lapointe

Other nominees:

- John Cook, Kelly Ferguson, John James Audubon, Koko Bonaparte, Sugarbird, Paul Reddick
- Phoebe Greenberg, George Fok, Daniel Fortin, Leda & St. Jacques, Productions l'Éloi, Pulse of the Planet, Slim Williams
- Mark Sasso, Casey Laforet, Mountain Meadows, Elliott Brood
- Dallas Wehrle, Robyn Kotyk, Alex vs. Alex, Kensington Heights, Constantines

==== Children's Album of the Year ====
Winner: Snacktime!, Barenaked Ladies

Other nominees:

- Catchy Tune, Jack Grunsky
- FiddleFire!, Chris McKhool
- The Kerplunks, The Kerplunks
- Oui!, Gregg LeRock

==== Contemporary Christian/Gospel Album of the Year ====
Winner: Ending Is Beginning, Downhere

Other nominees:

- Colors and Sounds, Article One
- I Will Go, Starfield
- Roar of Heaven, Life Support
- Salvation Station, newworldson

==== Classical Album of the Year (large ensemble) ====
Winner: Beethoven: Ideals Of The French Revolution, Montreal Symphony Orchestra and Kent Nagano

Other nominees:

- Bach: Métamorphoses, Orchestre symphonique de Québec and Yoav Talmi
- Beethoven: Symphonies Nos. 7 & 8, Tafelmusik and Bruno Weil
- Bruckner: Symphonie No 9, Orchestre Métropolitain and Yannick Nézet-Séguin
- Haydn: Symphonies 62, 107 & 108, Toronto Chamber Orchestra and Kevin Mallon

==== Classical Album of the Year (solo or chamber ensemble) ====
Winner: Homage, James Ehnes

Other nominees:

- Haydn: Six Sonatas for Piano, Anton Kuerti
- Schubert: Complete Piano Trios, The Gryphon Trio
- Schumann: Sonata in F#Minor & Humoreske, Angela Hewitt
- Shostakovich: 24 Preludes & Fugues opus 87, David Jalbert

==== Classical Album of the Year (vocal or choral performance) ====
Winner: Gloria! Vivaldi's Angels, Ensemble Caprice

Other nominees:

- Bach and the Liturgical Year, Shannon Mercer and Luc Beauséjour
- Handel: Arias, Karina Gauvin
- Schumann: Dichterliebe & other Heine Settings, Gerald Finley
- The Voice of Bach, Daniel Taylor

==== Francophone Album of the Year ====
Winner: Tous les sens, Ariane Moffatt

Other nominees:

- L'arbre aux parfums, Caracol
- Cœur de pirate, Cœur de pirate
- Tradarnac, Swing
- Le volume du vent, Karkwa

==== Instrumental Album of the Year ====
Winner: Nostomania, DJ Brace presents The Electric Nosehair Orchestra

Other nominees:

- Auk/Blood, Tanya Tagaq
- The Furniture Moves Underneath, Inhabitants
- The Soundtrack, Creaking Tree String Quartet
- Telescope, Steve Dawson

==== International Album of the Year ====
Winner: Viva La Vida, Coldplay

Other nominees:

- Black Ice, AC/DC
- Chinese Democracy, Guns N' Roses
- Death Magnetic, Metallica
- Sleep Through the Static, Jack Johnson

==== Contemporary Jazz Album of the Year ====
Winner: Embracing Voices, Jane Bunnett

Other nominees:

- A Bend in the River, Roberto Occhipinti
- Existential Detective, Barry Romberg's Random Access Large Ensemble
- Rasstones, François Bourassa Quartet
- The Sicilian Jazz Project, Michael Occhipinti

==== Traditional Jazz Album of the Year ====
Winner: Second Time Around, Oliver Jones

Other nominees:

- For Kenny Wheeler, Don Thompson Quartet
- Small Wonder, Brad Turner Quartet
- Solo, Chris Donnelly
- TV Trio, John Stetch

==== Vocal Jazz Album of the Year ====
Winner: Lucky, Molly Johnson

Other nominees:

- Ella...Of Thee I Swing, Nikki Yanofsky
- If the Moon Turns Green..., Diana Panton
- Ima, Yvette Tollar
- Parkdale, Elizabeth Shepherd

==== Pop Album of the Year ====
Winner: Flavors of Entanglement, Alanis Morissette

Other nominees:

- Holes, The Midway State
- No Sleep at All, Creature
- Passion, Kreesha Turner
- Wake Up and Say Goodbye, David Usher

==== Rock Album of the Year ====
Winner: Love at the End of the World, Sam Roberts

Other nominees:

- Fortress, Protest The Hero
- No Time for Later, The Trews
- Parallel Play, Sloan
- Terminal Romance, Matt Mays & El Torpedo

==== Roots and Traditional Album of the Year (Solo) ====
Winner: Proof of Love, Old Man Luedecke

Other nominees:

- The Contradictor, Ndidi Onukwulu
- Ghost Notes, Matthew Barber
- Happy Here, Suzie Vinnick
- Tinderbox, Fred Eaglesmith

==== Roots and Traditional Album of the Year (Group) ====
Winner: Chic Gamine, Chic Gamine

Other nominees:

- Fast Paced World, The Duhks
- Highway Prayer, Twilight Hotel
- Mountain Meadows, Elliott Brood
- XOK, NQ Arbuckle

==== World Music Album of the Year ====
Winner: Africa to Appalachia, Jayme Stone and Mansa Sissoko

Other nominees:

- The Art of the Early Egyptian Qanun, George Dimitri Sawa
- Cairo to Toronto, Maryem & Ernie Tollar
- Contrabanda, Lubo and Kaba Horo
- Shivaboom, Eccodek

=== Nominated releases ===
==== Single of the Year ====
Winner: "Dangerous", Kardinal Offishall

Other nominees:

- "Gotta Be Somebody", Nickelback
- "Lay It on the Line", Divine Brown
- "Lost", Michael Bublé
- "Taking Chances", Céline Dion

==== Classical Composition of the Year ====
Winner: "Flanders Fields Reflections", John Burge

Other nominees:

- "From the Dark Reaches", T. Patrick Carrabré
- "Manhattan Music", Bramwell Tovey
- "Notes Towards A Poem That Can Never Be Written", Timothy Corlis
- "Song of Songs", Sid Robinovitch

==== Country Recording of the Year ====
Winner: Beautiful Life, Doc Walker

Other nominees:

- Chasing the Sun, Tara Oram
- Dawn of a New Day, Crystal Shawanda
- Thankful, Aaron Pritchett
- What I Do, George Canyon

==== Dance Recording of the Year ====
Winner: "Random Album Title", Deadmau5

Other nominees:

- "Everything's Gonna Be Alright", James Doman
- "Get Blahsted", Hatiras and MC Flipside
- "Move For Me", Deadmau5 vs. Kaskade
- "Yes We Can", House Music United

==== Music DVD of the Year ====
Winner: Blue Road (Blue Rodeo)

Other nominees:

- Here Is What Is (Daniel Lanois)
- It All Started With A Red Stripe (Moneen)
- Live in Las Vegas - A New Day... (Céline Dion)
- A MultiMedia Life (Buffy Sainte-Marie)

==== R&B/Soul Recording of the Year ====
Winner: The Love Chronicles, Divine Brown

Other nominees:

- Elise Estrada, Elise Estrada
- Money, Zaki Ibrahim
- The Promise, Deborah Cox
- TONY, Ivana Santilli

==== Rap Recording of the Year ====
Winner: Not 4 Sale, Kardinal Offishall

Other Nominees:

- A Captured Moment in Time, DL Incognito
- The Book, D-Sisive
- I Rap Now, Famous
- Point Blank, Point Blank

==== Reggae Recording of the Year ====
Winner: "Everything", Humble

Other nominees:

- "Jah Lift Me Up", Blessed
- "Renegade Rocker", Dubmatix
- "The Peacemaker's Chauffeur", Jason Wilson
- "Truth Will Reveal", Souljah Fyah

=== Video of the Year ===
Winner: Anthony Seck, "Honey Honey" (Feist)

Other nominees:

- Davin Black, "Blond Kryptonite" (Saint Alvia)
- Wendy Morgan, "Going On" (Gnarls Barkley)
- Dave Pawsey, "Detroit '67" (Sam Roberts)
- Dave Pawsey, "Them Kids" (Sam Roberts)

== Compilation CD ==
A compilation album for the awards was released in March 2009
