= Downhere (disambiguation) =

downhere is a Christian rock band.

Downhere may also refer to:

- Downhere (1999 album), a 1999 album by Downhere
- Downhere (2001 album), a rerecorded version of the 1999 album

== See also ==
- Down Here, an album by Tracy Bonham
