= KBUU =

KBUU may refer to:

- KBUU-LP, a low-power radio station (99.1 FM) licensed to serve Malibu, California, United States
- Burlington Municipal Airport (Wisconsin) (ICAO code KBUU)
