= Fahrenheit 43 =

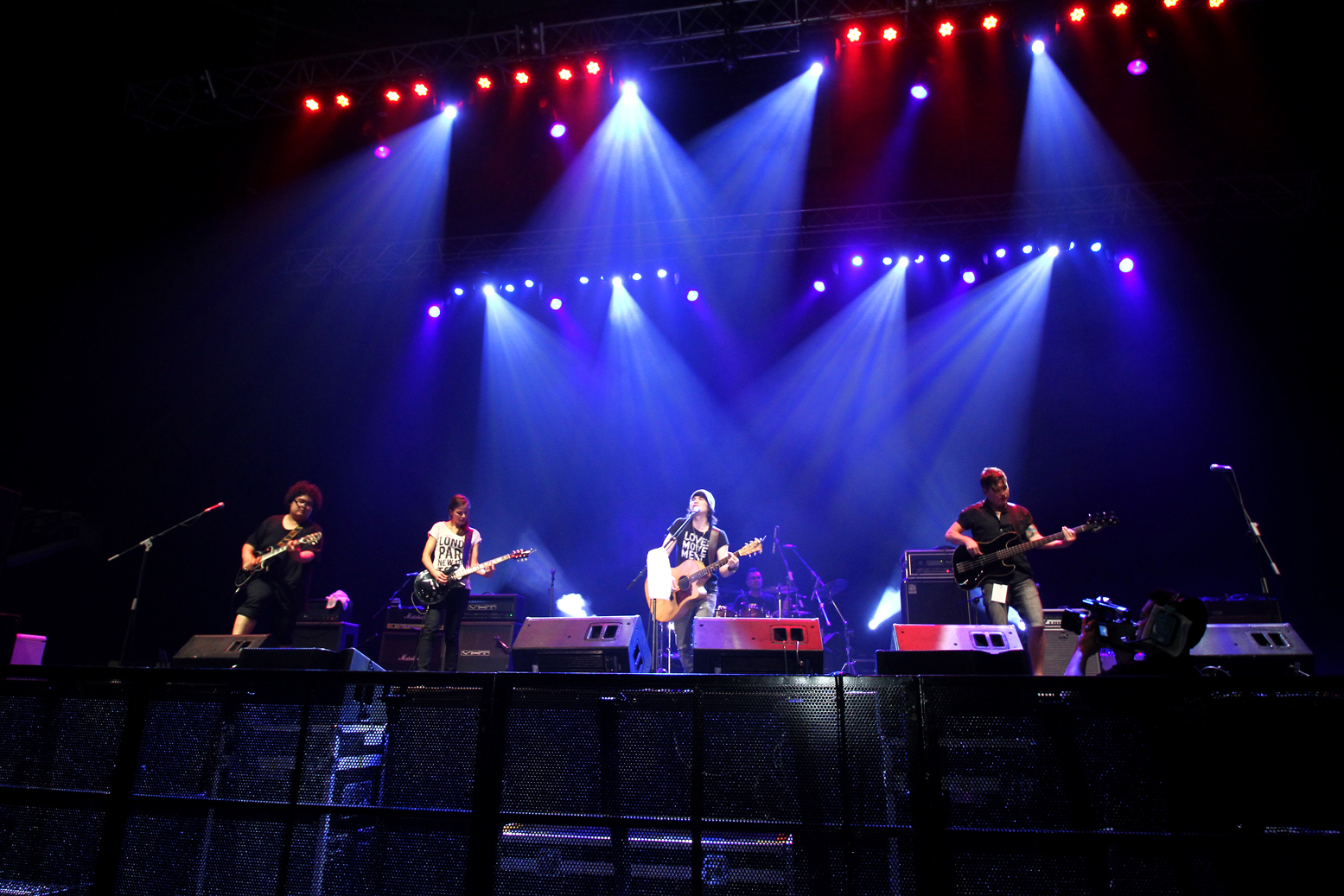
- Fahrenheit 43 performing onstage at Araneta Coliseum in November, 2010

Background information
- Origin: Melbourne, Victoria, Australia
- Genres: Rock, pop rock
- Years active: 2008–present
- Members: Richard James Long; Alwin Laysico; Grant Young; Christian Lagumay

Fahrenheit 43 are an Australian pop rock band from Melbourne.

== History ==
Formed in 2008, after lead singer Richard met guitarist Gemma by chance. The two began performing as an acoustic duo, and in 2009 were chosen by event organisers to showcase at the L'Oreal Melbourne Fashion Festival. Drummer Alwin Laysico joined the band soon after, bringing with him bass player Grant Young. In 2010, Laysico brought on board family friend, and talented young guitarist, Christian Lagumay.

Fahrenheit 43 launched their debut EP, 'The 6 Degrees EP', on 22 October 2009 at The Curtin Bandroom on Lygon Street in Melbourne. Fahrenheit 43's independent release has been called 'the best EP of the year' (Dave Griffiths, Buzz Magazine), with one review heralding the band as 'one of the best pop-rock groups to surface in a long, long time'.

Fahrenheit 43's first big break came in March 2010 when they were announced as the winner of the Victorian public vote in Nova Radio's national 'I Am With The Band' Competition. The band won a coveted spot to play at Nova 100's 'I Am With The Band' LIVE in Melbourne show, held at The Espy's infamous Gershwin Room.

On 19 August 2010 - World Humanitarian Day- Fahrenheit 43 released a track free to download, an exclusive demo of their world anthem, The Reason. The band's desire to make a difference through their music, garnered the attention and support of organisations such as World Vision and Oxfam, with the latter subsequently inviting F43 to perform The Reason at the Make Poverty History Electoral Forum in Melbourne. Halfway around the world, The Reason was also making waves in North America, attracting the attention of the United Nations and the Sérgio Vieira de Mello Foundation – a foundation working alongside the UN and dedicated to current human rights issues, who have since posted 'The Reason' to their international website.

In September 2010, Fahrenheit 43 took the stage at the Royal Melbourne Show alongside internationally renowned acts Operator Please & Kisschasy.

In November 2010, Fahrenheit 43 toured the Philippines. The band played eight headline dates, as well as two sold-out shows with supporting American rock band, the Gin Blossoms. In Manila, Fahrenheit 43 opened the show to a crowd of 18,000 at Araneta Coliseum. In Cebu, Fahrenheit 43 also shared the stage with Filipino superband Sandwich. Whilst on tour, Fahrenheit 43 made a special appearance on Music Uplate Live, ABS-CBN's popular late night music program. F43 were also featured around this time on Channel 31’s Pinoy Lounge program.

Back home in Australia in 2011, Fahrenheit 43 appeared at several major music festivals, including Easterfest in Toowoomba where they performed at Queens Park alongside major international artists such as Switchfoot, Paul Coleman Trio, and Article One. For their Easterfest City performance, Fahrenheit 43 shared the stage with American band The Classic Crime and Aussie artist Michael Paynter.

== Artistry ==
Fahrenheit 43 have described their early music as being "Alternative Pop Rock", with songwriting influences coming from John Mayer, The Eagles and the Goo Goo Dolls. From these solid musical roots, the band's sound has evolved into a more alternative rock style since the release of their debut EP in 2009. Citing bands such as Paramore, Anberlin and The Dangerous Summer, as heavy influences on their current creative direction, Fahrenheit 43's live show has been the first to reveal the evolution, ahead of the release of their forthcoming debut long play. Lead singer and principle songwriter Richard James has also said during an interview in November 2010, that although he still writes the lyrics and initial music, each band member brings their own element to the song and shapes it into something bigger.

== Members ==
=== Current members ===
- Richard James Long– lead vocals, acoustic, keys (2008–present)
- Grant Young – bass, vocals (2010–present)
- Christian 'Ian' Lagumay – lead guitar, vocals (2010–present)
- Alwin 'Elmo' Laysico – drums (2009–present)

=== Former members ===
- James 'Pudding' Karagiozis; guitars (2011–2012)
- Gemma May Alpert – rhythm guitar, keys, vocals, (2008–2011)
- Alfie Lagos – bass (2009–2010)

== Discography ==
The 6 Degrees EP

EP by Fahrenheit 43
- Released: 22 October 2009
- Genres: Acoustic rock, pop rock
- Length: 18:53

- The 6 Degrees EP (2009)
  1. "Angel's Lullaby" – 3:21
  2. "Rescue Me" – 4:34
  3. "The Reason" (acoustic) – 2:33
  4. "25 Down" (acoustic) – 5:29
  5. "Dreams In Motion" (interlude) – 1:56
- Underneath The Overturned (2012) - November 2012
  1. "Wake Up" (Intro) - 0:45
  2. "Get Out" - 3:49
  3. "Gotta Find" - 3:39
  4. "Kaleidoscope" - 5:08
  5. "Freedom For The Fallen" - 3:56
  6. "The Lost Generation" (INTERLUDE) - 1:45
  7. "Eyewitness" - 4:52
  8. "We Are Waiting" - 4:49
  9. "I Love Thee" - 0:50
  10. "Fairytales & Greyscales" - 3:32
  11. "Remember" - 3:45
  12. "Love Is The Movement" - 4:28
  13. "The Reason" - 5:14
