= Cicėnas =

- Lithuanian surname
- m.: Cicėnas
- f.: (unmarried): Cicėnaitė
- f.: (married): Cicėnienė

Cicėnas is a Lithuanian surname

- Jeronimas Cicėnas (1909–1987), Lithuanian and American journalist, writer, and public figure
- Jurgis Cicėnas, drummer of Lithuanian rock band Sweetsalt
- Kęstutis Cicėnas (born 10 October 1993) is a Lithuanian theatre, film and television actor
- Ramūnas Cicėnas (born 1980), Lithuanian theater, film and television actor, and director
