= Love & the Lack Thereof =

Studio album by Greg Sczebel
- Released: October 13, 2009
- Recorded: The Warehouse Studio and Armoury Studios, Vancouver, British Columbia, Canada; Soultone Studio, Salmon Arm, British Columbia, Canada, et al
- Genre: Contemporary Christian music
- Length: 1:01:55
- Label: Soultone Records
- Producer: Greg Sczebel; Jerry Sczebel

Greg Sczebel chronology
Here to Stay (2004)	Love & the Lack Thereof (2009)

Professional ratings
Review scores
Source	Rating
NewReleaseTuesday	(favourable)

Love & the Lack Thereof is the second album by Greg Sczebel. The album won the Juno Award for Contemporary Christian/Gospel Album of the Year at the Juno Awards of 2011. Love & the Lack Thereof also won for Pop/Contemporary Album of the Year at the 2010 32nd annual GMA Canada Covenant Awards. The song "Homeland" was the 2007 Grand Prize Winner, Session II, in the Gospel Category of the John Lennon Songwriting Contest. "Homeland" also placed third in the Gospel/Christian Music category of the 2007 International Songwriting Competition (ISC).

== Track listing ==
1. "One by One" - 5:15
2. "Stop You've Only Got One Heart" - 4:01
3. "Causin' a Commotion" - 3:43
4. "How am I Supposed to Breathe" - 3:45
5. "Ain't Got Love" - 4:01
6. "I Will Come" - 4:38
7. "I've Got That Feelin'" - 3:58
8. "Peace" - 5:26
9. "Every Word You Say" - 3:46
10. "The Flow" - 4:08
11. "This is Worth Fighting For" - 5:09
12. "Homeland" - 4:19
13. "Cancelling the Noise" - 9:46

Words and music by Greg Sczebel.
