= Tara Oram =

Canadian musician (born 1984)

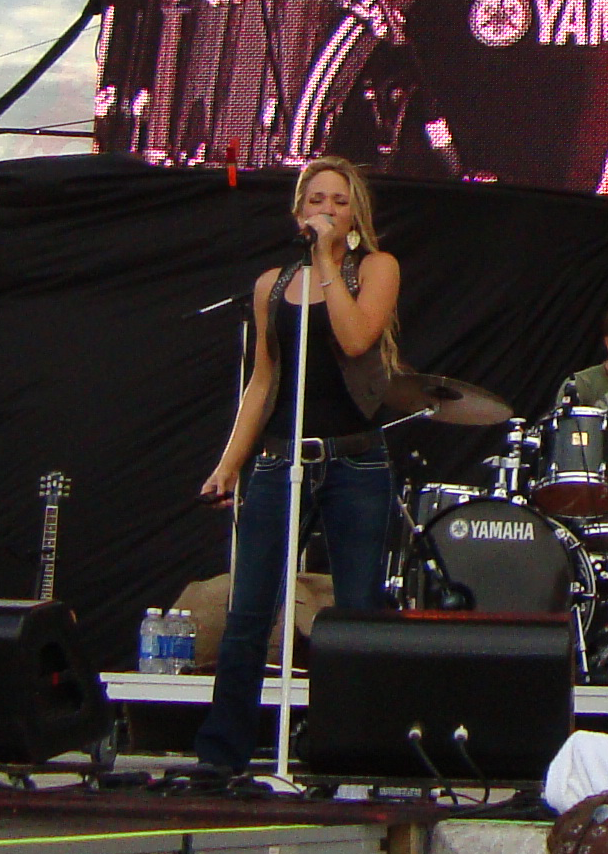
- Performing at the 2010 Cavendish Beach Music Festival in Prince Edward Island, Canada.

Background information
- Born: Tara Oram; April 28, 1984 (age 42)
- Origin: Hare Bay, Newfoundland
- Genres: Country
- Occupations: Singer; television personality
- Instruments: Vocals, guitar
- Years active: 2003 – present
- Label: Open Road

Tara Oram (born April 28, 1984) is a Canadian country music recording artist and TV personality. She was a top six finalist on the fifth season of Canadian Idol in 2007. In 2009, Oram received the "Rising Star" Canadian Country Music Award and was nominated for a Juno Award, for Country Album of the Year, for her debut album Chasing the Sun.

== Early life ==
Oram was born in Hare Bay, Newfoundland but moved frequently during her early years. Oram first moved to the Malton area of Mississauga, Ontario when she was 10 years old, and later to Brampton, where she attended Bramalea Secondary School.

== Career ==
At age 16 Oram was signed to indie label Wellcraft Music Group and released her first country music single called, "More Than I Dreamed" which was her first top 50 hit. She later toured with a local agency called Performerz, which allowed her to sing in theatres, malls and festivals throughout Ontario. When 19 Oram joined her first real band, Big Catch. The band played the bar/club circuit and corporate events around Ontario for the better part of four years, performing a mix of country, top 40, rock, R'n B and retro. In 2007, Oram auditioned for the hit show Canadian Idol, earning a 6th-place finish on the hit reality show. The next year, Oram signed her first major record deal with Open Road/Universal Music Canada and also appeared on reality TV series called, "The Tara Diaries" on CMT. CMT filmed a Christmas special she hosted, "The Night Before Christmas". In October 2008, Oram's first show as a signed artist was opening for her Idol, Marty Stuart in Halifax, Nova Scotia.

In 2009, CMT and YTV Oram appeared a celebrity judge on the TV series, "Karaoke Star Junior".

On July 10, 2010, Oram was the opening act for Taylor Swift and performed at the second annual Cavendish Beach Music Festival in Cavendish, Prince Edward Island, singing to a crowd of more than 35,000 people.

Oram became a judge on YTV's Canadian reality TV show, The Next Star since Season 5, which premiered July 18, 2012.

=== Awards and nominations ===
Oram received nominations for the 2009 East Coast Music Awards in the categories Female Solo Recording of the Year and Video of the Year, and won in the Country Recording of the Year award. She also received a CRMA (Canadian Radio Music Award) nomination as Best New Group/Solo Artist. On February 2, 2009 Oram was nominated for a Juno Award in the Country Recording of the Year category. Oram won the 2009 CCMA Rising Star award. She was also nominated for Rising Star, Female Artist of the Year and Video of the Year.

In 2015, Tara Oram received a Star on Brampton's Walk of Fame.

== Discography ==
=== Albums ===
Title	Details
Chasing the Sun	Release date: October 7, 2008; Label: Open Road Recordings
Revival	Release date: July 19, 2011; Label: Open Road Recordings

=== Singles ===
Year	Single	Peak positions	Album
Year	Single	CAN	Album
2008	"Fly Girl"	77	Chasing the Sun
2008	"538 Stars"	98	Chasing the Sun
2009	"Go to Bed Angry"	—	Chasing the Sun
2009	"Living the Dream"	—	Chasing the Sun
2011	"1929"	—	Revival
2011	"Kiss Me When I Fall"	—	Revival

=== Music videos ===
Year	Video	Director
2008	"Fly Girl"	Stephen Scott
2008	"538 Stars"	Stephen Scott
2009	"Go to Bed Angry"	Warren P. Sonoda
2011	"1929"	Margaret Malandruccolo

== Awards and nominations ==
Year	Association	Category	Result
2009	Juno Awards of 2009	Country Recording of the Year – Chasing the Sun	Nominated
2009	Canadian Country Music Association	Female Artist of the Year	Nominated
2009	Canadian Country Music Association	Rising Star	Won
2009	Canadian Country Music Association	CMT Video of the Year – "Go to Bed Angry"	Nominated
2011	Canadian Country Music Association	Female Artist of the Year	Nominated
2012	Canadian Country Music Association	Female Artist of the Year	Nominated

== See also ==
- Canadian Idol
- Season 5 Recap of Canadian Idol
