= Here to Stay (Greg Sczebel album) =

Studio album by Greg Sczebel
- Released: June 1, 2004
- Genre: Contemporary Christian music
- Length: 38:45
- Producer: Greg Sczebel; Jerry Sczebel

Greg Sczebel chronology
Here to Stay (2004)	Love & the Lack Thereof (2009)

Professional ratings
Review scores
Source	Rating
Cross Rhythms	8/10 stars
Soul Shine Magazine	5/5 stars

Here to Stay is the debut album by Greg Sczebel. The album won the Juno Award for Contemporary Christian/Gospel Album of the Year at the Juno Awards of 2005. Here to Stay also won two Shai Awards in 2005, for Contemporary/Pop Album of the Year, and Urban/Soul Album of the Year. In addition the album won the Outstanding Christian Recording award at the 2005 Western Canadian Music Awards.

The Shai 2005 Song of the Year award went to "In the Pocket". The song "Here to Stay" was also the 2004 Grand Prize Winner, Gospel Category in the John Lennon Songwriting Contest, while "You've Got It" was 2005 Finalist, Session I, in the R&B Category. "In The Pocket" was a finalist in the Gospel/Christian Music category of the 2005 International Songwriting Competition (ISC). The song "Lights Are Comin' On" was awarded Rap/Hip Hop/Dance Song of the Year at the 2004 GMA Canada Covenant Awards. "Everybody" was awarded Urban Song of the Year at the 2005 GMA Canada Covenant Awards.

== Track listing ==
1. "Here to Stay" - 4:03
2. "In the Pocket" - 4:06
3. "Lights are Comin' On" - 3:08
4. "Perhaps" - 4:04
5. "Still the One" - 4:07
6. "You've Got It" - 3:44
7. "Everybody" - 2:28
8. "Satisfy" - 2:25
9. "You've Got It (Reprise)" - 1:58
10. "Unlisted" - 4:21
11. "Thank You" - 4:21

Words by Greg Sczebel, except "Thank You" by Greg and Jerry Sczebel.
