= Allen Froese =

Allen Froese is a Canadian contemporary Christian singer and songwriter. He is most noted for his 2019 EP All Things New, which was a Juno Award nominee for Contemporary Christian/Gospel Album of the Year at the Juno Awards of 2021.

He previously released the album Faith Inside in 2007, and the EP We Won't Stop in 2015.
