= Shawna Cain =

Christian music performer from Canada

Shawna Cain is a Canadian performer of Christian music from Brampton, Ontario, whose 2020 EP The Way won the Juno Award for Contemporary Christian/Gospel Album of the Year at the Juno Awards of 2021.

Her style blends Christian music themes with contemporary rhythm and blues and hip hop influences.
