= KBUU-LP =

- Malibu, California; United States
- Broadcast area: Malibu, California
- Frequency: 99.1 MHz (HD Radio)
- Branding: 99.1 KBUU

Programming
- Format: Modern rock (daytime); Community radio (nighttime)
- Subchannels: HD2: The Mighty 690 (News/talk); HD3: J1 HD (J-Pop)
- Affiliations: Pacifica Radio

Ownership
- Owner: Zuma Beach FM Emergency and Community Broadcasters

History
- First air date: January 2015
- Former frequencies: 97.5 MHz (2015–2017)

Technical information
- Licensing authority: FCC
- Facility ID: 195574
- Class: L1
- ERP: 71 watts
- HAAT: 36 meters
- Transmitter coordinates: 34°2′26.1″N 118°47′19.7″W

Links
- Public license information: LMS
- Webcast: Listen Live; Listen Live (HD3)
- Website: radiomalibu.net j1fm.tokyo (HD3)

KBUU-LP (99.1 FM) is a radio station broadcasting in Malibu, California. It transmits a modern rock format during the daytime, and community disc jockeys play their choices of music in the evenings. Licensed by the Federal Communications Commission as a low-power FM radio station, it went on-air on February 26, 2015. The station calls itself 99.1 KBU and uses the slogan "On The Air, On The Web, On The Beach."

KBUU began transmitting on HD-1 and HD-2 on Feb. 23, 2021. HD-3 operations began shortly after. The station also announced plans to transmit on HD-3 and HD-4.

KBUU-LP was granted two construction permits on August 26, 2018, to further improve its signal in the Malibu area.

On March 22, 2022, the station began operating KBUU-FM2-LP from a transmitter at Zuma Beach. The 20-watt "booster" station is also on the same 99.1 MHz frequency, and it fills in areas to the west of the main transmitter's coverage area that is within the station's authorized 60 db/meter contour but that is blocked by terrain. KBUU-FM2 is licensed to Zuma Beach and is being constructed to increase signal coverage west of Trancas Beach. KBUU and KBUU-FM2 are synchronized using GatesAir FMXi.4g and Intraplex 100 units, so the booster and main frequency overlap.

Station KBUU-FM1 is licensed to Malibu Beach and is being constructed to increase signal coverage in eastern Malibu, the Civic Center, and central Malibu areas. It will operate with an effective radiated power of 20 watts analog with directional antennas pointing east and west.

Exhibits filed with the FCC show that the two boosters will increase city-grade coverage to nearly the entire length of Malibu, from Big Rock to County Line Beach.

Volunteer community programmers at KBUU-LP produce 40 hours of local music programs per week, including "Miles of Styles" Latin Jazz with Erin Laetz, "Bix Mix - jazz and way beyond with Bill Bixler, "Big Rocks with Caryn Weiss," engineered by Brandi Jackson, "Malibu Trails Americana," "The KBU Collective" with Elena Corral, "Off The Lip with Sandy Bottoms," "Come Together With Brooke Halpin and the Beatles," "The Rock Show" with Laura Espinosa, "Just Another Dennis Sunday" and "The Menace's Attic" with Dennis Scheyer, and "Harvesting Happiness, straight talk from engaging guests with Lisa Cypers Kamen."

It carries Democracy Now! from Pacifica Radio on weekdays from 5-6am and repeated 6-7am. It carries The World from PRX daily from 4-5pm and repeated from 5-6pm.

KBUU produces a local all-news morning drive program block each weekday, from 7 am to 9:30am. This includes 15-minute local newscasts produced and originated at KBUU, world news from FSN/Feature Service News, and "The California Report," a daily newscast from KQED-FM in San Francisco. It carries "The California Report Weekend Magazine", Pulse of the Planet, Le Show with Harry Shearer, and the weekly broadcast meeting of the Commonwealth Club of California. Additionally, KBUU-LP carries the following syndicated programs: the Los Angeles Philharmonic Orchestra weekly concert from Disney Hall, "The American Parlor Series" with JP Houston and Julie Van Dusen, and "eTown."

KBUU-LP is licensed to Zuma Beach FM Emergency and Community Broadcasters, a committee of Malibu residents, along with station manager Hans Laetz, oversees the station's operations. The programming is broadcast directly from Laetz's home. KBUU-LP is one of the few radio stations in the United States to be licensed to operate with its main studio in a private home (legal in the City of Malibu zoning code, see Malibu Municipal Code Sec. 19, B, Sec. ii Its 20 volunteer hosts or program sources all feed their shows to the studio for broadcast.

KBUU-LP transmits with 71 watts of effective radiated power on 99.1 MHz as authorized by the Federal Communications Commission in Washington D.C.

KBUU-LP was granted a construction permit on November 13, 2017, to improve its signal in the Malibu area. In December 2017, the station moved its transmission frequency to 99.1 MHz increased its power from 55 to 71 watts, and re-oriented a directional antenna towards the Civic Center, instead of out to sea to the south. The station was issued a license to cover 99.1 FM on December 20, 2017.

KBUU-LP is licensed to a committee of Malibu residents incorporated as a California not-for-profit public educational corporation known as Zuma Beach FM Community and Educational Broadcasters. It is found by the Internal Revenue Service to be a 501(c) organization, underwriting donations may be tax deductible under section 501 (c) 3 of the Internal Revenue Code (consult tax advisor). There are no paid employees.

KBU2 streams at www.kbu2.net. It plays continuous surf reports and surf music from 7-10 a.m., followed by that day's edition of "Malibu's Only Local Daily News" repeating 10 am-2 pm on a loop. Replays of the previous night's volunteer shows and then modern rock follow.

In 2021, KBUU-LP began testing HD Radio.

== Former logos ==
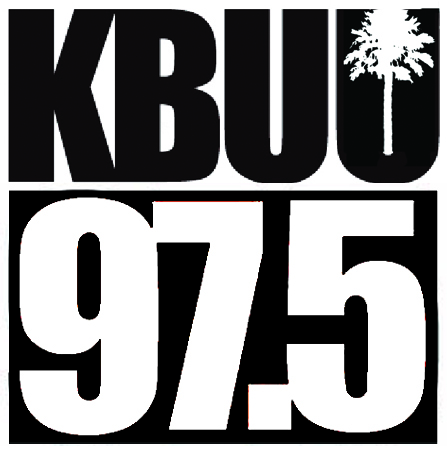

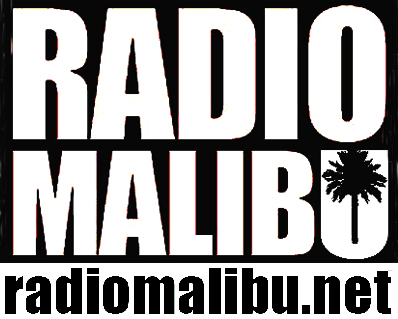

== See also ==
- List of community radio stations in the United States
