= Thunder After Lightning (The Uncut Demos) =

Studio album by downhere
- Released: July 2007
- Genre: Christian rock/Modern Rock
- Length: 60:14
- Label: Centricity Music
- Producer: downhere

Downhere chronology
Wide-Eyed And Simplified (2007)	Thunder After Lightning (The Uncut Demos) (2007)	Thank You For Coming (The Live Bootlegs) (2008)

Professional ratings
Review scores
Source	Rating
Christianity Today	link

Thunder After Lightning (The Uncut Demos) is the second intermediate album release from Christian rock band Downhere. This album is composed of fourteen "demos" which were considered for the potential inclusion on their previous release Wide-Eyed and Mystified. The CD also contains three song demos that were studio recorded and released on Wide-Eyed and Mystified; "1000 Miles Apart", "A Better Way", and "Jesus, Ellipsis". The latter developed into the song now entitled "The Real Jesus".

== Track listing ==
1. "Close to Midnight" – 3:52
2. "I'm All About You" – 3:52
3. "I Can't Lose Forever" – 4:00
4. "Find Me" – 2:29
5. "Not About Wings" – 4:00
6. "Thunder After Lightning" – 3:13
7. "15" – 4:02
8. "The Invitation" – 3:40
9. "Whatever Happens" – 2:21
10. "Story In The Making" – 3:58
11. "Don't Be So" – 3:42
12. "Sing This Song" – 0:57
13. "Someone" – 4:18
14. "Closer to Me" – 3:32
15. "Jesus, Ellipsis" – 4:34
16. "1000 Miles Apart" – 3:22
17. "A Better Way" – 4:22
