= Roots Revolution =

Studio album by Newworldson
- Released: 2006
- Genre: CCM
- Length: 46 minutes
- Label: Orange Cross
- Producer: Newworldson and the Almighty

Newworldson chronology
| Roots Revolution (2006) | Salvation Station EP (2007) |

Roots Revolution is the independent-label debut album from Canadian CCM band Newworldson. The album won the 2007 Gospel Music Association Canada Covenant Award for Folk/Roots Album Of The Year. The accompanying DVD received a 2007 GMAC nomination for DVD Of The Year. Roots Revolution was also nominated as the Contemporary Christian/Gospel Album Of The Year at the Juno Awards of 2008.

The lyrics and music were written by Joel Parisien. Three tracks from Roots Revolution also appear on their hit album Salvation Station: "Down From The Mountain", "Babylon Is Gonna Fall" and "Empty Heart".

== Track listing ==
1. "Down From The Mountain"
2. "Weary"
3. "Standing On The Rock"
4. "Wash Me Clean"
5. "Babylon Is Gonna Fall"
6. "And So On"
7. "Butterflies"
8. "Empty Heart"
9. "We Are Forgiven"
10. "Sweet Soul Music"
11. "Calling All Saints"

== Bonus DVD ==
- produced and directed by Mike Enns
1. "Behind The Revolution"
2. "Pass Me Not" (live)
3. "This Train Is Bound For Glory" (live)
4. "Lounging With Divinity" (live)
5. "Weary" (studio)
6. "And So On" (studio)
7. "Sweet Soul Music" (studio)

== Personnel ==
- Josh Toal - guitar, vocals, cabasa
- Mark Rogers - drums, percussion
- Rich Moore - upright bass
- Joel Parisien - organ, piano, melodica, vibes, percussion, vocals
- Roger Martin - pedal steel
- Darryl Dixon - alto sax
- Dave Watson - tenor and baritone saxes
