= Creature (band) =

Canadian band

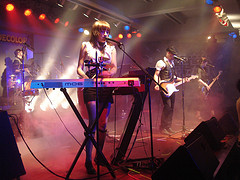
- Creature in China

Background information
- Origin: Montreal, Quebec, Canada
- Genres: Indie pop, pop rock, dance-punk
- Years active: 2004 – present
- Labels: Bonsound Records; Universal Music Canada; Universal Music France
- Members: Kim Ho; Lisa Ivy; Sid-Z; Meli Mae
- Past members: Gina Simmons; Anastasia Culurides
- Website: creatureband.com (defunct)

Creature is a Canadian pop rock band, formed in 2004 in Montreal.

== History ==
The band formed in 2004 under the name "Pawel Czuraj" and released a debut album No Sleep At All on March 3, 2008. The following year, No Sleep At All became a nominee in the "Pop Album of The Year" category at the Juno Awards of 2009.

The band's sound incorporates elements of hip hop, dance-punk and new wave music. All the band's members contribute vocals to the music, which adds to the constant boy-girl dialogue in the songs.

In 2005, Creature opened for Our Lady Peace in Montreal at La Tulipe and has also opened for Mika at the Bell Centre.

Creature also performed at Pop Montreal (2005, 2006, 2007), South by Southwest (SXSW) in 2007 and in 2008, taking part in the M for Montreal showcase and at Les Transmusicales de Rennes in France.

In 2009, the band was invited to perform at the Montreal Jazz Festival, the Transmit Live showcase in Vancouver, the Transmit China showcase, they also played the El Evento 40 event at Estadio Azteca, a showcase presented by Los 40 principales and the FMTU Monterrey Music Festival both in Mexico and in France they performed at the Solidays festival. In August No Sleep At All was released in Mexico on Universal Music Mexico. They also played in New York City where they caught the attention of Blondie who said they were "completely unheralded in any way and fantastic".

In early 2010, No Sleep At All was released in France on Universal Music France where they were previously invited to perform on Taratata. Creature also did charity work for War Child, by playing to collect money at a Montreal Metro station, Berri–UQAM.

During the summer of 2010, the band went to England to record their second album with Stephen Hague.

In 2011 they collaborated with Mitsou on the song "On vole", her first new music in almost a decade.

The single "Who's Hot Who's Not" was used in a commercial for BE magazine featuring Paris Hilton, and "Pop Culture" was used in a television commercial for Telus, and in an episode of the Food Network Canada cooking show, Chuck's Day Off.

== Lineup ==
- Kim Ho: vocals, guitar
- Lisa Ivy: keyboard, vocals, percussion
- Sid-Z (Sid Zanforlin): drums, vocals
- Sheenah Ko: bass, vocals

=== Past members ===
- Anastasia Culurides: bassist
- K.C.: bassist
- John Britton: percussion
- Anna Ruddick: Bassist

== Discography ==
=== Albums ===
- 2008: No Sleep At All
- 2013: Sick Imagination

=== Singles ===
- 2008 - "Pop Culture"
- 2009 - "Who's Hot Who's Not"
- 2011 - "So High"
