= Point Blank (2008 album) =

Studio album by Point Blank
- Released: August 19, 2008 (Canada)
- Genre: Canadian hip hop
- Length: 63:46
- Label: Tilt Rock/Koch
- Producer: Pikihed, Aloysius Brown of Tone Mason, Boi-1da, Big Sproxx, Alfonzo Lupusella, A. Jackson, Nick Brongers, Maza, Mazz

Singles from Point Blank
- 1. "Born and Raised in the Ghetto" Released: 2007; 2. "God Only Knows" Released: 2008; 3. "T.O. 2 O.T." Released: 2008; 4. "Game Got Deep" Released: 2009

Professional ratings
Review scores
Source	Rating
Okayplayer	(70/100)

Point Blank is the self-titled debut album of Canadian hip hop group Point Blank, released August 19, 2008 on Tilt Rock/Koch Entertainment Canada. The album's first single, "Born and Raised in the Ghetto", became a hit in 2007. Other singles include "God Only Knows", "T.O. 2 O.T.", and "Game Got Deep". The album was nominated for Rap Recording of the Year at the 2009 Juno Awards.

== Track listing ==
#	Title	Producer(s)	Featured guest(s)	Length
1.	"Intro"			0:34
2.	"Born and Raised in the Ghetto"	Pikihed		3:28
3.	"Victory"	Alfonzo Lupusella		5:03
4.	"Case Closed"	A. Jackson		4:28
5.	"Game Got Deep"	Pikihed		3:49
6.	"T.O. 2 O.T."	Nick Brongers		5:36
7.	"Interlude"			0:12
8.	"Make a Living"	Big Sproxx	Monique Spence	3:50
9.	"Pimp Shit"	Maza		3:58
10.	"Street Code"	Pikihed		4:40
11.	"Something New"	Pikihed		4:16
12.	"God Only Knows"	Aloysius Brown of Tone Mason	Mark McKay	4:17
13.	"Unholy"	Pikihed		5:30
14.	"Sensitive Thugs"	Boi-1da		3:33
15.	"Niggaz Not to Approach"	Mazz		5:50
16.	"Born and Raised in the Ghetto Remix"	Big Sproxx	Kardinal Offishall and Frankie Payne	4:48
