= Greg Sczebel =

- Also known as: SEBELL
- Born: Gregory Paul Sczebel; September 6, 1984 (age 41)
- Origin: Salmon Arm, British Columbia, Canada
- Genres: Soul, Pop, Rock
- Occupations: singer, songwriter, producer
- Instruments: keyboards, piano, vocals
- Years active: 2002–present
- Label: Soultone Records
- Website: sebellmusic.com

Greg Sczebel (born September 6, 1984), known as SEBELL, is a two-time Juno Award-winning independent singer-songwriter originally from Salmon Arm, British Columbia, Canada. He is a two-time grand prize winner in the John Lennon Songwriting Contest, a winner in the Billboard Worldwide Song Competition and was a finalist in the International Songwriting Competition.

In 2006, Sczebel was a special guest performer on CMT's "Paul Brandt's Christmas in Banff." In 2008, Sczebel joined Brandt's touring band and has performed with him regularly, playing keyboards and singing backing vocals. Sczebel has performed with Brandt at the 2008 Canada Day Celebrations on Parliament Hill in Ottawa, on numerous televised Canadian award shows (CCMA's, Junos), and most recently for Prince William and Kate Middleton during their visit to Canada.

Sczebel is endorsed by Yamaha USA Pianos and Keyboards. He has also been an active spokesperson on behalf of World Vision since 2005.

Greg Sczebel's second album, Love & the Lack Thereof released on October 13, 2009, won him a Juno Award for Contemporary Christian/Gospel Album of the Year at the 2011 Juno Awards, four awards at the 2010 GMA Canada Covenant Awards, and 8 BC Interior Music Awards (including Pop Album of the Year and Songwriter of the Year).

== Discography ==
=== Albums and EPs ===
- Here to Stay (Soultone, 2004, reviews)
- Love & the Lack Thereof (Soultone, 2009, review)
- SEBELL (2016)
- Songs For Flight Delays (2018)

=== Singles ===
- "One Starry Night" (2006)
- "Love is the Anchor" (2007)
- "Till the Sun Burns Out" (2014)
- "Promiseland" (2016)
- "FOMY" (2017)

=== Songs in other projects ===
- GMA Canada presents 30th Anniversary Collection, "Here To Stay" (CMC, 2008)
- Sea to Sea: Christmas, "One Starry Night" (LMG, 2009)

== Awards ==
Canadian Urban Music Awards (CUMA)

- 2004 nominee, Gospel Recording of the Year: Here to Stay

GMA Canada Covenant Awards

- 2004 Male Vocalist of the Year
- 2004 Rap/Hip Hop/Dance Song of the Year: "Lights Are Comin' On"
- 2005 Compilation Album of the Year: Filled With Your Glory, "Thank You" (Various Artists)
- 2005 Urban Song of the Year: "Everybody"
- 2006 nominee, Male Vocalist of the Year
- 2007 nominee, Male Vocalist of the Year
- 2007 nominee, Seasonal Song of the Year: "One Starry Night"
- 2008 Song of the Year: "Love Is The Anchor"
- 2010 Blessings "Fan Choice Award"
- 2010 Male Vocalist of the Year
- 2010 Pop/Contemporary Album of the Year: Love & The Lack Thereof
- 2010 Video of the Year: "I Will Come"

International Songwriting Competition (ISC)

- 2005 Finalist, Gospel/Christian Music: "In The Pocket"
- 2007 Third Place, Gospel/Christian Music: "Homeland"
- 2007 Semi-Finalist, Pop/Top 40: "Love Is The Anchor"

John Lennon Songwriting Contest

- 2004 Grand Prize Winner, Gospel Category: "Here to Stay"
- 2005 Finalist, Session I, R&B Category: "You've Got It"
- 2007 Grand Prize Winner, Session II, Gospel Category: "Homeland"

Juno Awards

- 2005 Contemporary Christian/Gospel Album of the Year: Here To Stay
- 2011, Contemporary Christian/Gospel Album of the Year: Love & the Lack Thereof

Shai Awards (formerly The Vibe Awards)

- 2003 Best Emerging Artist
- 2005 Contemporary/Pop Album of the Year: Here to Stay
- 2005 Urban/Soul Album of the Year: Here to Stay
- 2005 Song of the Year: "In the Pocket"

Western Canadian Music Awards

- 2005 Outstanding Christian Recording: Here to Stay
