= So Much for Substitutes =

So Much For Substitutes

Studio album by downhere
- Released: June 10, 2003
- Recorded: Dec 2002 – Feb 2003
- Genre: Christian rock
- Length: 55:57
- Label: Word Entertainment
- Producer: Jimmie Lee Sloas

Downhere chronology
downhere (2001)	So Much For Substitutes (2003)	Wide-Eyed and Mystified (2006)

Professional ratings
Review scores
Source	Rating
Christianity Today	4.5/5 stars

So Much for Substitutes is the second official album release by Christian rock band Downhere, the first to include current bassist Glenn Lavender and last to be released under Word Records. The label dropped the band from their roster in 2004, despite the band garnering nominations and awards for the album; winning the 2003 Covenant Award for Modern Rock/Alternative Album of the Year, and receiving nominations in 2004 for the GMA Music Award for Rock/Contemporary Album of the Year, and the Juno Award for Contemporary Christian/Gospel Album of the Year. The song "What It's Like" won the 2003 Covenant Award for Alternative Song of the Year and the song "Breaking Me Down" won the 2004 GMA Music Award for Modern Rock Recorded Song of the Year.

== Track listing ==
All songs written by Jason Germain and Marc Martel. Tracks 3 & 7 co-written with Glenn Lavender.

1. "What It's Like" – 3:42
2. "Stone" – 3:54
3. "Breaking Me Down" – 3:19
4. "Iliad" – 5:04
5. "Starspin" - 5:56
6. "Feels Like Winter" – 3:37
7. "Walls" – 3:50
8. "How They Love Each Other" – 3:42
9. "Headed" – 3:23
10. "In America" – 3:50
11. "Comatose" – 4:08
12. "Last Night's Daydream" – 6:45
13. "Home" (hidden track) – 4:39

== Personnel ==
Downhere

- Jason Germain – lead and backing vocals, acoustic piano, keyboards, Hammond B3 organ, acoustic guitar, group vocals
- Marc Martel – lead and backing vocals, acoustic guitar, electric guitar, sitar, group vocals
- Glenn Lavender – acoustic guitar, bass guitar, string arrangements, group vocals
- Jeremy Thiessen – drums

Additional musicians

- Ken Lewis – percussion
- Richie Biggs – tambourine
- Jimmie Lee Sloas – tambourine, group vocals
- Bob Mason – cello
- Kristin Wilkinson – viola
- David Angell – second violin
- David Davidson – first violin
- Amy Lorber – group vocals

Production

- Jimmie Lee Sloas – producer
- Shawn McSpadden – executive producer
- Blaine Barcus – A&R
- Richie Biggs – recording, mixing
- Peter Coleman – mixing
- James Bauer – assistant engineer
- Jeremy David Cottrell – assistant engineer, mix assistant
- Brandon Epps – assistant engineer
- Erick Jaskowiak – assistant engineer
- Mike Knowles – assistant engineer
- Michael Modesto – assistant engineer
- Vance Powell – assistant engineer
- David Yeager – assistant engineer
- Stephen Marcussen – mastering
- Tammie Harris Cleek – creative director
- Wayne Brezkina – art direction, design layout
- David Johnson – photography
- David Kay – wardrobe design
- Robin Geary – grooming

== Singles ==
- "Breaking Me Down" (2003)
- "Starspin" (2003/2004)
- "What It's Like" (2003/2004)
