= Downhere =

Canadian Christian rock band

- Promotional photo of the band from 2010

Background information
- Origin: Caronport, Saskatchewan, Canada
- Genres: Christian rock, alternative rock
- Years active: 1999–2012
- Labels: Word, Centricity
- Past members: Marc Martel; Jason Germain; Glenn Lavender; Jeremy Thiessen; Tyson Manning; Corey Doak
- Website: downhere.com

Downhere (stylized as downhere) was a Christian rock band from Canada. They have released six studio albums to date: Downhere (2001), So Much for Substitutes (2003), Wide-Eyed and Mystified (2006), Ending Is Beginning (2008), How Many Kings: Songs for Christmas (2009), and On the Altar of Love (2011), and have won several Juno and Covenant Awards.

== History ==
=== Early years (1999–2001) ===
The band was formed by Marc Martel and Jason Germain, who were roommates at Briercrest Bible College in Caronport, Saskatchewan. In 1999 Martel and Germain added fellow Canadians Jeremy Thiessen and Tyson Manning, along with American Corey Doak, and released an eponymous debut album independently on Slyngshot Records. Tyson and Doak left the band, and later on Downhere signed with Word Records. In February 2001, they moved to Nashville, Tennessee. The band soon added bassist Glenn Lavender, whom they had met two years earlier, after his band had broken up. Downhere's independent album was reissued with the inclusion of bassist Lavender, and released in 2001 as their international debut, Downhere.

=== Mainstream and international success (2001–2012) ===
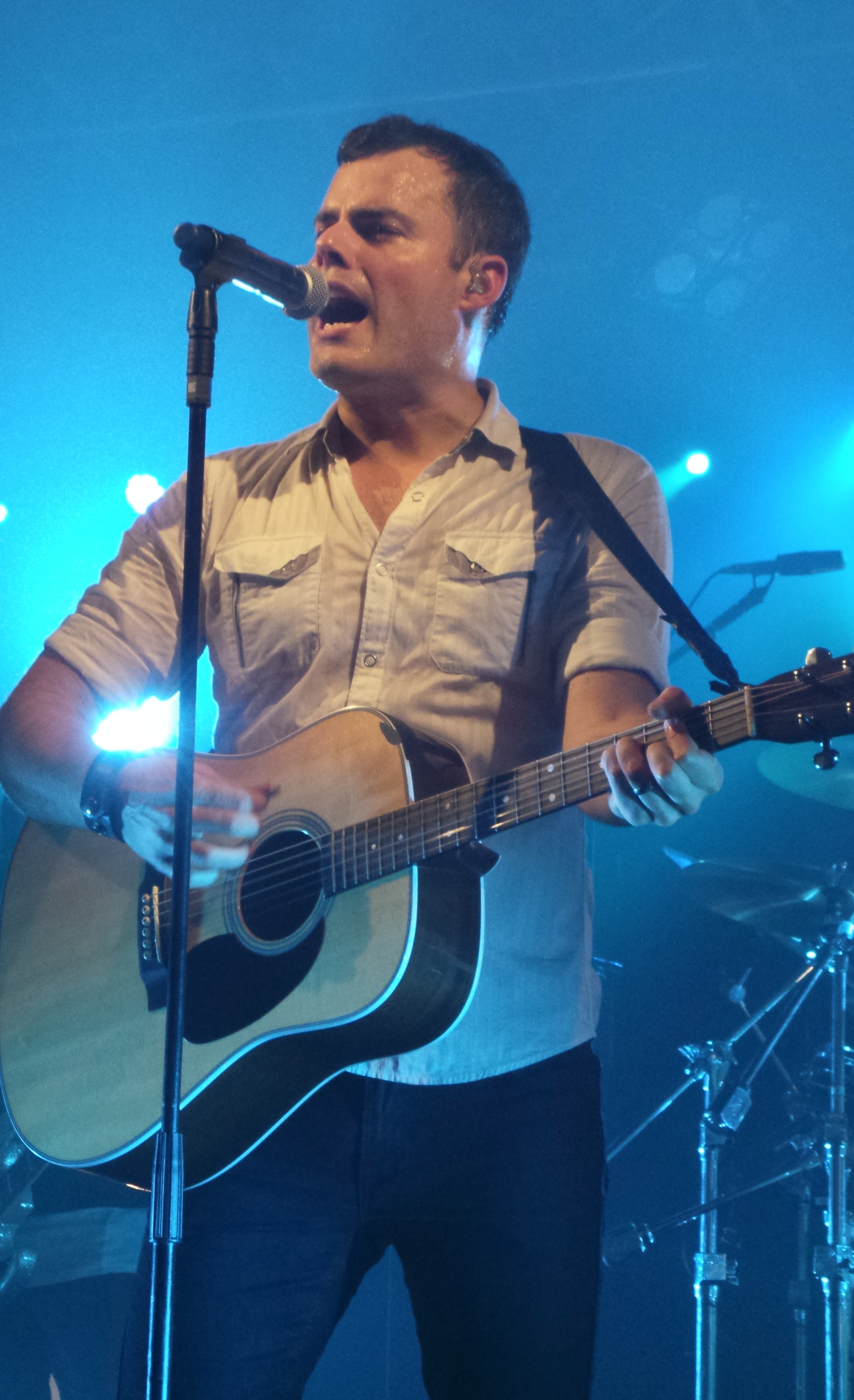
Marc Martel performing in the Queen Extravaganza Tour

Their second album, also released through Word Records, was entitled So Much For Substitutes. In 2006 they were signed to Centricity Records and released Wide-Eyed and Mystified, which won the 2007 Juno Award for Contemporary Christian/Gospel Album of the Year, and Covenant Awards for Rock Album of the Year and Recorded Song of the Year ("A Better Way").

In 2007, the band released two additional CDs that were unique. In early 2007, they released Wide-Eyed and Simplified, which contained new versions of 8 songs from Wide-Eyed and Mystified, in addition to three popular songs from earlier releases. Later in 2007, the band released Thunder After Lightning (The Uncut Demos). This album contained 15 previously unreleased demos which were considered for use on Wide-Eyed and Mystified but were not used. The CD also contained demo versions of two songs used on Wide-Eyed and Mystified. In April 2007, Downhere released Thank You for Coming (The Live Bootlegs), a six-song collection of live songs recorded in 2007 while on tour with Jason Gray and Lanae Hale.

Their next album, Ending Is Beginning, was released on September 23, 2008. The band released the songs for a few days and gave fans the chance to give input on which songs they should put on the album, and as a pre-release to Ending Is Beginning in June 2008 they gave away the whole album Wide-Eyed and Mystified as a free download.

In October 2009, they released How Many Kings: Songs for Christmas. This included "How Many Kings", which was a bonus track on Ending Is Beginning. After the release of Ending Is Beginning, Downhere released Two at a Time: Sneak Peeks & B-Sides, a collection of older songs compiled over their career, as well as two new songs: "You're Not Alone" and "The Song You Sing". "You're Not Alone" was released as a single in May 2010.

In May 2011, the first single, "Let Me Rediscover You", from their upcoming album On the Altar of Love was released. The album itself was released August 23, 2011.

In September 2011, lead singer Marc Martel also gained attention on YouTube for his cover of "Somebody to Love" by Queen, auditioning to be part of the Queen tribute band. Martel was noted for his vocal and visual resemblance to Freddie Mercury. On December 8, 2011, Martel was announced to have been voted as one of six winners (and one of three Canadians) of the contest.

In July 2012, the members of the band announced that as of January 1, 2013, they would no longer be touring together, although the band would not be broken up.

=== Hiatus (2013–present) ===
Vocalist Marc Martel released an EP, Prelude, on February 1, 2013.^{[9]} The EP was recorded in Nashville and Los Angeles with producer John Fields. His full-length debut, Impersonator, released on September 30, 2014.^{[10]}

In October 2016, the band got together for one more night to celebrate Centricity Music's 10th anniversary. The band shared live footage of the rehearsal on their Facebook page. They performed their hit song "A Better Way" at the event.

== Members ==
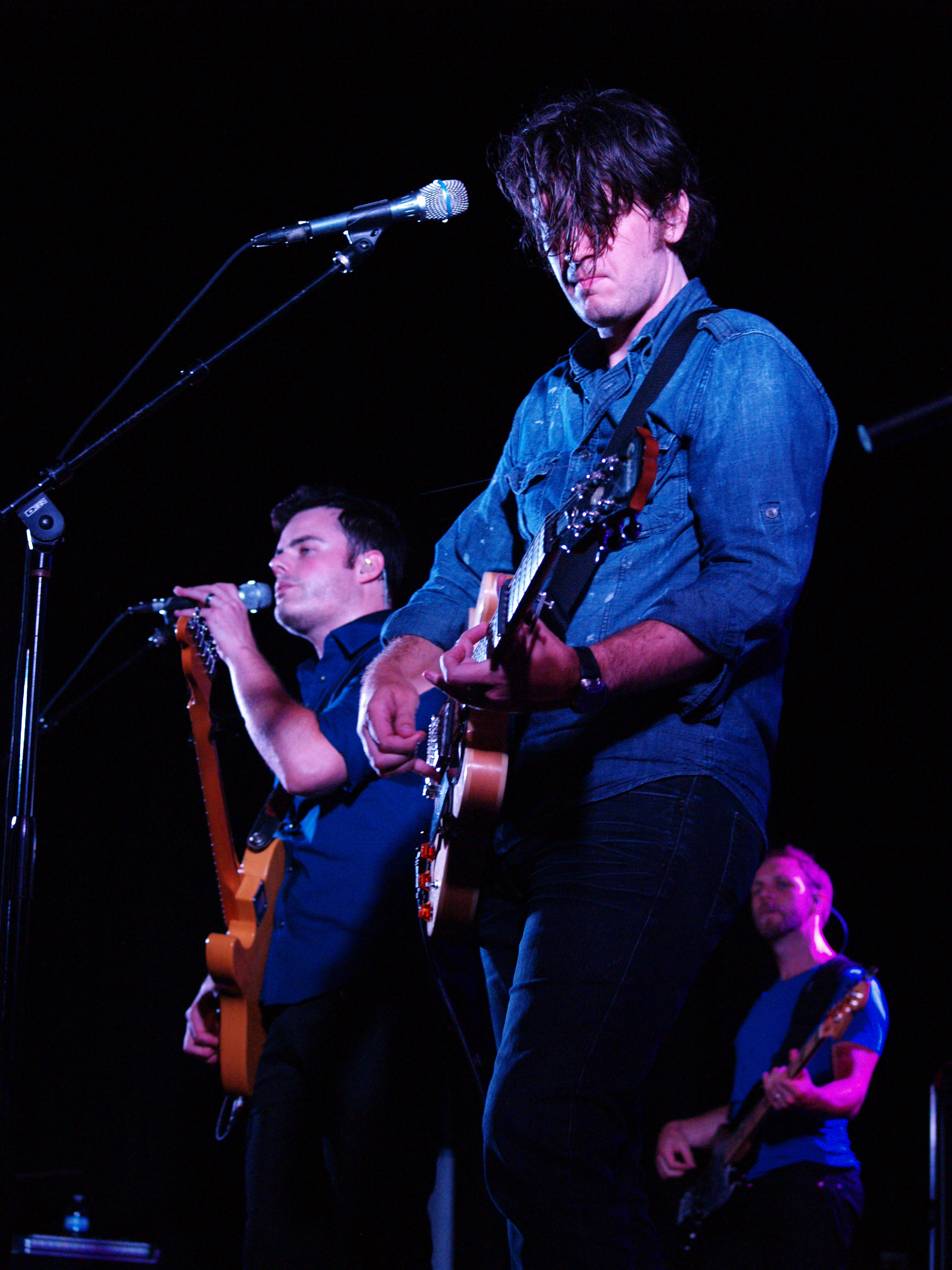
Left to right: Marc Martel, Jason Germain, and Glenn Lavender performing in 2011

- Jason Germain – lead vocals, keyboards, rhythm guitar (1999–2012)
- Marc Martel – lead vocals, lead guitar, keyboards (1999–2012)
- Jeremy Thiessen – drums, percussion (1999–2012)
- Glenn Lavender – bass guitar, backing vocals, acoustic guitar (2001–2012)
- Corey Doak – rhythm guitar, backing vocals (1999–2001)
- Tyson Manning – bass guitar (1999–2001)

== Awards and nominations ==
GMA Canada Covenant Awards

- 2002 Rock Album of the Year: Downhere
- 2002 Rock Song of the Year: "Larger Than Life"
- 2003 Modern Rock/Alternative Album of the Year: So Much For Substitutes
- 2003 Modern Rock/Alternative Song of the Year: "What It's Like"
- 2006 Rock Album of the Year: Wide-Eyed and Mystified
- 2006 Recorded Song of the Year: "A Better Way"
- 2006 Rock Song of the Year: "The More"
- 2007 nominee, Group of the Year
- 2007 nominee, Rock Song of the Year: "Surrender"
- 2009 Artist of the Year
- 2009 Album of the Year: Ending Is Beginning
- 2009 Pop/Contemporary Album of the Year: Ending Is Beginning
- 2009 Song of the Year: "Here I Am"
- 2009 Recorded Song of the Year: "Here I Am"
- 2009 Inspirational Song of the Year: "Beggar Who Gives Alms"
- 2009 Pop/Contemporary Song of the Year: "Here I Am"
- 2009 Rock Song of the Year: "My Last Amen"
- 2009 Seasonal Song of the Year: "How Many Kings"
- 2010 Group of the Year
- 2010 Seasonal Song of the Year: "Christmas In Our Hearts"
- 2010 Seasonal Album of the Year: "How Many Kings: Songs for Christmas"
- 2011 nominee, Pop/Contemporary Song of the Year: "Let Me Rediscover You"
- 2011 Pop/Contemporary Album of the Year: Two At A Time
- 2011 nominee, Artist of the Year
- 2011 nominee, Group of the Year
- 2011 nominee, Male Vocalist of the Year (Marc Martel)
- 2011 nominee, Recorded Song of the Year: "Let Me Rediscover You"
- 2011 Song of the Year: "Let Me Rediscover You"
- 2012 Group of the Year
- 2012 Album of the Year: "On the Altar of Love"
- 2012 Male Vocalist of the Year (Marc Martel)

GMA Dove Awards

- 2002 nominee, New Artist of the Year
- 2004 Modern Rock Recorded Song of the Year: "Breaking Me Down"
- 2004 nominee, Rock/Contemporary Album of the Year: So Much For Substitutes

Juno Awards

- 2002 Juno Award, winner Best Gospel Album: Downhere
- 2004 Juno Award nominee, Contemporary Christian/Gospel Album of the Year: So Much For Substitutes
- 2007 Juno Award, winner Contemporary Christian/Gospel Album of the Year: Wide-Eyed and Mystified
- 2009 Juno Award, winner Best Contemporary Christian/Gospel Album of the Year: Ending Is Beginning
- 2012 Juno Award winner Best Contemporary Christian/Gospel Album of the Year: On the Altar of Love

Shai Awards (formerly The Vibe Awards)

- 2002 Rock/Alternative Album of the Year: Downhere
- 2003 nominee, Group of the Year

Western Canadian Music Awards

- 2000 Outstanding Festival Act of the Year

== Discography ==
=== Albums ===
- Downhere (independent, 1999)
- Downhere (2001)
- So Much for Substitutes (2003)
- Wide-Eyed and Mystified (2006)
- Wide-Eyed and Simplified (2007)
- Thunder After Lightning (The Uncut Demos) (2007)
- Thank You for Coming (The Live Bootlegs) (2008)
- Ending Is Beginning (2008, review)
- How Many Kings: Songs for Christmas (2009)
- Two at a Time: Sneak Peeks & B-Sides (2010)
- On the Altar of Love (2011)
- Love and History: The Best of Downhere (compilation, 2013)

== Singles ==
Year	Title	Peak chart positions	Album
2001	"Larger Than Life"		Downhere
2001	"Free Me Up"		Downhere
2001	"Great Are You"		Downhere
2001	"Protest to Praise"		Downhere
2001	"Calmer of the Storm"		Downhere
2003	"Breaking Me Down"		So Much for Substitutes
2003	"Starspin"		So Much for Substitutes
2003	"What It's Like"		So Much for Substitutes
2006	"The More"		Wide-Eyed and Mystified
2006	"Surrender"		Wide-Eyed and Mystified
2006	"A Better Way"		Wide-Eyed and Mystified
2006	"Little Is Much"		Wide-Eyed and Mystified
2007	"Forgive Yourself"		Wide-Eyed and Mystified
2007	"The Real Jesus"		Wide-Eyed and Mystified
2007	"How Many Kings"	Christian AC - No. 4 (December 28, 2007)	Bethlehem Skyline
2007	"Glory To God in the Highest"		Bethlehem Skyline
2008	"Here I Am"	Christian AC - No. 5 (October 10, 2008)	Ending Is Beginning
2009	"Hope Is Rising"		Ending Is Beginning
2009	"My Last Amen"	Christian CHR - No. 5 (6/5/09)	Ending Is Beginning
2009	"God Rest Ye Merry Gentlemen"	Christian AC - No. 22	How Many Kings: Songs for Christmas
2009	"Christmas in Our Hearts"		How Many Kings: Songs for Christmas
2009	"Gift Carol"		How Many Kings: Songs for Christmas
2010	"You're Not Alone"		Two at a Time: Sneak Peeks & B-Sides
2011	"Let Me Rediscover You"		On the Altar of Love
2011	"Rest"		On the Altar of Love
2012	"Living the Dream"		On the Altar of Love

=== Songs on compilations ===
Year	Album	Song(s)	Label
1999	The Warehouse Mix	"Larger Than Life" & "Raincoat"	Slyngshot
2001	WOW Hits 2002	"Protest to Praise"	Sparrow
2006	Launch: Starting Line	"Everything Will"	CMC Distribution
2006	Life Is Precious: A Wes King Tribute	"Excavate"	Permanent Recordings
2007	YourMusicZone.com #1s	"A Better Way"	CMC Distribution
2007	28th Annual Covenant Hits	"A Better Way"	CMC Distribution
2007	Bethlehem Skyline	"Glory to God in the Highest" & "How Many Kings"	Centricity Music
2007	Win This War	"Grown Man" (re-work of the original song from their indie release)	
2008	Canada Rocks	"A Better Way"	CMC Distribution
2008	GMA Canada presents 30th Anniversary Collection	"What It's Like"	CMC Distribution
2009	Sea to Sea: Christmas	"God Rest Ye Merry Gentlemen"	Lakeside Media
2010	O Come All Ye Faithful: A Christmas Album	"How Many Kings"	BEC Recordings

== DVDs ==
- While the Word Is Asleep (2004)

== DVD soundtracks ==
- Party of Five: The Complete Third Season (2008)

== Movie soundtracks ==
- Joshua - "Larger Than Life"
- The Imposter - "The More"
- No Greater Love - "A Better Way"
