= K-Anthony =

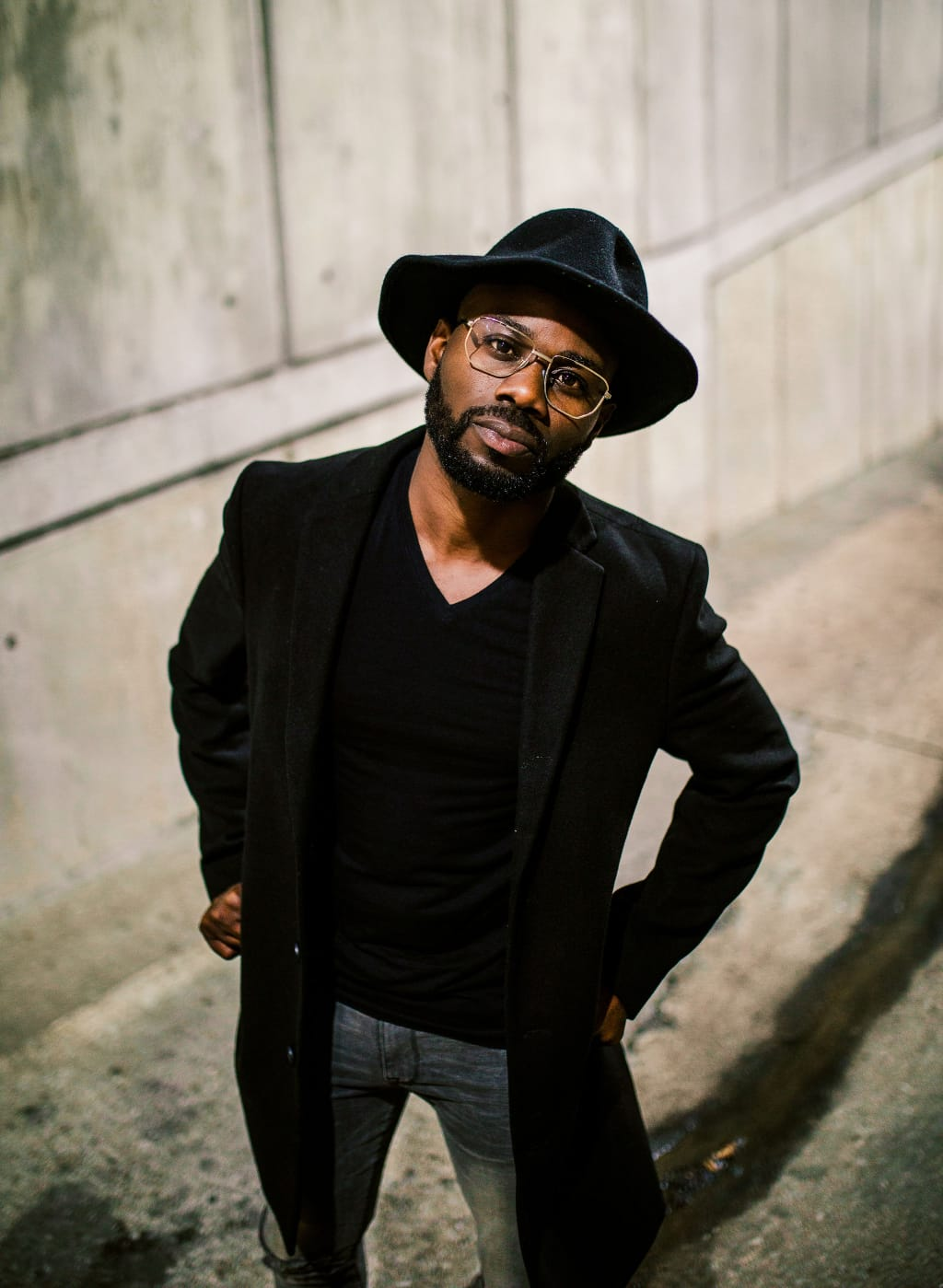

Background information
- Born: Kevin Anthony Fowler; Falmouth, Jamaica
- Genres: CCM, gospel
- Occupation: Singer / Songwriter

K-Anthony is the stage name of Kevin Anthony Fowler, a Jamaican-Canadian contemporary Christian singer and songwriter. Following a nomination in 2021 for his EP The Cure, he won the prestigious 2024 Juno Award for Contemporary Christian/Gospel Album of the Year with his EP Arrow. His song Free won "Gospel Song of the YEAR" in 2022 at the 42nd Annual GMA Canada Covenant Awards. Following his success at the 2022 Covenant Awards, he received the Gospel Artist of the Year Award in 2023.

Originally from Falmouth, Jamaica, Fowler moved to Canada in the early 2010s, and is currently based in Regina, Saskatchewan.

== Discography ==
Singles
Year	Song	Details
2014	"Heading to the Top"	Label: Independent Format: Musical Download
2014	"Somethin Outta Nothing"	Label: Barbwiya Music Format: Musical Download
2015	"Don't Give Up"	Label: Independent Format: Musical Download
2015	"God is Good"	Label: Independent Format: Musical Download
2016	"Billboard"	Label: Independent Format: Musical Download
2016	"Send Me a Song"	Label: Independent Format: Musical Download
2016	"Tomorrow You May Not"	Label: Independent Format: Musical Download
2017	"Created to Worship"	Label: Independent Format: Musical Download
2019	"I'm Alive"	Label: Independent Format: Musical Download
2019	"The Cure"	Label: Independent Format: Musical Download
2020	"Already Better"	Label: Independent Format: Musical Download
2020	"Everyday"	Label: Independent Format: Musical Download
2020	"Everywhere You Go"	Label: Independent Format: Musical Download
2020	"Holding On"	Label: Independent Format: Musical Download
2020	"More of You"	Label: Independent Format: Musical Download
2020	"My Story"	Label: Independent Format: Musical Download
2021	"Free"	Label: Independent Format: Musical Download
2022	"I Saved It All"	Label: Independent Format: Musical Download
2022	"Nobody"	Label: Independent Format: Musical Download
2022	"Stranger"	Label: Independent Format: Musical Download
2022	"Drunk"	Label: Independent Format: Musical Download
2022	"Happy"	Label: Independent Format: Musical Download
2022	"Arrow"	Label: Independent Format: Musical Download
2023	"Anxious"	Label: Independent Format: Musical Download
2023	"Fight for Me"	Label: Independent Format: Musical Download
2024	"Back to Jesus"	Label: Independent Format: Musical Download

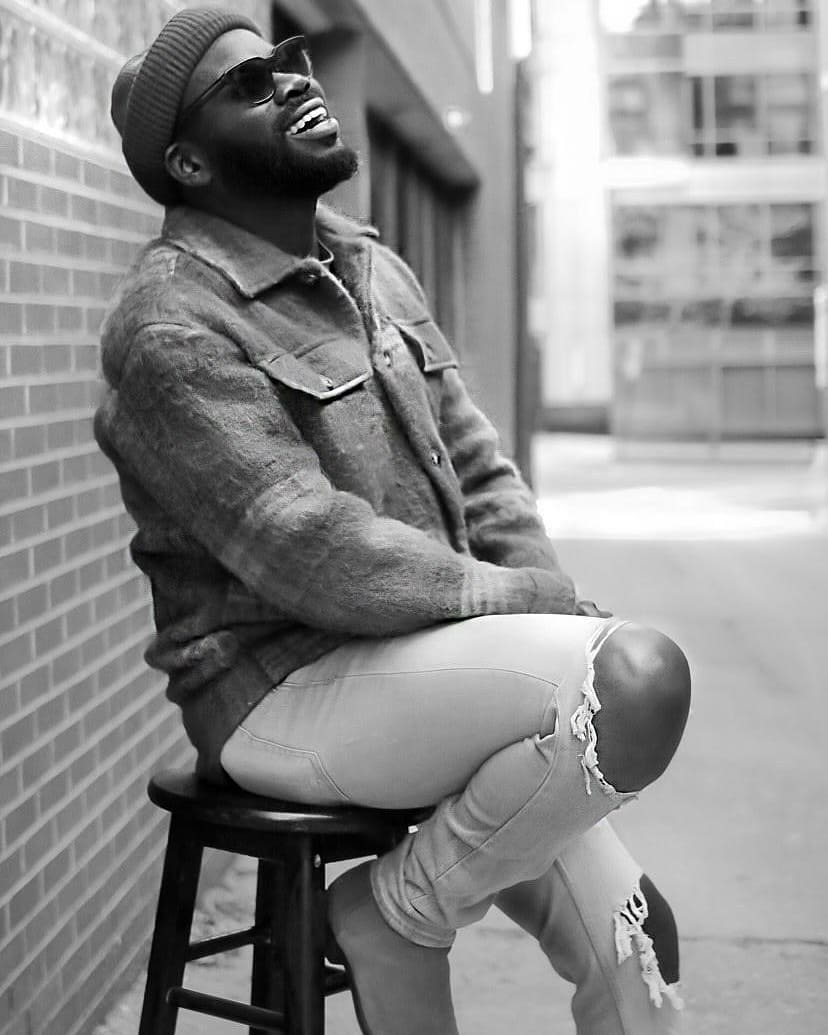
"Sometimes you have to take a seat, reflect and smile about God's many blessings and how he has set you Free" (K-Anthony, 2021)

As Featured Artist
	Song	
2021	"Trust (Farelera) Remix" (KingDMusic feat. K-Anthony)	Label: Independent Format: Musical Download
