= Newworldson =

- Origin: St. Catharines, Ontario, Canada
- Genres: Soul; contemporary Christian music; world; reggae
- Years active: 2006–present
- Label: Inpop
- Members: Joel Parisien; Mark Rogers; Leroy Emmanuel; John Irvine; Darryl Dixon; Dave Watson
- Past members: Rich Moore; Josh Toal
- Website: www.newworldson.com

Newworldson is a Canadian Christian pop/soul band based in St. Catharines, Ontario. Their musical style is very eclectic, but is principally soul music. The band is signed to Inpop Records and has toured extensively with the Newsboys. The band has toured in North America, Europe, Australia and New Zealand.

== History ==
The band was formed in a jazz bar in downtown St. Catharines, Ontario, Canada and released its debut album, Roots Revolution, in 2005.

== Critical reception and charting ==
Newworldson's Salvation Station was selected as one of the twenty best albums of 2008 by Cross Rhythms, while Christianity Today voted Salvation Station No. 3 on their list of Best Christian Albums of 2008. The album hit No. 26 on Billboard magazines's Top Heatseekers chart in 2008, and 34 on the Top Christian Albums chart. The band's third album is the self-titled Newworldson contained the single "There is a Way", which reached No. 2 on Billboard's Christian Songs chart on March 20, 2010.

== Members ==
Current

- Joel Parisien – vocals, keyboards (2006–present)
- Mark Rogers – drums (2006–present)
- Leroy Emmanuel – guitar, vocals (2013–present)
- John Irvine – bass, vocals (2013–present)
- Darryl Dixon – alto saxophone (2013–present)
- Dave Watson – tenor, baritone saxophone (2013–present)

Former

- Rich Moore – bass, vocals (2006–2012)
- Joshua Franklin Toal – guitar, vocals (2006–2012)

== Discography ==
=== Studio albums ===
Year	Album details	Peak chart positions		
Year	Album details	US Christ	US Heat	NZ
2006	Roots Revolution: Released: September 12, 2006; Label: Self-Released; Format: CD, DI	—	—	32
2008	Salvation Station: Released: February 12, 2008; Label: Inpop Records; Format: CD, DI	34	26	17
2010	Newworldson: Released: February 23, 2010; Label: Inpop Records; Format: CD, DI	15	8	10
2012	Rebel Transmission: Released: April 17, 2012; Label: Platinum Pop; Format: CD, DI	38	26	19

=== Live albums ===
Year	Album details
2014	All the Way Live: Released: November 4, 2014; Label: Platinum Pop; Format: CD, DI

=== EPs ===
Year	Album details
2007	Salvation Station EP: Released: 2007; Label: InPop Records; Format: CD, DI

=== Singles ===
Year	Title	Peak positions		Album
Year	Title	US Christ.	US Christ AC	Album
2007	"Salvation Station"	—	—	Salvation Station
2008	"Workin' Man"	—	—	Salvation Station
2008	"Sweet Holy Spirit"	—	—	Salvation Station
2009	"There is a Way"	2	2	Newworldson
2009	"That's Exactly How I Like It"	—	—	Newworldson
2011	"Learning to Be the Light"	4	4	Rebel Transmission
2012	"Today"	43	29	Rebel Transmission

=== Songs on compilations ===
- YourMusicZone.com No. 1s, "Down From The Mountain" (CMC, 2007)
- Canada Rocks, "Salvation Station" (CMC, 2008)
- Now Hear This: Winter 2010 Sampler, "You Set the Rhythm" (Sparrow, 2010)
- WOW New & Next, "You Set The Rhythm" (EMI CMG, 2010)

== Awards and recognition ==
Gospel Music Association Canada Covenant Awards

- 2007 New Artist of the Year
- 2007 Folk/Roots Album of the Year: Roots Revolution
- 2008 Folk/Roots Album of the Year: Salvation Station
- 2009 Group of the Year
- 2010 Folk/Roots Album of the Year: Newworldson
- 2010 Recorded Song of the Year: "There Is A Way"
- 2010 Pop/Contemporary Song of the Year: "There Is A Way"

Juno Awards

- 2008 nominee, Contemporary Christian/Gospel Album of the Year: Roots Revolution
- 2009 nominee, Contemporary Christian/Gospel Album of the Year: Salvation Station
- 2011 nominee, Contemporary Christian/Gospel Album of the Year: Newworldson
