= Newworldson (album) =

Studio album by Newworldson
- Released: February 23, 2010
- Genre: CCM
- Length: 45:44
- Label: Inpop
- Producer: Justin Koop

Newworldson chronology
| Salvation Station (2008) | Newworldson (2010) |

Singles from Newworldson
- 1. "There is a Way" Released: 2009; 2. "That's Exactly How I Like It" Released: 2009

Newworldson is the self-titled second album from Canadian Christian soul band Newworldson. The album surpassed the band's previous effort, Salvation Station, in chart positions, peaking at No. 8 on the Billboard Heatseekers chart and No. 15 on the Billboard Christian albums chart. It was nominated for a 2011 Juno Award in the category of Contemporary Christian/Gospel Album of the Year.

== Track listing ==
Professional ratings
Review scores
| Source | Rating |
|---|---|
| Chosen for Grace | 3/5 stars |
| Christian Music Zine | 3/5 stars |
| Christianity Today | 3/5 stars |
| Christian Music Review | 9.5/10 stars |
| Indie Vision Music | 6/10 stars |
| Jesus Freak Hideout | 4.5/5 stars |
| The Joint | 4/5 stars |
| The Phantom Tollbooth | 4.5/5 stars |

All tracks are written by Newworldson, except where noted.

Album release
| No. | Title | Writer(s) | Length |
|---|---|---|---|
| 1. | "You Set the Rhythm" | | 3:03 |
| 2. | "Listen to the Lord" | | 2:53 |
| 3. | "In Your Arms" | | 3:01 |
| 4. | "There is a Way" | Newworldson, Thomas "Tawgs" Salter | 4:20 |
| 5. | "Do You Believe In Love?" | | 3:11 |
| 6. | "That's Exactly (How I Like It)" | | 3:34 |
| 7. | "Rocky Road" | | 5:32 |
| 8. | "Commander" | | 3:03 |
| 9. | "Total Eclipse" | | 3:38 |
| 10. | "O Lament" | | 4:13 |
| 11. | "Jamaican Praise Medley: Daddy Oh/Catch on Fire/He's a Miracle/By Force" | Margaret Greem Clark, Clifton Clarke, Jason Mighty, Calvin Whilby | 5:11 |
| 12. | "Weary" | | 4:05 |
| Total length: | | | 45:44 |

== Personnel ==
- Joel Parisien - vocals, keyboards
- Joshua Franklin Toal - guitar, vocals
- Rich Moore - bass, vocals
- Mark Rogers - drums
