= No Sleep at All (Creature album) =

Studio album by Creature
- Released: 4 March 2008
- Genre: Indie pop
- Label: Universal Music Canada, Universal Music Mexico, Universal Music France

No Sleep at All is the debut studio album by Canadian indie pop band Creature, released on March 3, 2008. "Pop Culture" is the first single released from the album.

== Track listing ==
1. "Who's Hot Who's Not"
2. "Don't Be Afraid"
3. "Pop Culture"
4. "Brigitte Bardot"
5. "Alive"
6. "Pay Up"
7. "Property"
8. "Kandahar"
9. "(Last Days Of) America"
10. "It's Over"
11. "Star"
