= Wide-Eyed and Mystified =

Wide-Eyed And Mystified

Studio album by downhere
- Released: May 23, 2006
- Recorded: Nov 2005 – Jan 2006
- Genre: Christian rock
- Length: 54:11
- Label: Centricity Music
- Producer: Mark Heimermann; Greg Collins downhere

Downhere chronology
So Much for Substitutes (2003)	Wide-Eyed And Mystified (2006)	Wide-Eyed and Simplified (2007)

Wide-Eyed and Mystified is the third official album release by Christian rock band Downhere. It is the 1st official album release through Centricity Music, to which the band was signed in 2005.

== Critical reception ==
Professional ratings
Review scores
Source	Rating
Allmusic	4.5/5 stars
CCM Magazine	A
Christianity Today	4.5/5 stars
Cross Rhythms	5/5 stars
Jesus Freak Hideout	5/5 stars
New Release Tuesday	5/5 stars

Allmusic's Jared Johnson said that the album title "is a line in the infectious track "The More," referring to the awe with which we look at God." Johnson called the album a "masterly crafted melodic rock." Johnson evoked that "the theme is uplifting, but you never feel like the guys are talking down to you."

CCM Magazine's Andrea Bailey noted how the lyrics on this album "indicate a deep, seasoned relationship with the Lord, subtly interweaving paraphrased scripture with themes of love and surrender". Bailey proclaimed this album to be a "drive-with-the-windowsdown fare that rocks more smartly and cleanly than ever."

Christianity Today's Russ Breimeier alluded to how the album as "successfully captures both styles. Combining a pounding piano with thick guitars".

Cross Rhythms's Mike Rimmer praised this as being "their absolute best and this is my first candidate for album of the year 2006."

Jesus Freak Hideout's Matt Johnson acclaimed "If you pass on this one, you're making a big mistake. Not only is this the best yet from downhere, but it's also one of the best records of the year to this point! Downhere fans will be eating this up. Pop-rock fans will be hard pressed to find anything better for their money, and people just looking for a more 'artsy' approach at popular Christian music would do well by themselves to not let this one slip through the cracks. This could be the sleeper hit of the year!"

New Release Tuesday's Kevin Davis also praised this as being "literally Unbelievable in its greatness."

== Track listing ==
All tracks are written by Jason Germain and Marc Martel

Wide-Eyed and Mystified
No.	Title	Length
1.	"The More"	3:48
2.	"Surrender"	4:34
3.	"A Better Way"	4:40
4.	"Dying to Know You"	3:30
5.	"I Will Follow Your Voice"	4:56
6.	"Little Is Much"	3:46
7.	"Stir"	3:17
8.	"Forgive Yourself"	4:05
9.	"Unbelievable"	4:39
10.	"The Real Jesus"	4:17
11.	"Remember Me"	4:06
12.	"1000 Miles Apart"	3:35
13.	"I Miss You Here"	4:50
Total length:		54:11

== Personnel ==
Downhere

- Jason Germain – vocals, keyboards, guitars, string arrangements (1, 2, 3, 5, 9, 10)
- Marc Martel – vocals, keyboards, guitars
- Glenn Lavender – bass
- Jeremy Thiessen – drums, percussion

Additional Musicians

- Greg Collins – synthesizers (4, 8, 11, 12), Mellotron (4, 8, 11, 12), electric guitar (4, 8, 11, 12)
- Zac Rae – Mellotron (4, 8, 11, 12)
- David Angell – strings (1, 2, 3, 5, 9, 10)
- David Davidson – strings (1, 2, 3, 5, 9, 10)
- Sarighani Reist – strings (1, 2, 3, 5, 9, 10)
- Kristin Wilkinson – strings (1, 2, 3, 5, 9, 10)

Production

- Mark Heimmerman – producer (1, 2, 3, 5, 9, 10)
- Greg Collins – producer (4, 8, 11, 12)
- Downhere – producers (6, 7, 13)
- John Mays – executive producer

== Singles ==
- "The More" (2006) - Rock & CHR
- "Surrender" (2006) - CHR
- "A Better Way" (2006) - AC
- "Little Is Much" (2006) - AC
- "Forgive Yourself" (2007)
- "The Real Jesus" (2007)

== Accolades ==
This album won a 2007 Juno Award for Contemporary Christian/Gospel Album of the Year.
