= How Many Kings: Songs for Christmas =

Studio album by downhere
- Released: October 6, 2009
- Genre: Christian rock, Christmas music
- Length: 44:31
- Label: Centricity
- Producer: downhere

Downhere chronology
Ending Is Beginning (2008)	How Many Kings: Songs for Christmas (2009)	Two at a Time: Sneak Peeks & B-Sides (2010)

Professional ratings
Review scores
Source	Rating
JesusFreakHideout.com	4.5/5 stars
Louder Than the Music	3/5 stars

How Many Kings: Songs for Christmas is the fifth official album release from Christian rock band downhere released on October 6, 2009.

== Track listing ==
1. "How Many Kings" – 4:19
2. "God Rest Ye Merry Gentlemen" – 3:05
3. "Angels from the Realms of Glory" – 4:21
4. "Christmas In Our Hearts" – 4:19
5. "Silent Night" – 3:51
6. "Good King Wenceslas" – 3:03
7. "What Child Is This" – 3:05
8. "Bring a Torch, Jeanette, Isabella" – 3:35
9. "Five Golden Rings" – 0:11
10. "Glory to God in the Highest" – 3:25
11. "Gift Carol" – 4:03
12. "We Wish You a Merry Christmas" – 1:51
13. "How Many Kings [Re-Imagined]" – 5:30
