= Wide-Eyed and Simplified =

Wide-Eyed And Simplified

Live album by downhere
- Released: March 13, 2007
- Recorded: September 2006
- Genre: Christian rock/Modern Rock
- Length: 60:10
- Label: Centricity Music
- Producer: downhere

Downhere chronology
Wide-Eyed And Mystified (2006)	Wide-Eyed And Simplified (2007)	Thunder After The Lightning: The Uncut Demos (2007)

Wide-Eyed and Simplified is the first intermediate album release (between major official releases) from Christian rock band Downhere. The album features 'live' studio recorded acoustic versions of 8 songs from Wide-Eyed and Mystified, as well as 3 other popular songs from previous releases. Each song is introduced by spoken word, which features the band members.

== Track listing ==
1. The More (Intro) – 1:45
2. The More – 3:52
3. Surrender (Intro) – 1:28
4. Surrender – 4:25
5. A Better Way (Intro) – 1:43
6. A Better Way – 4:39
7. Little Is Much (Intro) – 2:38
8. Little Is Much – 3:32
9. Stir – Intro – 1:32
10. Stir – 3:04
11. Unbelievable (Intro) – 2:44
12. Unbelievable – 4:34
13. The Real Jesus (Intro) – 1:21
14. The Real Jesus – 4:49
15. Remember Me (Intro) – 1:28
16. Remember Me – 4:06
17. What It's Like (Intro) – 1:23
18. What It's Like – 5:09
19. Great Are You (Intro) – 2:40
20. Great Are You – 4:20
21. Protest To Praise (Intro) – 0:51
22. Protest To Praise – 4:44
