= Chasing the Sun (Tara Oram album) =

Studio album by Tara Oram
- Released: October 7, 2008
- Genre: Country
- Length: 47:53
- Label: Open Road

Tara Oram chronology
Chasing the Sun (2008)	Revival (2011)

Singles from Chasing the Sun
- 1. "Fly Girl" Released: June 23, 2008; 2. "538 Stars" Released: November 17, 2008; 3. "Go to Bed Angry" Released: March 16, 2009; 4. "Living the Dream" Released: August 3, 2009

Chasing the Sun is the debut studio album by Canadian country music singer Tara Oram. It was released in Canada on October 7, 2008.

== Track listing ==
No.	Title	Writer(s)	Length
1.	"Fly Girl"	Kaci Bolls, Marvin Green	4:16
2.	"What Didn't Kill Me"	Rachel Proctor, Bruce Wallace	2:58
3.	"538 Stars"	Hillary Lindsey, Gordie Sampson	3:41
4.	"Don't Tell Me"	Julie Miller, Steven P. Miller	4:05
5.	"Living the Dream"	Carolyn Dawn Johnson, Tara Oram	4:55
6.	"Go to Bed Angry"	Carl Bjorsell, Tebey, Sebastian Thott	4:48
7.	"No Easy Way Out"	Wade Kirby, Liz Rose, Kim Tribble	3:12
8.	"Call You When I Get There"	Nicole Hughes, Chris Perry, Chris Peters	3:22
9.	"Ain't Gonna Happen"	Proctor, Wallace	3:36
10.	"Taste of the Good Life"	Kelly Archer, Oram, Justin Weaver	3:44
11.	"The Call"	Jeff Callery	5:09
12.	"Wildfire"	Billy Burnett, Hughes, Perry	4:07

== Chart performance ==
=== Singles ===
Year	Single	Peak positions
Year	Single	CAN
2008	"Fly Girl"	77
2008	"538 Stars"	98
2009	"Go to Bed Angry"	—
2009	"Living the Dream"	—
"—" denotes releases that did not chart
