= Ending Is Beginning =

Ending is Beginning

Studio album by Downhere
- Released: September 23, 2008
- Genre: Christian rock
- Length: 52:35
- Label: Centricity
- Producer: Mark Heimermann, Stephen Gause, Downhere

Downhere chronology
Thank You For Coming (The Live Bootlegs) (2008)	Ending is Beginning (2008)	How Many Kings: Songs for Christmas (2009)

Ending Is Beginning is the fifth official album release from Christian rock band Downhere. It was released on September 23, 2008. In May 2008, fans played a part in selecting the songs chosen for this album by rating and scoring 17 potential songs on audioscorecard.com.

== Release ==
The song "Here I Am" was released on June 27, 2008, and the songs "Hope Is Rising" and "My Last Amen" was released on February 13, 2009.

== Critical reception ==
Professional ratings
Review scores
Source	Rating
Christian Manifesto	3.5/5 stars
Christian Music Review	5/5 stars
Christianity Today	5/5 stars
Cross Rhythms	5/5 stars
Jesus Freak Hideout	4.5/5 stars
Melodic.net	5/5 stars

Christian Manifesto's Thomas Jenkins said "sadly though, they don't manage to avoid all of the pitfalls of most modern music...overall though, these problems are slight, and there's definitely more good than bad here." Jenkins noted the band "has done something many have tried and failed to do; they've created a solid mainstream pop album with lasting appeal." In addition, Jenkins states the album "venture out here. managed to break the mold."

Christian Music Review's Kevin Davis stated "this album is truly 5 stars (98% perfect) and is my top album of 2008!"

Christianity Today's Russ Breimeier evoked the album "demonstrates the band's deft balance of artistry and ministry with songs that reveal new depths in music and lyricism". Breimeier praised the album because it "further cements the band's place in Christian music for their artful expressions of our faith." Lastly, Breimeier said with respect to this album that downhere "hit their stride".

Cross Rhythms's Lins Honeyman replied that "building on the strengths of their previous three albums, Canadian rock group Downhere return with a stunning release that may just be their best yet. Containing some striking musical imagery courtesy of producers Mark Heimermann (dc Talk, Michael W. Smith) and Stephen Gause (Jars of Clay) plus some refreshingly articulate songwriting, Ending Is Beginning finds the band on top form."

Jesus Freak Hideout's Matt Johnson noted that this album "once again, beautifully features the band's two contrasting lead vocalists. The utilization of Martel's higher range, Germaine's lower range, and the two playing off of each other (depending upon the desired mood for the song) creates not just something unique, but lasting impressions of the songs as well. The depth of this duo doesn't just end on the performance side but is also evident in the composition of the lyrics" Johnson told that "all in all, Downhere brings a solid offering from almost every perspective yet again. If you find yourself listening to the radio and thinking about how stale so much of Christian pop-rock has become, then Ending is Beginning is definitely a record you want to pick up. It's a little hard to come away disappointed from this one."

== Track listing ==
All tracks are written by Jason Germain and Marc Martel

CD track order
No.	Title	Length
1.	"Bleed for This Love"	4:15
2.	"Here I Am"	3:43
3.	"Cathedral Made of People"	4:51
4.	"My Last Amen"	4:00
5.	"Hope Is Rising"	4:41
6.	"Something Heavenly"	3:47
7.	"Coming Back Home"	4:01
8.	"All at War"	3:47
9.	"Don't Miss Now"	4:03
10.	"Live for You"	3:23
11.	"The Problem"	4:25
12.	"The Beggar Who Gives Alms"	3:16
13.	"How Many Kings" (Bonus Track)	4:23
Total length:		52:35

=== Excluded tracks ===
The four of the seventeen tracks that were excluded were the following: "Everything to Lose", "One Small Step", "Stand With Me" and "Break My Heart". They are included on the album Two at a Time: Sneak Peeks & B-Sides.

== Personnel ==
Downhere

- Jason Germain – lead and backing vocals, keyboards, guitars, choir (3)
- Marc Martel – lead and backing vocals, guitars, additional keyboards, choir (3)
- Glenn Lavender – bass guitar, cornet, backing vocals, choir (3)
- Jeremy Thiessen – drums, backing vocals, choir (3)

Additional Musicians

- Stephen Gause – programming (3), choir (3, 11), trombone (7), keyboards (8)
- Paul Nelson – cello (3, 10)
- Kara Gause – choir (11)

Production

- John Mays – executive producer
- Downhere – producers (1, 9, 13)
- Mark Heimmerman – producer (2, 4, 5, 6)
- Stephen Gause – producer (3, 7, 8, 10, 11), recording (3, 7, 8, 10, 11), mixing (7, 11)
- Chris Brush – producer (12), recording (12), mixing (12)
- Todd Robbins – recording (1, 2, 4, 5, 6, 9), mixing (2, 4, 5, 6)
- F. Reid Shippen – mixing (1, 9)
- Gary Ryan – assistant engineer (1, 9)
- Myron Wengard – assistant engineer (1, 9)
- Buckley Miller – mix assistant (1, 9)
- George CocchinI – guitar technician (1, 9)
- Joe Baldridge – guitar recording (2, 4, 5, 6)
- David Wilson – recording assistant (2, 4, 5, 6), mix assistant (2, 4, 5, 6)
- Jimmy Jernigan – mixing (3, 8, 10)
- Ben Phillips – additional recording (3, 7, 8, 10, 11), drum recording (3, 7, 8, 10, 11)
- Andrew Mendelson – mastering at Georgetown Masters, Nashville, Tennessee
- Rusty Ralston – photography
- Tec Petaja – band photography

Studios

- The Workshop, Franklin, Tennessee - recording location, mixing location
- Dark Horse Recording Studio, Franklin, Tennessee - recording location
- The Olive Room, Nashville, Tennessee - recording location
- Vibe 56, Nashville, Tennessee - recording location
- Invertigo Productions, Nashville, Tennessee - recording location
- Bletchley Park, Nashville, Tennessee - recording location
- Catchframe Productions, Cambridge, Ontario - recording location
- The Playground, Nashville, Tennessee - mixing location
- Invertigo Productions, Nashville, Tennessee - mixing location
- Apollo 54, Nashville, Tennessee - mixing location

== Charts ==
=== Album ===
Chart (2011)	Peak positions
US Billboard Christian Albums	17
US Billboard Heatseekers Albums	12

=== Singles ===
Year	Single	Peak chart positions
Year	Single	US Christian
2008	"Here I Am"	Uncharted
2009	"Hope Is Rising"	Uncharted
2009	"My Last Amen"	30
