= Downhere (2001 album) =

downhere

Studio album by downhere
- Released: October 16, 2001
- Recorded: 2001
- Genre: Christian rock
- Length: 53:39
- Label: Word Records
- Producer: Nathan Nockels

Downhere chronology
downhere (independent) (1999)	downhere (2001)	So Much for Substitutes (2003)

Professional ratings
Review scores
Source	Rating
Christianity Today	4.5/5 stars
Jesus Freak Hideout	4.5/5 stars

downhere is the first official album release under a major record label by Christian rock band downhere. It is only preceded by their 1st (and now out of print) independent album release. The album received the 2002 Covenant Award for Rock Album of the Year and the 2002 Juno Award for Best Gospel Album. The song "Larger Than Life" received the 2002 Covenant Award for Rock Song of the Year and "Protest to Praise" was featured on the WOW Hits 2002 compilation.

The album consists of new songs written for this debut release with Word Records, plus a selection of songs from the previous independent release that were re-recorded. Current bassist Glenn Lavender only appears on the album for the hidden-track "Rock Stars Need Money". His membership in the band wasn't finalized in enough time (after the departure of first bassist, Tyson Manning) for him to appear on the rest of the album, so Nashville studio musicians were used instead. Glenn Lavender already had an association with the band, as they previously met at a 1999 Word Vision Artist Retreat in Florida, USA.

== Track listing ==
All songs written by Jason Germain and Marc Martel.

1. "Larger Than Life" - 4:26
2. "Free Me Up" - 4:07
3. "Reconcile" - 4:30
4. "Raincoat" - 4:14
5. "Great Are You" - 5:01
6. "Calmer of the Storm" - 5:04
7. "Making Me" - 4:19
8. "Protest to Praise" - 5:07
9. "Breathing In" - 4:10
10. "So Blue" - 4:08
11. "All The Reasons Why" - 2:54
12. "Rock Stars Need Money" (hidden track) - 5:32

== Credits ==
Downhere

- Jason Germain – lead and backing vocals, acoustic piano, keyboards, Hammond B3 organ, acoustic guitar
- Marc Martel – lead and backing vocals, acoustic guitar, electric guitar, dobro, harmonica
- Glenn Lavender – bass
- Jeremy Thiessen – drums, percussion

Additional Musicians

- Jeff Roach – keyboards
- Nathan Nockels – accordion, acoustic guitar
- Jerry McPherson – acoustic guitar, electric guitar
- Gary Burnette – guitars
- Mark Hill – bass
- Pat Malone – bass
- Dan Needham – drums, percussion
- Ken Lewis – percussion
- Skip Cleavinger – Uilleann pipes, penny whistle
- Tom Howard – string arrangements

Production

- Nathan Nockels – producer, overdub recording
- Jason Germain – co-producer
- Marc Martel – co-producer
- Judith Volz – executive producer
- Craig A. Mason – A&R
- Todd Robbins – recording
- David Streit – recording assistant
- Tom Laune – mixing
- Paul Angelli – mastering
- Louis LaPrad – art direction, design
- Ben Pearson – photography

Studios

- Recorded at The Bennett House (Franklin, Tennessee) and Bridgeway Studios (Nashville, Tennessee).
- Overdubbed at Watermark Studios (Atlanta, Georgia) and Dark Horse Recording Studio (Franklin, Tennessee).
- Mixed at Bridgeway Studios
- Mastered at Sterling Sound (New York City, New York).

== Singles ==
- "Larger Than Life" (2001)
- "Free Me Up" (2001)
- "Great Are You" (2001)
- "Protest To Praise" (2001)
- "Calmer of the Storm" (2001)
