= On the Altar of Love =

Studio album by downhere
- Released: August 23, 2011
- Recorded: January 2011 – March 2011
- Genre: Contemporary Christian music
- Length: 47:06
- Label: Centricity
- Producer: Mark Heimermann

Downhere chronology
| Two at a Time: Sneak Peeks & B-Sides (2010) | On the Altar of Love (2011) |

On the Altar of Love is the sixth and final studio album release from contemporary Christian music band downhere. The album won the 2012 Juno Award for Best Contemporary Christian/Gospel Album of the Year.

== Critical reception ==
Professional ratings
Review scores
| Source | Rating |
|---|---|
| Christian Broadcasting Network | 3/5 spins |
| CCM Magazine | 4/5 stars |
| Christian Manifesto | 4/5 stars |
| Today's Christian Entertainment | 4.7/5 stars |
| Christian Music Zine | 4.5/5 stars |
| Christianity Today | 3/5 stars |
| Cross Rhythms | 8/10 stars |
| Jesus Freak Hideout | 4/5 stars |
| Jesus Freak Hideout | 4.5/5 stars |
| Louder Than the Music | 4/5 stars |
| New Release Tuesday | 5/5 stars |
| New Release Tuesday | 5/5 stars |

Christian Broadcasting Network's Hannah Goodwyn said the album "shows off the vocal talent of co-founders Marc Martel and Jason Germain." CCM Magazine's Andrew Greer noted that the album "finds the fellas' already superb songwriting advancing to challenge believers' complacency and break beyond the church's walls to spread spiritually-informed social reform." Christian Manifesto's Lydia Akinola wrote that the album "testifies to the fact that it is still possible to create a full length album of solid tracks. As well as sharing the vocals between them". In addition, she noted the album "is hook-laden, with fantastic drum lines, impressive riffs and impressive compositions which keep us interested." Christian Music Review's (Today's Christian Entertainment) Jay Wright suggested this "is an amazingly creative album, featuring outstanding lyrics that build up Christians in their walk with the Lord." Christian Music Zine's Elizabeth Hess wrote, "the lyrics are worshipful, deep and encourage reflection on the words with a pop-soul style." She evidenced the album "describe[d] many of the characteristics of God, such as love, rest, faithfulness, goodness, creativeness and forgiveness, for example, becoming more of a worship album." Christianity Today's Kristin Garrett said the band "once again proves the group's vocal versatility and solid sound" and felt the music on the album "oscillates between poetry and over-sentimentality; however, the album's overall themes resound with the truth of divine love, redemption and healing in the face of brokenness." Cross Rhythms's Ben Lloyd gave an illusion of the album being like a "journey through a number of different musical styles whilst retaining the Canadian band's use of worshipful lyrics." He continued his praise with the band has "a reputation for being one of the most thought provoking worship ministries serving the international Church and they retain their creative standards with this set." Jesus Freak Hideout's Jen Rose stated this album "marries elements of chamber pop, alternative rock, and even a touch of Americana folk for a sound more expansive than expected from a four-piece band. This isn't a highly upbeat record; with the exception of a few tracks, big ballads and serious moments dominate, but the building layers of sound are stirring. Words like "cinematic" or "theatrical" come to mind, but not in a cheesy, contrived sense." Rose gave credence the album was "something more powerful and memorable than the average CCM pop record. While it may be a slightly different sound from Downhere, it's a wonderful addition to their catalog that only gets better with more listens and could be a late summer sleeper hit." Jesus Freak Hideout's Alex "Tincan" Caldwell noted "the combination of clever musical choices and deeply poetic and thoughtful lyrics makes On The Altar Of Love one of the best releases of the year and earns Downhere another "A" on their report card." Louder Than the Music's Jono Davies said "this record is very strong because this is a band who can write catchy songs that are good enough for anybody of any genre to enjoy. Taking influences from many different artists makes this a varied album, but a varied album of songs that will get played again and again. I'm sure if you get this your whole family will enjoy it, if you like soft rock, indie, pop, big rock ballads, then this album is well worth thinking about." New Release Tuesday's Kevin Davis stated that "this album for me harnesses the best of what I’ve come to love about this band, sing-able melodies, songs filled with biblical truth and some of the best vocal combinations in any genre." Furthermore, he noted the album "includes some of their most profound lyrics and every single song will have you singing along in praise and worship to our Savior." Davis cautioned "don’t miss out on this gem, one of the absolute best albums of the year. All twelve songs are interesting, challenging and this is one of those profound listening experiences that you’ll want to experience again as soon as you’re finished." New Release Tuesday's IronJedi called the album "a sacrificial offering of love of the highest order."

== Track listing ==
All tracks are written by Jason Germain, Marc Martel.

| No. | Title | Length |
|---|---|---|
| 1. | "Only the Beginning" | 4:04 |
| 2. | "Rest" | 4:09 |
| 3. | "Let Me Rediscover You" | 4:00 |
| 4. | "For Life" | 3:57 |
| 5. | "Living the Dream" | 3:34 |
| 6. | "Seek" | 3:47 |
| 7. | "Glory by the Way of Shame" | 3:52 |
| 8. | "Holy" | 4:32 |
| 9. | "For the Heartbreak" | 3:30 |
| 10. | "Turn This Around" | 3:53 |
| 11. | "The Altar of Love" | 3:15 |
| 12. | "Reveal the Kingdom" | 4:33 |
| Total length: | | 47:06 |

== Charts ==
=== Album ===
| Chart (2011) | Peak positions |
|---|---|
| US Billboard Christian Albums | 19 |
| US Billboard Heatseekers Albums | 11 |

=== Singles ===
| Year | Single | Peak chart positions |
| Year | Single | US Christian |
|---|---|---|
| 2011 | "Let Me Rediscover You" | 35 |
| 2011 | "Rest" | Uncharted |
