= Sweetsalt =

- Origin: Lithuania
- Genres: Rock, Alternative
- Years active: 2006–present
- Members: Rokas Dobužinskas; Romanas Dzindzeleta; Vytautas Vansavičius; Mindaugas Stundžia
- Past members: Pijus Ganauskas; Šarūnas Dirsė; Jurgis Cicėnas
- Website: http://www.sweetsalt.lt/

Sweetsalt is a Lithuanian rock band formed in 2006 by lead vocalist Rokas Dobužinskas and lead guitarist Pijus Ganauskas. Soon after bassist Šarūnas Dirsė and drummer Jurgis Cicėnas joined, completing the line-up. The band quickly rose to fame, especially after winning Coca-Cola Soundwave contest in 2008, receiving a chance to perform in Coke Live Music Festival along with The Prodigy and Timbaland. The same year they also closed one of the biggest baltic music festivals Be2gether.

In 2009, Sweetsalt performed in various rock concerts and night clubs. However the band didn't show up in any major events and was quickly forgotten by the media. In 2010 the band reformed with the current composition and released their debut album Jie man sakė (They told me) in 2011.
