= Pulse of the Planet =

- Genre: Documentary
- Running time: 2 Minutes
- Country of origin: United States; Canada; South Africa; India
- Language: English
- Home station: Independently Syndicated; Armed Forces Network
- Hosted by: Jim Metzner Productions
- Created by: Jim Metzner
- Produced by: Jim Metzner
- Original release: September 23, 1989 – Present
- Audio format: MP3
- Sponsored by: Virginia Tech
- Website: http://www.pulseplanet.com/
- Podcast: http://pulseplanet.com/dailyprogram/

Pulse of the Planet is a syndicated daily American radio series produced by Jim Metzner, which highlights world cultures, environmental and scientific issues and discoveries. The program provides listeners with a two-minute audio snippet of the subject, blending interviews and topical ambience to bring lesser publicized themes to the mainstream. The series began on September 23, 1989 and continues through the present day. It is broadcast across 250 public and commercial radio stations around the world, including the Armed Forces Radio Network.

== Other Avenues ==
Since its launch in 1989, Pulse of the Planet has extended out from radio, into several other directions with the rise of the internet. In June 2009, Pulse of the Planet launched a Twitter account, linking to MP3 clips of the radio program on its web page with a short teaser of the topic.

The website expands on one story each month for its monthly features page, supplementing the original radio spot with additional text and photographs.
