= Article One (band) =

Canadian Christian rock band

- Origin: London, Ontario, Canada
- Genres: Christian rock, pop rock, CCM
- Years active: 2003–2011
- Labels: Inpop Records (2007–2010); EMI Japan
- Members: Nathan Piché; Matt Piché; Dave De Smit; Nolan Verner; Mark Laidman; Ian Koiter; Jason Tinnel

Article One was a Canadian Christian rock band from London, Ontario. Members were Nathan Piché (vocals, guitars, keyboards), his brother Matt Piché (violin, vocals), Dave De Smit (drums, vocals), Nolan Verner (bass guitar), Mark Laidman (bass guitar), Ian Koiter (bass guitar) and Jason Tinnel (bass guitar).

== Early years ==
Article One was founded in 2003 by Nathan Piché, Matt Piché, bassist Ian Koiter and drummer Dave De Smit. Nathan and Matt Piché were brought up in a musical household. Their parents were music teachers; their father was a touring Christian musician. Their sister is a classical guitarist. Matt started playing violin when he was five years old and Nathan started playing piano a year later. In 2000, the brothers released an album called The Piché Family. Koiter had already begun his musical career by working on an album by the Canadian rapper Shad.

== Name ==
The band was originally named Appertain Display. In 2006, they independently released an album under that name, then changed their moniker to Article One, after the first article of the Universal Declaration of Human Rights, which was featured by U2 on their Vertigo Tour. The declaration states that "All human beings are born free and equal in dignity and rights. They are endowed with reason and conscience and should act towards one another in a spirit of brotherhood."

== History ==
They were signed to Nashville's Inpop Records and, on May 8, 2007, released their debut album, AO, produced by Siegfried Meier. They played some concerts in the US, including one as the opener for Newsboys. During the production of this album, bassist Ian Koiter left the band and was replaced by Nolan Verner.

In 2008, they released a three-track EP called The Pharmacy. Verner departed and was replaced by Mark Laidman.

Their second album, Colors And Sounds, was released on May 27, 2008. This album was produced by Tedd T and was well received. A special edition of their second album was released in Japan and included the song "In No Time At All" from their debut album as a bonus track. By this time, bassist Ian Koiter had left the band and been replaced by Mark Laidman.

In 2010, still on Inpop, Article One released the six-track EP The One (I'm Fighting For). Then, on October 19, 2010, they independently released their last album, the 18-track Clarity, produced by Nathan Piché and the drummer Chris Brush. For this album, Mark Laidman was gone; bassist Nolan Verner returned.

On July 12, 2011, the band announced they had stopped touring and that they had amicably parted ways. Article One played their final show Wednesday June 15, 2011 at Highland Lakes Camp and Conference Center. It was also the first and last show of new bassist, Jason Tinnel.

== Discography ==
=== Albums ===
Year	Title	Label(s)
2003	Appertain Display EP	Independent
2003	Appertain Display	Independent
2006	AO	Independent
2007	AO	Inpop Records
2008	The Pharmacy EP	Inpop Records
2008	Colors and Sounds	Inpop Records
2008	Colors and Sounds (Japanese Special Edition)	EMI Japan
2010	The One (I'm Fighting For) EP	Inpop Records
2010	Clarity	Independent

=== Singles ===
Their song "Without You I'm Not Alright" reached the No. 8 on the U.S. Contemporary Christian Music chart in June 2008. "Taken By The Storm" climbed into the Top 10 on the U.S. Contemporary Christian Music chart.

Year	Title	Album
2008	Without You (I'm Not Alright)	Colors and Sounds
2008	Taken By the Storm	Colors and Sounds
2010	The One (I'm Fighting For)	The One (I'm Fighting For) EP

=== Songs on compilations ===
- Launch Inferno, "Slow Down" (CMC, 2007)
- YourMusicZone.com No. 1s, "Say It Again" (CMC, 2007)
- Canada Rocks, "Without You (I'm Not Alright)" (CMC, 2008)
- Sea to Sea: Christmas, "One Gift" (Lakeside, 2009)
- Now Hear This!: Discover New Music Winter 2010 Sampler, "Love You Tomorrow" (Sparrow, 2010)

=== Songs in gaming ===
- The song "I Love You More" off the Clarity album is used for the opening movie for the Japanese Otome game "OZMAFIA!!"; the song "Dare to Believe", off Colors and Sounds is used for "OZMAFIA!!"'s ending theme.

== Awards ==
GMA Canada Covenant Awards

- 2006 nominee, New Artist of the Year
- 2008 Pop/Contemporary Album of the Year: Colors and Sounds
- 2008 nominee, Pop/Contemporary Song of the Year: "Without You (I'm Not Alright)"

Juno Awards

- Colors and Sounds Nominee, Contemporary Christian/Gospel Album of the Year, Juno Awards of 2009
- Clarity, Nominee, Contemporary Christian/Gospel Album of the Year, Juno Awards of 2011

== Tours ==
Reign In Us Tour (USA And Canada) with Starfield 2009
Rock What You Got Tour (USA) with Superchick and Stellar Kart - Fall 2008
Newsboys GO Tour (USA) - Spring 2008
ShoutFest Tour (USA) - Fall 2007
