= Salvation Station =

Studio album by Newworldson
- Released: February 12, 2008
- Genre: CCM
- Length: 45 minutes
- Label: Inpop
- Producers: Newworldson and Justin Koop

Newworldson chronology
Salvation Station EP (2007)	Salvation Station (2008)	Newworldson (2010)

Professional ratings
Review scores
Source	Rating
Cross Rhythms	4.5/5 stars

Salvation Station is the second full-length studio album from Canadian CCM band Newworldson, released on February 12, 2008. Christianity Today voted Salvation Station number 3 on their list of Best Christian Albums of the year 2008. It was also selected as one of the twenty best albums of 2008 by Cross Rhythms. The album hit number 26 on Billboard magazines's Top Heatseekers chart in 2008, and 34 on the Top Christian Albums chart.

The album won the 2008 Gospel Music Association Canada Covenant Award for Folk/Roots Album Of The Year. It also received a nomination for Contemporary Christian/Gospel Album Of The Year at the Juno Awards of 2009.

All the songs were written by Joel Parisien, Mark Rogers, Richard Moore and Joshua Franklin Toal, except "Borderline", written by Joel Parisien, Mark Rogers, Richard Moore, Joshua Franklin Toal and Jonah Nadir Omowale. Salvation Station was preceded by a five track sampler that was sold at concerts prior to the album's release.

== Track listing ==
All tracks are written by Joel Parisien and Mark Rogers.

Album release
No.	Title	Length
1.	"Salvation Station"	3:27
2.	"Workin' Man"	3:49
3.	"Gimme"	3:10
4.	"Empty Heart"	3:01
5.	"Sweet Holy Spirit"	5:21
6.	"Babylon Is Gonna Fall"	4:54
7.	"Down from the Mountain"	4:10
8.	"Borderline"	4:22
9.	"City Bus Love Song"	2:14
10.	"Waitin' Till the Rapture Come"	5:10
11.	"Pledge of Allegiance"	5:54
Total length:		45:32

== Personnel ==
- Joel Parisien - organ, pianos, clavinet, vocals
- Josh Toal - guitars, vocals
- Rich Moore - upright bass, vocals
- Mark Rogers - drums, cymbals, percussion
- Andy Parisien - background vocal on "Waiting' Till The Rapture Come"
