= Downhere (1999 album) =

downhere (independent)

Studio album by downhere
- Released: 1999
- Recorded: 1998–1999
- Genre: Christian rock/modern rock
- Length: 48:46
- Label: Slyngshot Records

Downhere chronology
downhere (independent) (1999)	downhere (2001)

downhere (independent) is the only independent album release (Slyngshot Records/CMC Distribution) by Christian rock band downhere, before they were signed to a major record label (Word Records). At the time of this recording, all four members of the band were students at Briercrest Bible College in Caronport, Saskatchewan. Previous band member Tyson Manning played bass. Manning relinquished his position in the band upon signing with Word Records, so that he could complete his studies at Briercrest Bible College in Caronport, Saskatchewan.

The songs Larger Than Life, Raincoat, Breathing In, Reconcile, Calmer Of The Storm, & So Blue were rerecorded for their Word Records album downhere. Grown Man was rerecorded for a compilation album, "Win This War," and that version was later released on Downhere's B-sides album, Two at a Time: Sneak Peeks & B-Sides. Dusty Roads, Postcard, Maybe I Could Learn, Vertical, and Revive Me have not been released on any subsequent releases. Copies of their independent release are hard to find today due to it being out of print.

== Track listing ==
1. Larger Than Life - 4:28
2. Raincoat - 4:04
3. Breathing In - 3:44
4. Reconcile - 3:43
5. Calmer of the Storm - 4:16
6. Dusty Roads - 4:20
7. So Blue - 3:43
8. Grown Man - 3:59
9. Postcard - 3:00
10. Maybe I Could Learn - 5:06
11. Vertical - 4:23
12. Revive Me - 4:01
