= WOW Worship: Green =

Compilation album by Various artists
- Released: March 20, 2001
- Genre: Contemporary worship music

WOW Worship compilation albums chronology
WOW Worship: Orange (2000)	WOW Worship: Green (2001)	WOW Worship: Yellow (2003)

Professional ratings
Review scores
Source	Rating
AllMusic	3/5 stars

WOW Worship: Green is a compilation album of Christian music. It reached #78 on the Billboard 200 chart. The album was certified as gold in the US in 2002 by the Recording Industry Association of America (RIAA). It was certified as gold in Canada in 2003 by the Canadian Recording Industry Association (CRIA).

== Track listing ==
=== Disc one ===
1. "Rise Up and Praise Him"
  - written by Paul Baloche and Gary Sadler
  - performed by The Women of Faith Worship Team from Integrity Music
  - from Outrageous Joy, released 1999-01-26
  - live recording from 04/01/1998 at Nashville Arena, Nashville, Tennessee, USA
2. "All Things Are Possible"
  - written by Darlene Zschech
  - performed by Darlene Zschech
  - from Shout to the Lord 2000, released 1998-12-29
  - live recording from 07/06/1998-07/19/1998 at State Sports Centre, Sydney Olympic Park, New South Wales, Australia
3. "Trading My Sorrows"
  - written by Darrell Evans
  - performed by Darrell Evans
  - from Only God for Me, released 1999-06-29
  - live recording from 1998 at Integrity Songwriter Summit, Mobile, Alabama, USA
4. "Every Move I Make"
  - written by David Ruis
  - performed by David Ruis
  - from Touching the Father's Heart, released 1997-01-02
  - live recording from Jubilee Place, Winnipeg, Manitoba, Canada
5. "That's Why We Praise Him"
  - written by Tommy Walker
  - performed by Rich Ochoa and the Maranatha! Promise Band
  - from PK2000 - Go the Distance, released 2000-09-12
  - live recording at Calvary Chapel, Costa Mesa, California, USA
6. "We Fall Down"
  - written by Chris Tomlin
  - performed by The Passion Worship Band
  - from Passion: Live Worship from the 286 Generation, released 1998-07-20
  - live recording from 01/01/1998-01/04/1998 at Austin Convention Center, Austin, Texas, USA
7. "Unashamed Love"
  - written by Lamont Hierbert
  - performed by Ten Shekel Shirt
  - from Much, released 2001-04-03
8. "He Knows My Name"
  - written by Tommy Walker
  - performed by Peter Shambrook
  - from Dry Bones Dancing, released 1997-12-07
9. "Hallelujah" (Your Love Is Amazing)
  - written by Brenton Brown and Brian Doerksen
  - performed by Brenton Brown
  - from Surrender, released 2000-10-01
10. "Lord Reign in Me"
  - written by Brenton Brown
  - performed by Brenton Brown
  - from Winds of Worship #12 - Live from London, released 1998
  - live recording from 02/22/1998 at Elliot School Auditorium, Putney, London Borough of Wandsworth, London, Greater London, England, United Kingdom
11. "My Redeemer Lives"
  - written by Reuben Morgan
  - performed by Darlene Zschech
  - from Shout to the Lord 2000, released 1998-12-29
  - live recording from 07/06/1998-07/19/1998 at State Sports Centre, Sydney Olympic Park, New South Wales, Australia
12. "Fuel"
  - written by Tom Wuest
  - performed by Analogue
  - from Fuel, released 2001-09-11
13. "You're Worthy of My Praise"
  - written by David Ruis
  - performed by The Praise Band
  - from Praise Band 9 - Forever, released 1999-11-09
  - live recording from Calvary Chapel, Costa Mesa, California, USA
14. "Breathe"
  - written by Marie Barnett
  - performed by Kathryn Scott
  - from Hungry, released 1999-03-01
  - live recording from Elliot School Auditorium, Putney, London Borough of Wandsworth, London, Greater London, England, United Kingdom
15. "Agnus Dei"
  - written by Michael W. Smith
  - performed by Charlie Hall and The Passion Worship Band
  - from Passion: Better Is One Day, released 2000-03-14
  - live recording from 01/01/1999-01/04/1999 at Fort Worth Convention Center, Fort Worth, Texas, USA
16. "Shout to the North"
  - written by Martin Smith
  - performed by Delirious?
  - from Cutting Edge, released 1995-05-15

=== Disc two ===
1. "The Doxology"
  - written by Ken Thomas, new bridge by Tommy Walker
  - performed by Tommy Walker and the Maranatha! Promise Band
  - from PK2000 - Go the Distance, released 2000-09-12
  - live recording at Calvary Chapel Costa Mesa, California, United States
2. "He Is Exalted"
  - written by Twila Paris
  - performed by Twila Paris
  - from Kingdom Seekers, released 1985-09-25
3. "Hosanna"
  - written by Carl Tuttle
  - performed by Carl Tuttle
  - from Change My Heart Oh God, released 1996-08-20
  - live recording
4. "Cry of My Heart"
  - written by Terry Butler
  - performed by Terry Butler
  - from Change My Heart Oh God Vol. 2, released 1997-04-22
  - live recording at The Group of Project Studios, Vancouver, British Columbia, Canada
5. "Good to Me"
  - written by Craig Musseau
  - performed by Brian Doerksen
  - from Change My Heart Oh God Vol. 2, released 1997-04-22
  - live recording at The Group of Project Studios, Vancouver, British Columbia, Canada
6. "The Power of Your Love"
  - written by Geoff Bullock
  - performed by Darlene Zschech
  - from Shout to the Lord, released 1996-04-30
  - live recording from 01/01/1996 at Hills Christian Life Centre, Baulkham Hills, New South Wales, Australia (later Hillsong)
7. "Awesome in This Place"
  - written by Dave Billington
  - performed by Gary Sadler and Kelly Willard
  - from Thy Word, released 1994
8. " I Worship You Almighty God"
  - written by Sondra Corbett Wood
  - performed by Lisa Glasgow
  - from Celebrate Jesus, released 2000-01-25
9. "Seek Ye First"
  - written by Karen Lafferty
  - performed by The Maranatha! Singers
  - from Praise 1 - The Praise Album, released 1999-08-23
10. "Jesus, Draw Me Close"
  - written by Rick Founds
  - performed by Anne Barbour
  - from The Silver Anniversary Project, released 1998-11-03
11. "Great Is the Lord"
  - written by Michael W. Smith and Deborah Smith
  - performed by Michael W. Smith
  - from Michael W. Smith Project, released 1983-02-08
12. "Think About His Love"
  - written by Walt Harrah
  - performed by Don Moen
  - from God for Us, released 1998-06-02
13. "Draw Me Close"
  - written by Kelly Carpenter
  - performed by Andy Park
  - from Change My Heart Oh God Vol. 2, released 1997-04-22
  - live recording at The Project Group of Studios, Greater Vancouver, British Columbia, Canada
14. "This Is Love"
  - written by Terry Butler and Mike Young
  - performed by Scott Underwood
  - from Why We Worship: Intimacy, released 1998-12-22
15. "Worthy, You Are Worthy"
  - written by Don Moen
  - performed by Don Moen
  - from Give Thanks, released 1986
  - live recording at Covenant Church, Mobile, Alabama, United States
16. "Come Just As You Are"
  - written by Joseph Sabolick
  - performed by Terry Clark and the Maranatha! Promise Band
  - from PK2000 - Go the Distance, released 2000-09-12
  - live recording at Calvary Chapel Costa Mesa in California, United States
17. "To Him Who Sits on the Throne"
  - written by Debbye Graafsma
  - performed by Kelly Willard
  - from My Heart Rejoices, released 1995-10-31

== Certifications ==
Region	Certification	Certified units/sales
Canada (Music Canada)	Gold	50,000^{^}
United States (RIAA)	Gold	500,000^{^}
^{^} Shipments figures based on certification alone.
