= A Greater Song =

Live album by Paul Baloche
- Released: April 4, 2006
- Recorded: Community Christian Fellowship (Lindale, Texas)
- Genre: Contemporary Christian music, gospel music
- Length: 57:49
- Label: Integrity Music
- Producer: Paul Baloche, Austin Deptula, Don Moen (executive producer)

Paul Baloche chronology
God of Wonders (2001)	A Greater Song (2006)	Our God Saves (2007)

Professional ratings
Review scores
Source	Rating
Jesus Freak Hideout	4.5/5 stars
Cross Rhythms	9/10 stars

A Greater Song is a live album by Paul Baloche released in 2006. The album was recorded at Community Christian Fellowship in Lindale, Texas, where he served as the Worship Pastor at the time. The album features Kathryn Scott on three of the songs. Baloche co-wrote the songs on the album with songwriters such as Sara Groves, Graham Kendrick, Glenn Packiam, Don Moen, Brenton Brown, and Matt Redman.

== Track listing ==
1. "Hosanna (Praise Is Rising)" (Paul Baloche, Brenton Brown) – 6:44
2. "Because of Your Love" (Baloche, Brown) – 4:05
3. "A Greater Song" (Baloche, Matt Redman) – 6:50
4. "I Will Boast" (Baloche) – 5:20
5. "Your Name" (Glenn Packiam) – 5:44
6. "What Can I Do" (Baloche, Graham Kendrick) – 5:19
7. "You Have Been So Good" (Baloche, Sara Groves) – 4:00
8. "Thank You Lord" (Baloche, Don Moen) – 4:03
9. "Creation's King" (Baloche, Kendrick) – 4:39
10. "Here and Now" (Baloche, Brown) – 5:13
11. "Just as I Am" (Traditional) – 1:04
12. "Rising" (Baloche, Redman) – 4:48

== Personnel ==
- Paul Baloche – lead vocals, acoustic guitars, electric guitars
- Chris Springer – acoustic piano, keyboards, Hammond B3 organ
- Gary Leach – acoustic piano (7)
- Austin Deptula – programming, loops, strings
- Ben Gowell – acoustic guitars, electric guitars
- Milo Deering – dobro, mandolin, violin
- Don Harris – electric bass, fretless bass
- Carl Albrecht – drums, percussion
- Ty Young – cello
- David Baloche – French horn, backing vocals
- Rita Baloche – backing vocals
- Michael Mellett – backing vocals
- Kathryn Scott – vocal soloist (5, 10, 11)
- Sara Groves – lead vocals (7)

=== Production ===
- Don Moen – executive producer
- Chris Springer – A&R
- Paul Baloche – producer
- Austin Deptula – producer, engineer
- F. Reid Shippen – mixing
- Richard Dodd – mastering
- Riordan Design Group, Inc. – design
- Joshua Dunford – photography
