= Our God Saves =

Studio album by Paul Baloche
- Released: September 18, 2007
- Studio: Rosewood Studios (Tyler, Texas); Community Christian Fellowship (Lindale, Texas); Squeakystreet Studios (Malibu, California); Bayside Church (Sacramento, California); Wholetone Productions (Monument, Colorado); Esselle Studios (Brighton, England, UK); Upstream Studios (Portstewart, Ireland)
- Genre: Contemporary Christian music
- Length: 1:07:18
- Label: Integrity Media
- Producer: Paul Baloche; Austin Deptula

Paul Baloche chronology
A Greater Song (2006)	Our God Saves (2007)	The Writer's Collection (2008)

Professional ratings
Review scores
Source	Rating
Allmusic	3.5/5 stars

Our God Saves is Paul Baloche's seventh studio album, released in 2007.

== Track listing ==
No.	Title	Writer(s)	Length
1.	"Our God Saves"	Paul Baloche, Brenton Brown	5:02
2.	"The Kingdom of God"	Paul Baloche, Kari Jobe, Mia Fieldes	4:22
3.	"Rock of Ages You Will Stand"	Paul Baloche, Brenton Brown	4:46
4.	"Only True God" (featuring Kathryn Scott)	Paul Baloche, Kathryn Scott	4:37
5.	"Prayer"		1:20
6.	"Hallelujah to My King" (featuring Brenton Brown)	Paul Baloche, Brenton Brown	5:12
7.	"I Cling to the Cross" (featuring Matt Redman)	Paul Baloche, Beth Redman	5:30
8.	"You Gave Your Life Away" (featuring Rita Baloche)	Paul Baloche, Kathryn Scott	5:23
9.	"Praise"	Vanessa Brown	4:04
10.	"The Way" (featuring Lincoln Brewster)	Paul Baloche	4:03
11.	"God Most High" (featuring Glenn Packiam)	Paul Baloche, Glenn Packiam	4:30
12.	"How Great Thou Art"	Traditional	4:57
13.	"Great Redeemer"	Paul Baloche	4:11
14.	"Your Love Came Down"	Paul Baloche, Rita Baloche	6:49

== Personnel ==
- Paul Baloche – lead vocals, acoustic guitars
- Chris Springer – acoustic piano, keyboards
- Ari Heinekanen – Fender Rhodes, Hammond B3 organ
- Austin Deptula – programming, loops, strings
- Ben Gowell – electric guitars, mandolin
- Don Harris – bass
- Carl Albrecht – drums, percussion
- Rita Baloche – backing vocals, lead vocals (8)
- David Baloche – backing vocals (1, 8, 3, 14)
- Perry Coleman – backing vocals (2–7, 9–12)
- Kathryn Scott – lead vocals (4)
- Pastor Martin Sempa – prayer (5)
- Brenton Brown – lead vocals (6)
- Matt Redman – lead vocals (7)
- Lincoln Brewster – lead vocals (10)
- Glenn Packiam – lead vocals (11)

=== Production ===
- Don Moen – executive producer
- Chris Springer – A&R
- Paul Baloche – producer
- Austin Deptula – producer, recording, mixing
- Greg Hunt – recording
- Gary Leach – recording
- Brenton Brown – additional recording
- Lincoln Brewster – additional recording
- Matthew Fallentine – additional recording
- Trevor Michael – additional recording
- Roy Rainey – additional recording
- Doug Sax – mastering
- Sangwook Nam – mastering
- The Mastering Lab (Hollywood, California) – mastering location
- Frank Dejong – production coordinator
- Markus Frehner – art direction, design
- Jimmy Abegg – photography
