= WOW Worship: Orange =

WOW Worship Orange

Compilation album by Various artists
- Released: March 28, 2000
- Genre: CWM

WOW Worship compilation albums chronology
WOW Worship: Blue (1999)	WOW Worship Orange (2000)	WOW Worship: Green (2001)

Professional ratings
Review scores
Source	Rating
Allmusic	3/5 stars

WOW Worship: Orange is a compilation CD of Christian Music in the WOW Worship series. It reached No. 65 on the Billboard 200 chart. WOW Worship: Orange was certified as platinum in sales in 2001 by the Recording Industry Association of America (RIAA). The album was certified as gold in Canada in 2001 by the Canadian Recording Industry Association (CRIA).

WOW Worship: Orange was known as WOW Worship, Vol. 2 when first released. Albums in this series were not known by their cover colors until the release of WOW Worship: Green in 2001.

== Track listing ==
=== Disc One (Orange) ===
1. "Did You Feel/Mountains Tremble" – Delirious?
  - recorded at West Park Studios in Littlehampton, England
2. "Light the Fire Again" – Brian Doerksen
  - recorded in Brentwood, Tennessee
3. "Rock of Ages" – Praise Band
  - recorded at Calvary Chapel Costa Mesa
4. "Hungry" (Falling On My Knees) – Kathryn Scott
  - recorded in Hull, England
5. "Better Is One Day" – Charlie Hall
  - recorded at West Park Studios in Littlehampton, England
6. "In That Day" – Praise Band
  - recorded at Calvary Chapel in Costa Mesa, California
7. "We Want To See Jesus Lifted High" – Noel Richards
  - recorded in Colorado Springs, Colorado
8. "Worship You" – Jami Smith
  - recorded in Brentwood, Tennessee
9. "In the Secret" – Sonicflood
  - recorded in Nashville, Tennessee
10. "I Walk By Faith" – Chris Falson (sung by Praise Band)
  - recorded in Calvary Chapel in Costa Mesa, California
11. "Redeemer Savior Friend" – Darrell Evans and Chris Springer (sung by Dave Brooks)
  - recorded in Brentwood, Tennessee
12. "Jesus, Lover of My Soul" – Darlene Zschech
  - recorded at Hills Centre in Castle Hill, Australia
13. "You Are God" – Scott Underwood
  - recorded at Vineyard Church of Anaheim in Anaheim, California
14. "We Will Dance" – David Ruis
  - recorded in Brentwood, Tennessee
15. "I Will Not Forget You" – Praise Band
  - recorded in Calvary Chapel in Costa Mesa, California

=== Disc Two (Cyan) ===
1. Victory Chant – Joseph Vogels (sung by Bob Fitts)
  - recorded at Calvary Chapel Costa Mesa
2. I Will Celebrate – The Maranatha! Singers
3. Celebrate Jesus – The Alleluia Singers (featuring Don Moen)
  - recorded in Colorado Springs, Colorado
4. I Believe in Jesus – Keith Matten
  - recorded in Brentwood, Tennessee
5. Holy and Anointed One – Randy Butler
6. He Is Able – Praise Band
  - recorded at Calvary Chapel Costa Mesa
7. Above All – Paul Baloche (sung by Lenny LeBlanc)
  - recorded at Harvest Church in Riverside, California
8. I See the Lord – Chris Falson
  - recorded in Capistrano Beach, Dana Point, California
9. Awesome God – Praise Band
  - recorded at Calvary Chapel Costa Mesa
10. God Is Good All the Time – Don Moen
  - recorded in Colorado Springs, Colorado
11. Shine Jesus Shine – Graham Kendrick
  - recorded at ICC Studios in Eastbourne, England
12. Jesus Is Alive – Ron Kenoly
  - recorded at Jubilee Christian Center in San Jose, California
13. God Will Make A Way – Don Moen
  - recorded at North Heights Lutheran Church in Arden Hills, Minnesota
14. As the Deer – Martin J. Nystrom (sung by The Maranatha! Singers)
  - recorded at Calvary Chapel Costa Mesa
15. Glorify Thy Name – Donna Adkins (sung by The Maranatha! Singers)
  - recorded in Brentwood, Tennessee
16. When I Look Into Your Holiness – Wayne and Cathy Perrin (sung by Kent Henry)
  - recorded in Mobile, Alabama
17. There Is None Like You – Lenny LeBlanc
  - recorded in Colorado Springs, Colorado
18. Holy Ground – Geron Davis
  - recorded in Colorado Springs, Colorado

== Certifications ==
Region	Certification	Certified units/sales
Canada (Music Canada)	Gold	50,000^{^}
United States (RIAA)	Platinum	1,000,000^{^}
^{^} Shipments figures based on certification alone.
