= Christmas Worship =

Studio album by Paul Baloche
- Released: October 28, 2013
- Genre: Worship, CCM, gospel
- Length: 52:26
- Label: Integrity
- Producer: Paul Baloche, Ben Gowell, Michael Rossback

Paul Baloche chronology
The Same Love (2012)	Christmas Worship (2013)	Live (2014)

Christmas Worship is the first Christmas album from Paul Baloche. Integrity Music released the album on October 28, 2013. Baloche released a follow-up to this album, Christmas Worship, Vol. 2 in 2015.

== Critical reception ==
Professional ratings
Review scores
Source	Rating
CCM Magazine	4/5 stars
Cross Rhythms	7/10 squares

Awarding the album four stars at CCM Magazine, Grace Aspinwall states, "the heart of this album lies in its gorgeous arrangements." Lins Honeyman, giving the album a seven out of ten for Cross Rhythms, writes, "a varied release that pushes Christmas music forward whilst acknowledging the genre's glorious past." Reviewing the album from AllMusic, Thom Jurek says, "a collection of (mostly) traditional carols and hymns with worship choruses and cadenzas woven in for maximum effect."

== Track listing ==
No.	Title	Writer(s)	Length
1.	"Hark the Herald Angels Sing/King of Heaven" (featuring All Sons & Daughters)	Paul Baloche, Jason Ingram, Felix Mendelssohn, Charles Wesley	5:14
2.	"O Come All Ye Faithful/We Adore You"	Baloche, Tim Janis, Frederick Oakeley, John Francis Wade	3:50
3.	"Angels [Instrumental]"		0:54
4.	"Angels We Have Heard On High (Deo)"	Baloche	4:02
5.	"Christmas Offering" (featuring Onaje Jefferson)	Baloche	4:50
6.	"This Is Love" (featuring Kathryn Scott)	Baloche, Kathryn Scott	5:01
7.	"Follow That Star" (featuring Aaron Shust)	Rita Baloche	3:47
8.	"Your Name [Christmas Version]" (featuring Brooke Williams)	Baloche, Glenn Packiam	4:38
9.	"O Come Emmanuel"	Baloche, R. Baloche	4:47
10.	"Joy To the World/Shout For Joy"	Baloche, Lincoln Brewster, George Frederick Handel, Ingram, Isaac Watts	5:22
11.	"Prepare Him Room" (featuring Jennifer Holm)	Baloche	4:53
12.	"What Can I Do [Christmas Version]"	Baloche, Graham Kendrick	5:08
Total length:			52:26

== Personnel ==
=== Musicians ===
- Paul Baloche – lead vocals, acoustic guitar
- John Ardnt – keyboards, strings, string arrangements
- Chris Springer – keyboards, organ
- Michael Marshall – acoustic piano
- Ben Gowell – keyboards, programming, acoustic guitar, baritone guitar, mandolin
- Michael Rossback – keyboards, programming, electric guitars, mandolin, bass, percussion, glockenspiel, trumpet
- Aaron Fabrinni – pedal steel guitar
- Carl Albrecht – drums, percussion
- Daniel Grothe – drums, percussion
- David Baloche – trumpet, French horn
- Rita Baloche – backing vocals, vocal arrangements
- Ben Clark – backing vocals
- Joel Hebert – backing vocals
- Jennifer Holm – backing vocals, lead vocals (11)
- Austin Johnson – backing vocals
- Dani Rocca-Hebert – backing vocals
- Brooke Williams – backing vocals, lead vocals (8)
- All Sons & Daughters – lead vocals (1)
- Trinity Christian Center Choir – choir (2, 5, 12)
- Kareem Riley – choir director (2, 5, 12)
- Onajé Jefferson – lead vocals (5)
- Kathryn Scott – lead vocals (6)
- Aaron Shust – lead vocals (7)

=== Production ===
- C. Ryan Durham – executive producer
- Paul Baloche – producer
- Ben Gowell – producer, engineer
- Michael Rossback – producer, engineer
- David Baloche – engineer
- Gary Leach – engineer
- F. Reid Shippen – mixing at Robot Lemon (Nashville, Tennessee)
- Paul "Paco" Cossette – mix assistant
- Andrew Mendelson – mastering at Georgetown Masters (Nashville, Tennessee)
- Becca Nicolson – production coordinator
- Thom Hoyman – creative director, design

== Chart performance ==
Chart (2013)	Peak position
US Billboard 200	197
US Christian Albums (Billboard)	10
