= Holy God =

Studio album by Brian Doerksen
- Released: March 6, 2007
- Recorded: 2006
- Genre: Contemporary worship
- Length: 63:23
- Label: Integrity Music
- Producer: Philip Janz

Brian Doerksen chronology
| Today (2005) | Holy God (2007) | Come Now Is the Time to Worship - EP (2007) |

Singles from Holy God
- 1. "Light the Fire Again" Released: January 19, 2007

Professional ratings
Review scores
| Source | Rating |
|---|---|
| Christian Music Today | 3.5/5 stars |

Holy God is the fourth major album and first studio album by Brian Doerksen released on the Integrity Music label. It was released on March 6, 2007. In 2008, the album was honored as "Contemporary Christian/Gospel Album" of the year by the JUNO Awards.

== Track listing ==
1. "Invocation" - 0:36
2. "Our Father In Heaven" - 5:21
3. "Holy God" - 6:51
4. "Return To Me" - 1:07
5. "Song For The Bride" - 3:23
6. "He Is Here" - 4:07
7. "Light the Fire Again" - 5:55
8. "Hear Us Call" - 5:39
9. "I Don't Need Anything But You" - 3:56
10. "Change Me On The Inside" - 4:23
11. "Show Me Your Way" - 2:32
12. "Trinity" - 2:42
13. "Be Unto Your Name/ Holy Holy Holy" - 5:29
14. "Triune God" - 5:53
15. "You Are My Home" - 4:41
16. "Your Love Will Find Me" - 4:08

== Track Performers and Writers ==
Holy God lists the following song writing credits:

| Song | Songwriter | Performer |
|---|---|---|
| Invocation | Arranged by Philip Janz | Strings directed by Calvin Dyck |
| Our Father In Heaven | Brian Doerksen | Brian Doerksen |
| Holy God | Brian Doerksen | Brian Doerksen |
| Return To me | Brian Doerksen | Brian Doerksen |
| Song For The Bride | Brian Doerksen | Brian Doerksen |
| He Is Here | Paul Baloche and Brian Doerksen | Brian Doerksen and Christine Dente |
| Light The Fire Again | Brian Doerksen | Brian Doerksen |
| Hear Us Call | Dave Hensman and Philip Janz | Brian Doerksen |
| I Don't Need Anything But You | Brian Doerksen | Brian Doerksen and David Kahiapo |
| Change Me On The Inside | Brian Doerksen | Brian Doerksen and Joseph Williams |
| Show Me Your Way | Brian Doerksen | Brian Doerksen |
| Trinity | Arranged by Larry Nickel | Directed by Larry Nickel |
| Be Unto Your Name | Lynn Deshazo and Gary Sadler | Brian Doerksen and Debbie Fortnum |
| Holy Holy Holy | Reginald Heber and John B. Dykes | Brian Doerksen and Debbie Fortnum |
| Triune God | Brenton Brown and Brian Doerksen | Brian Doerksen |
| You Are My Home | Brian Doerksen | Brian Doerksen and Philip Janz |
| Your Love Will Find Me | Brian Doerksen and Steve Mitchinson | Brian Doerksen and Loralee Thiessen |
