= Trading My Sorrows =

Trading My Sorrows: The Best of Darrell Evans

Studio album by Darrell Evans
- Released: 2002
- Genre: Worship music
- Label: Vertical Music
- Producer: Paul Mills and Jeff Quimby; Don Moen and Chris Thomason (executive producers)

Darrell Evans chronology
All I Want is You (2001)	Trading My Sorrows: The Best of Darrell Evans (2002)	Consuming Fire (2004)

Trading My Sorrows: The Best of Darrell Evans is a compilation of Christian worship music by Darrell Evans released in 2002.

== Track listing ==
1. "Fields of Grace (live)" (Darrell Evans) - from All I Want Is You
2. "Freedom" (Evans) - from Freedom
3. "All We Want Is You" (Evans) - from All I Want Is You
4. "New Song Arisin'" (Evans) - from You Are I AM
5. "We Will Embrace Your Move" (Evans) - from You Are I AM
6. "Let the River Flow" (Evans) - from You Are I AM
7. "My Home is You (live)" (Evans) - from All I Want Is You
8. "You Bless Me" (Evans and Ben Ferrell) - from Freedom
9. "So Good to Me" (Evans and Matt Jones) - from Freedom
10. "Trading My Sorrows" (Evans) - from Freedom
11. "Down at Your Feet" (Evans) - from All I Want Is You
12. "Your Love Is Extravagant" (Evans) - from Freedom
13. "Whom Shall I Fear" (Evans) - from You Are I AM
14. "I Am Yours" (Evans) - from You Are I AM
15. "Lay My Life Down (live)" (Evans) - from All I Want Is You
