= Live (Paul Baloche album) =

Live album by Paul Baloche
- Released: April 1, 2014
- Genre: Worship
- Length: 62:03
- Label: Integrity
- Producer: Michael Rossback

Paul Baloche chronology
Christmas Worship (2013)	Live (2014)	Christmas Worship, Vol. 2 (2015)

Live is a live album from Paul Baloche. Integrity Music released the album on April 1, 2014.

== Critical reception ==
Professional ratings
Review scores
Source	Rating
365 Days of Inspiring Media	3.5/5 stars
CCM Magazine	3/5 stars
Christian Music Review	5/5 stars
The Christian Music Review Blog	4/5 stars
Louder Than the Music	4.5/5 stars
New Release Today	4/5 stars
Worship Leader	5/5 stars

Awarding the album three stars at CCM Magazine, Grace Aspinwall states, "not as creative; but, overall, the project is uplifting and the recording is clear and wellarranged." Amanda Furbeck, giving the album five stars from Worship Leader, writes, "this album reveals the beauty and authenticity of a worshipping congregation." Rating the album four stars by New Release Today, Kevin Davis says, "you need to add Live to your worship music collection." Jonathan Andre, signaling in a three and a half star review for 365 Days of Inspiring Media, describes, "Paul still delivers a powerful set list, and one that’ll always showcase some of the most underrated songs within CCM worship industry right now." Indicating in a five star review at Christian Music Review, Jay Heilman replies, "Live...further cements himself in the upper echelon of worship artists whose sole aim is to worship alongside us lifting up the name of Christ." Jono Davies, assigning the album four and a half stars from Louder Than the Music, responds, "the heart of the album is all about pointing the listener to Jesus, and these songs do that with style, passion and heartfelt singing." Allocating a four star review for the album from The Christian Music Review Blog, recognizes, "it's a good album...Might have been better as an EP – strip it down to the best 5 songs, because several of them start to blend together too much."

== Awards and accolades ==
This album was No. 6 on the Worship Leader's Top 20 Albums of 2014 list.

The song, "You Lift Us Up", was No. 7 on the Worship Leader's Top 20 Songs of 2014 list.

== Track listing ==
No.	Title	Writer(s)	Length
1.	"Our God Saves"	Paul Baloche, Brenton Brown	5:29
2.	"God My Rock"	Baloche, Brown	5:12
3.	"You Lift Us Up"	Baloche, Matt Maher	4:34
4.	"The Same Love"	Baloche, Michael Rossback	6:26
5.	"Jesus Be My Savior"	Baloche, Brown	4:30
6.	"Mighty Fortress"	Baloche, Aaron Shust	5:27
7.	"My Hope"	Baloche, Ed Kerr, Alyssa Mellinger, Sheila Rabe	5:47
8.	"Hosanna (Praise Is Rising)"	Baloche, Brown	6:15
9.	"Today is the Day"	Baloche, Lincoln Brewster	4:57
10.	"He Is Risen"	Baloche, Graham Kendrick	5:05
11.	"Glorious/Holy Holy"	Baloche, Brown	8:21
Total length:			62:03

== Personnel ==
=== Musicians ===
- Paul Baloche – lead vocals, acoustic guitar
- Chris Springer – keyboards, organ
- Brad Towes – keyboards, organ
- Michael Rossback – keyboards, guitars, electric bass, backing vocals
- Ben Gowell – electric guitars
- Carl Albrecht – drums, percussion
- Silvia Buttiglione – cello
- Mary Lindsey – cello
- Heather Land – backing vocals
- Brooke Williams – backing vocals
- Joel Auge – guest vocals
- Harvest Bible Chapel Choir – choir
- Joshua Seller – choir director
- Jen Cole, Erica D., Ruth Dowdell, Jameson Everden, David Jacob, Dan McCaulay, Melody McKay, Bahy Mehany, Joshua Seller, Greg Sykes and Christophe Vacher – additional vocals

=== Production ===
- C. Ryan Denham – executive producer
- Michael Rossback – producer, engineer, mixing
- Jeoff Harris – engineer
- Darryl Kingdon – assistant engineer
- Steve Pauls – choir engineer
- Andrew Mendelson – mastering at Georgetown Masters (Nashville, Tennessee)
- Becca Nicolson – production coordinator
- Thom Hoyman – art direction, design
- Jeff Andrews – photography

Stage and Technical credits

- Frank Dejong – event coordinator, administrator
- Matt Browning – post-production, video editing, authoring
- John Willis – FOH engineer
- Steve Pauls – lighting director
- Natasha Boshoff, Arley McBlain, Kent McGilvary and Priscilla Yuen – cameramen
