= WOW Worship: Blue =

Compilation album by Various artists
- Released: June 15, 1999
- Genre: CWM

WOW Worship compilation albums chronology
WOW Worship: Blue (1999)	WOW Worship: Orange (2000)

Professional ratings
Review scores
Source	Rating
Allmusic	3/5 stars

WOW Worship: Blue was the first album in the WOW Worship series of compilation albums. It reached #70 on the Billboard 200 chart in 1999, and #1 on the Top Contemporary Christian chart. In the following year it reached #144 on the Billboard 200, and #2 on the Top Contemporary Christian chart. The album was certified as double platinum in the United States in 2001 by the Recording Industry Association of America (RIAA). In Canada the album was certified as platinum in 2002 by the Canadian Recording Industry Association (CRIA).

This album was known simply as WOW Worship when first released. Albums in this series were not known by their cover colors until the release of WOW Worship: Green in 2001.

The 2007 multi-platinum special reissue included a third bonus CD with eleven songs.

== Track listing ==
=== Yellow Disc [Disc 1] ===
1. "The River Is Here" – Andy Park
2. "Ancient Of Days" – Jamie Harvill & Gary Sadler (sung by Ron Kenoly)
3. "Let It Rise" – Holland Davis (sung by Paul Baloche)
4. "Let The River Flow" – Darrell Evans (sung by Lindell Cooley)
5. "Change My Heart Oh God" – Eddie Espinosa (sung by Roby Duke)
  - recorded in Brentwood, Tennessee
6. "The Heart Of Worship" – Matt Redman
7. "Shout to the Lord" – Darlene Zschech
  - recorded in Sydney, Australia
8. "Open The Eyes Of My Heart" – Paul Baloche
9. "Refiner's Fire" – Brian Doerksen
  - recorded in Brentwood, Tennessee
10. "Blessed Be The Name Of The Lord" – Don Moen
11. "I Love You Lord" – Laurie Klein (sung by Kristina Hamilton)
12. "Father I Adore You" – Terrye Coelho Strom (sung by The Maranatha! Singers)
  - recorded at Calvary Chapel Costa Mesa, California
13. "In His Time" – Diane Ball (sung by Jack Searle)
  - recorded at Calvary Chapel Costa Mesa, California
14. "Give Thanks" – Henry Smith (sung by Don Moen)
15. "Come Into His Presence" – Lynn Baird (sung by Don Moen)

=== Blue Disc [Disc 2] ===
1. "Lord, I Lift Your Name on High" – Rick Founds (sung by The Maranatha! Singers)
2. "My Life Is In You, Lord" – Daniel Gardner (sung by Joseph Garlington)
  - recorded in Mobile, Alabama
3. "Mighty Is Our God" – Eugene Greco (sung by Chris Rodriguez)
  - recorded in Brentwood, Tennessee
4. "We Will Embrace Your Move" – Darrell Evans
5. "I Will Celebrate" – Linda Duvall (sung by Gene Miller)
6. "Blessed Be The Lord God Almighty" – Bob Fitts (sung by Kelly Willard)
7. "Come Let Us Worship And Bow Down" – Dave Doherty (sung by Rob Mathes)
  - recorded at Calvary Chapel Costa Mesa, California
8. "Jesus Name Above All Names" – Naida Hearn (sung by Bill Batstone)
9. "Come, Now Is The Time To Worship" – Brian Doerksen featuring Wendy Whitehead
10. "Take My Life" – Scott Underwood
11. "More Love More Power" – Jude Del Hierro (sung by Keith Matten)
  - recorded in Brentwood, Tennessee
12. "Isn't He" – John Wimber (sung by Terry Clark)
  - recorded in Brentwood, Tennessee
13. "More Precious Than Silver" – Lynn DeShazo (sung by Leanne Albrecht)
14. "Open Our Eyes" – Bob Cull (sung by Teri DeSario)
15. "I Could Sing Of Your Love Forever" – Martin Smith (Delirious?)
  - recorded in Littlehampton, England

=== Bonus Disc [Disc 3] ===
There is a bonus third disc that is only included with the 2007 reissue.

1. "Majestic" – Lincoln Brewster
2. "Unto The One" – Matt Papa
3. "Revelation Song" – Gateway Worship
4. "Hear Us From Heaven" – Jared Anderson
5. "All Things" – Jeremy Scott
6. "My Savior Lives" – New Life Worship
7. "God Of All Splendor" – Robbie Reider
8. "Bless His Name" – Robbie Reider and Casey Corum
9. "If You Say Go" – Rita Springer
10. "Unfailing Love" – Nigel Briggs & TRENT
11. "Almighty God" – Joel Engle

== Certifications ==
Region	Certification	Certified units/sales
Canada (Music Canada)	Platinum	100,000^{^}
United States (RIAA)	2× Platinum	2,000,000^{^}
^{^} Shipments figures based on certification alone.
