= Vineyard Records UK =

- Official Logo
- Founded: 1998
- Genre: Contemporary worship music
- Country of origin: United Kingdom
- Location: Kingston upon Hull
- Official website: www.vineyardrecords.co.uk

Vineyard Records UK (VRUK) is the worship ministry of Vineyard Churches UK and Ireland (VCUKI). It is a not-for profit music label that exists to document and release worship songs that are being written in the Vineyard UK church movement.

== History ==
Originally established in 1998 as Vineyard Music (UK) a division of Vineyard Music worldwide the organisation rebranded in 2005 to become known as Vineyard Records UK. VRUK have released a number of worship albums since 1998, their most well known being the Come Now is the Time to Worship (1998) and Hungry (1999) albums.

Artists who have recorded for Vineyard Records UK include:

- Vicky Beeching
- Nigel Briggs
- Brenton Brown
- Brian Doerksen
- Great Big God (Kids Ministry)
- Samuel Lane
- Kathryn Scott
- Nigel Hemming
- Harmony Smith
- Trent Band
