= Vicky Beeching =

British Christian musician and commentator

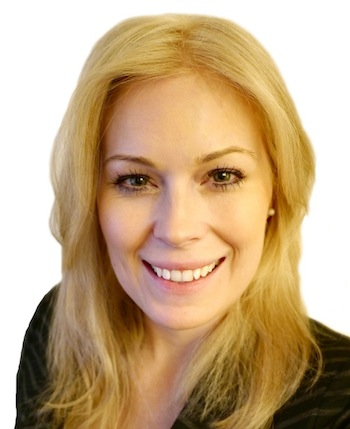
- Born: Victoria Louise Beeching; 17 July 1979 (age 47); Canterbury, Kent, England
- Education: University of Oxford; Durham University
- Occupations: Musician and religious commentator
- Website: vickybeeching.com

Victoria Louise Beeching (born 17 July 1979) is a British musician and religious commentator. She is best known for her work in the American contemporary worship music genre, and has been described by The Guardian as "arguably the most influential Christian of her generation" due to her Twitter following and appearances on BBC's Thought for the Day.

== Earlylife and education ==
Beeching grew up in Canterbury, where she attended the youth group at St. Mary Bredin Anglican church. She was enrolled in Simon Langton Girls' Grammar School from ages 11 to 18, and in her early teens she found it extremely difficult to reconcile her conservative Christian faith with her attraction to her female peers at school. She moved to Oxford in 1997 to attend the University of Oxford, where she obtained a bachelor's degree in 2000 and a master's degree in 2001, both in theology.

Beeching's mother, who leads musical worship at her church, taught Beeching to play the piano and guitar when she was young. Beeching began writing songs at the age of 10, and leading worship music in church youth services in her early teens.

From 1997 to 2001, she attended Oxford Vineyard Church, where she also led worship music during services. At Vineyard, she learned more about music writing from Brian Doerksen and Brenton Brown.

== Musical career ==
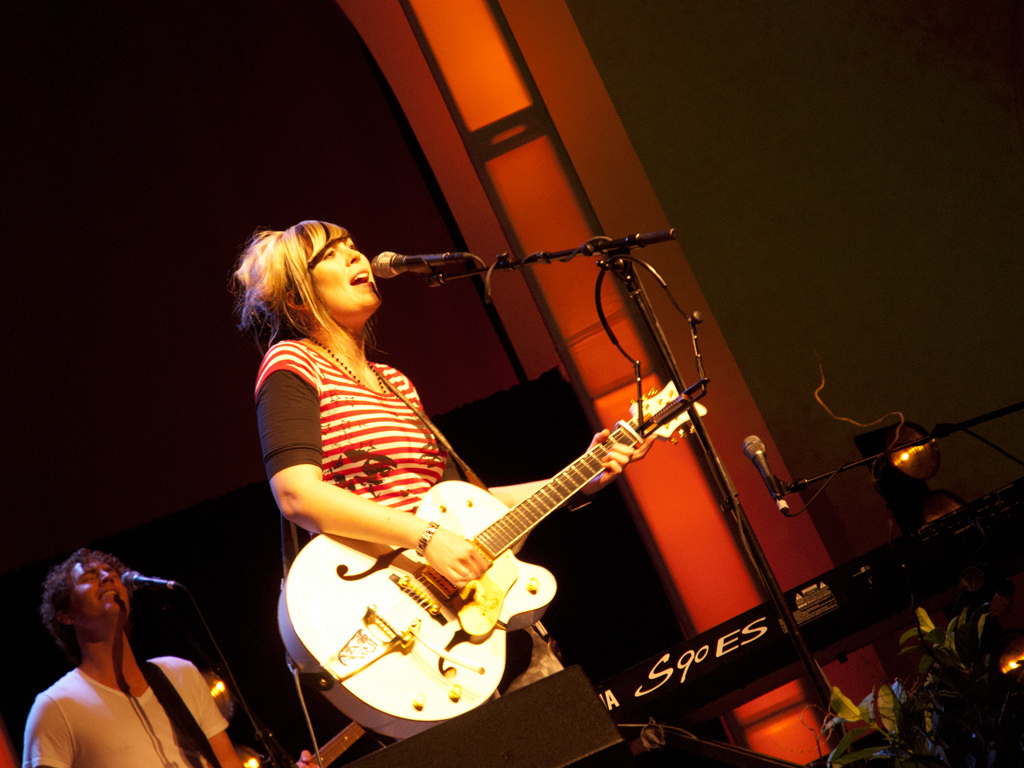
June 2010

Beeching moved to Nashville around 2002 for her music career. In December 2002, she released the Shelter EP through EMI UK and was featured on various compilation albums. She disclosed in a 2003 interview that she had recently quit her job as a Management Consultant so that she could focus on worship music full-time.

Beeching signed with Sparrow Records and released a 2005 EP, titled The Journey. Her first full-length Sparrow album, Yesterday, Today & Forever, was released on 27 December 2005. Her second full-length studio album, Painting the Invisible, was produced by Ed Cash and Nathan Nockels and released on 3 April 2007. Beeching wrote most of the album's material, although a few tracks include songwriting from Ed Cash, Matthew West and Joy Williams. Several of the songs for the album were written on Keith Green's old piano, at the invitation of her mentor and friend, Melody Green.

Hoping for a less conservative environment than Nashville, Beeching moved to San Diego in 2008 and began performing in churches there. Her third studio album "Eternity Invades" released in 2010, was recorded in San Diego. It features a song co-written with Steve Fee, "Glory To God Forever".

Beeching was a worship leader at the Spring Harvest Christian festival from 2010 to 2012, leading worship in the 'Big Top' at Minehead and participating in the Spring Harvest Theme Group.

== Media presence ==
Beeching's blog, which enjoyed some popularity, covered difficult Christian issues such as the role of women in the Church. Her blog was the Winner for Best Blog in the 2011 Christian New Media Awards.

Beeching began speaking out in favour of gay marriage beginning in December 2013. Her blog posts on support for same-sex marriage were widely read and received a mixed response – many LGBT Christians expressed their gratitude and shared their own stories of faith and sexuality, but some of her social media followers expressed disapproval, even "quite vitriolic and quite personal" criticism. However, in response to the discussions she'd started in the church about sexuality, she received a nomination for the 2014 National Diversity Awards in the category of "Positive Role Model Race, Faith & Religion". (She did not end up on the shortlist for that year.)

In August 2014, Beeching announced she is a lesbian. In November 2014, she was awarded third place in The Independent on Sunday's 2014 Rainbow List (a feature highlighting influential LGBT persons).

As of mid-2015, Beeching is a regular television and radio commentator on issues related to ethics, technology, women, Christianity, music and social media. In June 2018, she published Undivided, a memoir about her faith and sexuality, with HarperCollins.

Beeching also enjoys a large Twitter following (over 50,000 people in August 2014 and over 64,000 as of June 2017).

== Personal life ==
In 2009, Beeching was diagnosed with linear scleroderma morphea, for which she underwent 18 months of chemotherapy.

Beeching moved to central London in December 2012. As of February 2013, she was pursuing a PhD in the Department of Theology and Religion at Durham University, with religion, technology, "online connectivity," and ethics as her topics of focus. In June 2014, Beeching announced that she had changed her PhD focus topic to Christianity and sexuality. Shortly after she announced her sexual orientation, an interviewer wrote that her new PhD focus is specifically Christianity and same-sex marriage; she continues to identify as an Evangelical Christian who is a member of the Church of England.

Since the publication of her memoir, Beeching has received criticism. As a result, she has taken regular breaks from social media. In May 2019, Beeching tweeted that she had moved to the Kent coast due to expensive rent in London and because of her health conditions.

== Health issues ==
Beeching has written about her health issues including scleroderma, Ehlers–Danlos syndrome and ME/CFS. As of 2023, she is mostly housebound, significantly disabled and reliant on an electric wheelchair for mobility the majority of the time.

== Honours ==
In June 2017, Beeching was awarded the Cranmer Award for Worship by the Archbishop of Canterbury "for outstanding contributions to contemporary worship music".

== Works ==
=== Discography ===
- Shelter EP (2002)
- The Journey EP (2005)
- Yesterday, Today & Forever (2005)
- Painting the Invisible (2007)
- Eternity Invades (2010)

==== Compilation appearances ====
- The People's Album – (1997, Soul Survivor) – "Search Me O God" (lyrics by Beeching, sung by Beth Redman)
- Hungry – (1999, Vineyard UK) – "There's No One Like Our God" (later re-recorded for "Yesterday, Today & Forever")
- Surrender – (2000, Vineyard UK) – "At All Times" (later re-recorded for "Painting the Invisible") and "All That I Need"
- Holy – (2002, Vineyard UK) – "Awesome God" (later re-recorded as "Majesty and Mystery (Awesome God)" for "Yesterday, Today & Forever") and "Above All Else" (later re-recorded and featured in other albums)
- Anthem of the Free – (2003, Soul Survivor) – "Yesterday Today And Forever" (later featured in other albums)
- Festival Manchester (2003, Kingsway) – "Nothing is impossible" (later re-recorded for "Yesterday, Today & Forever")
- Here I Am To Worship – Vol. 1 (2004, EMICMG) – "Yesterday, Today, And Forever"
- Precious (2004) – "Extravagant Worship" (originally from "Shelter" EP but re-recorded for this album)
- Here I Am To Worship Vol 2 (2005, EMICMG) – "Stronger Than The Storm" (later featured in "Yesterday, Today, & Forever")
- Here I Am To Worship 3 (2005) – "Above All Else" (featured in "Yesterday, Today, & Forever")
- Help Me Hold On – UK worship (2005, Vital) – "Above All Else"
- Almighty Sound by Johnny Parks (2006, Survivor Records) – "Season of Singing"
- WOW Worship Aqua (2006, Provident) – "Yesterday, Today And Forever"
- The Ultimate Collection – Worship (2006) – Yesterday, Today And Forever
- Dancing Generation (2006, Soul Survivor) – Yesterday, Today And Forever (previously featured on Anthem of the Free)
- Survivor: 10 Years (2007, Soul Survivor) – Yesterday Today And Forever

=== Books ===
- Undivided: Coming Out, Becoming Whole and Living Free from Shame. HarperCollins 2018. ISBN 978-0008182144.
