= Christmas Worship, Vol. 2 =

Studio album by Paul Baloche
- Released: October 2, 2015
- Genre: Worship, CCM
- Length: 52:05
- Label: Integrity
- Producer: Michael Rossback

Paul Baloche chronology
Live (2014)	Christmas Worship, Vol. 2 (2015)	Your Mercy (2016)

Christmas Worship, Vol. 2 is the second Christmas album from Paul Baloche. Integrity Music released the album on October 2, 2015. The album is a follow-up to Christmas Worship (2013).

== Critical reception ==
Professional ratings
Review scores
Source	Rating
365 Days of Inspiring Media	4.5/5 stars
CCM Magazine	3/5 stars
Cross Rhythms	10/10 squares
Louder Than the Music	4.5/5 stars
New Release Today	4/5 stars

Tony Cummings, indicating in a ten out of ten review by Cross Rhythms, describes, "Baloche should be congratulated in creating, what is to my ears, the best Christmas song of the year." Awarding the album three stars for CCM Magazine, Matt Conner states, "Christmas Worship, Vol. 2 is an ideal package that puts a fresh spin on well known holiday tunes." Caitlin Lassiter, giving the album four stars from New Release Today, writes, "Paul created something truly refreshing and different with Christmas Worship II." Giving the album four and a half stars at 365 Days of Inspiring Media, Joshua Andre says, "Paul to show us both of these variants of Christmas music, is a treat!". Carolyn Aldis, allotting the album four and a half stars by Louder Than the Music, responds, "Paul has chosen some great artists to work on this album with him and the end product is a gift."

== Chart performance ==
The album placed at No. 6 on the Billboard magazine Holiday Albums chart.

== Track listing ==
No.	Title	Length
1.	"Joy to the World/Our God Saves" (featuring All Sons & Daughters)	4:35
2.	"For Unto Us a Child Is Born/Open the Eyes of My Heart"	3:27
3.	"Angels From the Realms of Glory/Emmanuel"	4:05
4.	"O Holy Night/Love Shines Bright" (featuring Kathryn Scott)	5:16
5.	"Gloria" (featuring Phil Wickham)	4:33
6.	"What Child Is This/Praise Emmanuel" (featuring Gina Milne)	4:35
7.	"It Came Upon a Midnight Clear/Glorious" (featuring Onajé Jefferson)	5:38
8.	"The Newborn King" (featuring Graham Kendrick)	4:22
9.	"The First Noel/Above All" (featuring Lenny LeBlanc)	5:06
10.	"Silent Night" (featuring Rita Baloche and David Baloche)	4:55
11.	"Silent Night (Guitar Reprise)"	1:42
12.	"When Love Crossed Over" (featuring Madison Cunningham)	3:51
Total length:		52:05

== Personnel ==
=== Musicians ===
- Paul Baloche – lead vocals, acoustic guitar, arrangements
- Michael Rossback – acoustic piano, guitars, bass, horns, arrangements
- Ari Heinikainen – Wurlitzer electric piano, organ
- Ben Gowell – guitars
- Scotty Murray – guitars
- Carl Albrecht – drums, percussion
- Jared Henderson – drums, percussion
- David Baloche – French horn, backing vocals, vocals (10)
- Rita Baloche – backing vocals, vocals (10), vocal arrangements
- Bri Giles – backing vocals
- Gina Milne – backing vocals, vocals (6)
- All Sons & Daughters – vocals (1)
- Kathryn Scott – vocals (4)
- Phil Wickham – vocals (5)
- Onajé Jefferson – vocals (7)
- Graham Kendrick – vocals (8)
- Lenny LeBlanc – vocals (9)
- Madison Cunningham – vocals (12)

=== Production ===
- C. Ryan Dunham – executive producer
- Michael Rossback – producer, engineer, mixing
- Paul Baloche – co-producer
- Rita Baloche – vocal producer
- Tom Brooks – engineer
- Jeoff Harris – engineer, editing, transcriptions
- Andrew Mendelson – mastering at Georgetown Masters (Nashville, Tennessee)
- Becca Nicolson – production coordinator
- Thom Hoyman – creative director, design
