= Nigel Hemming (songwriter) =

- Born: September 21, 1969 (age 56)
- Origin: Gravesend, UK
- Genres: Worship, pop, children's music
- Occupation(s): Senior Pastor, Songwriter, Musician, Producer
- Years active: 1990–present
- Labels: Vineyard Records UK

Nigel Hemming is a UK-based Christian songwriter and musician known for writing on and producing the Great Big God series and his involvement on the Vineyard Come Now Is the Time to Worship and Hungry albums.

== Background ==
After leaving university, Hemming worked as a primary school teacher and as a musician. In the early 1990s, he was the keyboardist for the band Fat and Frantic, performing at festivals such as Greenbelt and was part of the line-up when the band reformed in 2011.

Hemming became involved with recording for Vineyard Music UK when Brian Doerksen invited him to play keyboards on the Vineyard UK album Come Now Is the Time to Worship. Following the success of Come Now Is the Time to Worship Doerksen asked Hemming to co-produce Vineyard UK's second album Hungry. Hemming wrote the song "Beautiful God" from the album Come Now Is the Time to Worship and co-wrote the song "The Rhythm of Heaven" on the Hungry album.

The first Great Big God album was released in 2001. It was called Great Big God after the title song written by Nigel and Jo Hemming. Hemming co-produced the album with Brian Duane and wrote five of its songs.

Since the release of the first Great Big God album Hemming has produced and written for all six of the Vineyard Great Big God releases. He has now written over 30 children's worship songs and is widely regarded as having created "one of the most successful series of UK children's albums ever."

Hemming is a Vineyard Churches UK and Ireland pastor. He worked on staff at Birmingham Vineyard Church throughout the 2000s until moving in 2011 to become the senior pastor at the Winchester Vineyard Church with his wife Jo.

Hemming was a director of Vineyard Music UK from 2014 to 2017.

== Releases ==
Title	Artist	Role	Year of release
Come Now Is the Time to Worship	Vineyard UK	keyboards, songwriter	1998
Hungry	Vineyard UK	producer, songwriter, keyboards	1999
I Love Your Presence	Vineyard UK	producer, keyboards	2000
Surrender	Vineyard UK	keyboards	2000
Great Big God	Great Big God	producer, songwriter, vocals, keyboards	2001
Holy	Vineyard UK	producer, keyboards	2001
Great Big God 2: Tiny Little Me	Great Big God	producer, songwriter, vocals, keyboards, Wurlitzer, Synth	2002
Set Me Free	Vineyard UK	producer, vocals, keyboards	2003
Great Big God 3: God's Love Is Big	Great Big God	producer, songwriter, vocals, keyboards, acoustic guitar	2004
Great Big God Backing Tracks	Great Big God	producer, songwriter, keyboards	2005
Great Big God for PreSchoolers	Great Big God	producer, songwriter, vocals, keyboards, acoustic guitar	2005
Great Big God 4	Great Big God	producer, songwriter, vocals, keyboards	2009
Great Big God Live DVD'	Great Big God	producer, songwriter, vocals, keyboards	2009
The Lamb Has Conquered	Vineyard UK	piano, keyboards	2010
Carols in the City	Vineyard UK	producer, vocals, keyboards, acoustic guitar, percussion	2010
Great Big God 5: Ready to Go	Great Big God	producer, songwriter, vocals, keyboards	2014
Great Big God Great Big Box Set	Great Big God	producer, songwriter, vocals, keyboards	2016
