= The Same Love =

The Same Love may refer to:

- "The Same Love" (song), 1989 single by The Jets
- The Same Love (album), 2012 album by Paul Baloche, or its title song

== See also ==
- "Same Love", a 2012 single by Macklemore & Ryan Lewis.
- "Same Ol' Love", song by Ricky Skaggs
- Same Love, Same Rain (original title El mismo amor, la misma lluvia), 1999 Argentine/American romantic comedy film
