= Samuel Lane =

Samuel Lane may refer to:

- Samuel Lane (painter), English painter
- Samuel Armstrong Lane (1802–1892), English surgeon
- Samuel Johnathan Lane (1830–1891), English-born barrister and political figure in Ontario, Canada
- Samuel Lane (musician), British Christian musician and worship leader in the Vineyard Church
- Samuel M. Lane House, Marion, Iowa, listed on the NRHP in Linn County, Iowa

== See also ==
- Sam Lane (disambiguation)
