= God of Wonders (album) =

Live album by Paul Baloche
- Released: September 17, 2002
- Genres: Contemporary Christian music, Gospel music
- Length: 68:43
- Label: Integrity Media
- Producers: Paul Baloche, Marc Byrd, Steve Hindalong

Paul Baloche chronology
Open the Eyes of My Heart (2000)	God of Wonders (2002)	Offering of Worship (2003)

Professional ratings
Review scores
Source	Rating
Allmusic	4/5 stars

God of Wonders is a live album by Paul Baloche, released in 2002.

== Track listing ==
1. "Intro" – 1:02
2. "Face to Face" (P. Baloche, Marc Byrd, Steve Hindalong) – 4:37
3. "Stir Up a Hunger" (P. Baloche, Rita Baloche) – 4:52
4. "The Way" (P. Baloche) – 5:15
5. "Your Love Is Reaching Me" (Rita Baloche) – 4:50
6. "Jesus You Are" (Rita Baloche) – 5:10
7. "But for Your Grace/Amazing Grace" (Rita Baloche, John Newton) – 3:37
8. "Sacrifice" (P. Baloche) – 5:25
9. "Take My Life and Let It Be" (Frances Ridley Havergal) – 0:47
10. "God of Wonders" (Marc Byrd, Steve Hindalong) – 6:17
11. "Holy, Holy, Holy! Lord God Almighty" (John Bacchus Dykes, Reginald Heber) – 1:26
12. "Keep My Heart" (P. Baloche) – 6:06
13. "Monologue" – 1:44
14. "We Humble Ourselves" (P. Baloche, Rita Baloche, Malcolm du Plessis) – 5:38
15. "New Song" (Rita Baloche) – 4:32
16. "Monologue" – 0:38
17. "The Song of Jabez" (P. Baloche) – 6:47

== Personnel ==
- Paul Baloche – lead vocals, acoustic guitar
- Chris Springer – acoustic piano, keyboards
- Phil Madeira – accordion
- Rita Baloche – backing vocals, acoustic guitar (6)
- Marc Byrd – electric guitars, acoustic guitar (10), backing vocals (10)
- Milo Deering – acoustic guitar, mandolin, pedal steel guitar
- Chris Donahue – bass
- Dennis Holt – drums
- Steve Hindalong – percussion
- David Henry – cello
- Jacob Lawson – viola, violin
- Perry Coleman – backing vocals
- Christine Glass-Byrd – backing vocals

=== Production ===
- Don Moen – executive producer
- Chris Thomason – executive producer
- Chris Springer – A&R
- Paul Baloche – producer
- Marc Byrd – producer
- Steve Hindalong – producer
- Greg Hunt – recording
- Gary Leach – recording
- David Schober – mixing
- Hank Williams – mastering
- Right Hand Design – graphic design
- Thomas Petillo – photography

Studios

- Recorded and Mixed at Rosewood Studios (Tyler, Texas).
- Mastered at MasterMix (Nashville, Tennessee).
