= The Same Love (album) =

Studio album by Paul Baloche
- Released: March 13, 2012
- Genres: Contemporary Christian music, Worship
- Length: 1:00:26
- Label: Integrity
- Producers: Ben Gowell, Michael Rossback

Paul Baloche chronology
Glorious (2009)	The Same Love (2012)	Christmas Worship (2013)

The Same Love is the seventh studio album by the Christian Contemporary Christian music-worship musician Paul Baloche. The album, produced by Ben Gowell and Michael Rossback, was released on March 13, 2012, by Integrity Media. It reached No. 30 on the Billboard Top Christian Albums chart and gained critical acclaim.

== Music and lyrics ==
Barry Westman of All About Worship wrote that the album contains "a batch of fresh, powerful, creative new songs for the church". Allmusic's Robert Ham wrote that the "songs build and build until they overflow with choruses that sound amazing when sung by a huge group of people", and stated that "Loud or soft, Baloche knows how to pull at the spirit, calling for listeners to lift up their voices and join in". At CCM Magazine, Andrew Greer wrote that the music comes from "a modern worship waymaker, Baloche's twelfth recording offers his most distinctive songs and relevant production to date [...] a heady statement considering his two decade catalog of church staples like 'Your Name' and 'Hosana.'" He felt that with "modern electric and acoustic trends, his engaging vocal, plus co-writes and guest vocals by Kari Jobe and All Sons & Daughters add hip factor".

At Cross Rhythms, Doug Holland said that Baloche tends to get "into the song very quickly, with straightforward and grand lyrical ideas helping to build swiftly to a big guitar-driven chorus". Jonathan Andre of Indie Vision Music highlighted that "The Same Love shows a maturity in Paul's writing, as he combines simple melodies and honest lyrics with ingenious instrumental arrangements". At New Release Tuesday, Dawn Teresa wrote that Baloche is "the sensitive singer-songwriter with heartfelt songs ... and this CD is sure to capture listeners' hearts and radio programmers' ears". Jono Davies of Louder Than the Music wrote that "there is a great mix of styles and tempos here which is interesting to listen to musically and again Paul does what he does best, singing lyrics that tell the listener how great God is".

Christian Music Zine's Joshua Andre wrote that "this album can literally be sung in the church. With more collaborations, co-writes and guest vocals on this album than any other he has done, for me Paul has raised the bar higher than ever on 'The Same Love', which I am sure has the potential to be a classic worship album in 10 or so years". However, The Citizen's Bruce Dennill thought that "given the congregational context he's writing for, such a start all but guarantees a good reception, but it's not necessarily interesting from a listening point of view". With respect to vocals, Dave Urbanski of Christianity Today wrote, "Baloche's moody vocals are reminiscent of Switchfoot's Jon Foreman, which blends well with the album's modern-rock vibe." Davies of Louder Than the Music wrote that "there is a fresh hint of youthfulness in his voice, how he has done this I don't know, but all I can say is his voice sounds in top tune for this album" with his "vocals sounding as fresh and strong".

== Critical reception ==
Professional ratings
Review scores
Source	Rating
All About Worship	4.5/5 stars
Allmusic	3.5/5 stars
CCM	4/5 stars
Christian Music Zine	4.75/5
Christianity Today	4/5 stars
The Citizen	8/10 stars
Cross Rhythms	8/10 stars
Indie Vision Music	4/5 stars
Louder Than the Music	5/5 stars
New Release Tuesday	5/5 stars

The Same Love was acclaimed by music critics. All About Worship's Barry Westman called it an "amazing album". Robert Ham of Allmusic felt that Baloche "doesn't need to tweak the formula one iota". At CCM Magazine, Andrew Greer said that "the lyrical heart of Love is timeless, providing career trends are second to truth telling for Baloche, one of the industry's true worship pioneers". Joshua Andre of Christian Music Zine proclaimed the album to be a "truly [...] magnificent masterpiece". He felt that it is "a work of art, nothing short of amazing".

At Christianity Today, Dave Urbanski highlighted the "pitch-perfect production, a heavenward focus — The Same Love delivers the goods". The Citizen's Bruce Dennill wrote that "a firm musical foundation is essential when writing lyrics that overlap thematically, and The Same Love combines everything well". At Cross Rhythms, Doug Holland felt that "whether it will be embraced by the Church to quite the same extent remains to be seen". Jonathan Andre of Indie Vision Music wrote, "Well done Paul for this worship experience!"

Louder Than the Music's Jono Davies affirmed that he "would highly recommend this album to anybody", and that the release contains "many more gems as good as that title track". At New Release Tuesday, Dawn Teresa called it a "steadfast, earnest offering in which he, like his biblical namesake, points us again and again to the Gospel, the good news that is Jesus Christ", and noted that "from beginning to end, the album's gaze never shifts". She wrote that "for worship music that is genuine and leaves plenty of quiet for prayer and reflection, and for God to move, look no further than Paul Baloche" for "a top-notch worship album".

== Commercial performance ==
The album was at No. 30 in the Billboard Top Christian Albums chart in the United States for the week of March 31, 2012.

== Track listing ==
The Same Love
No.	Title	Writer(s)	Length
1.	"The Same Love"	Paul Baloche, Michael Rossback	4:31
2.	"We Are Saved"	Baloche, Ben Fielding, Jason Ingram	4:08
3.	"King of Heaven"	Baloche, Ingram	4:47
4.	"All Because of the Cross"	Baloche, Ben Gowell, Robert Lowery	4:54
5.	"Your Blood Ran Down"	Baloche	2:34
6.	"My Hope"	Baloche, Ed Kerr, Alyssa Mellinger, Sheila Rabe	5:13
7.	"Oh Our Lord"	Baloche, Leslie Jordan, David Leonard	5:15
8.	"Christ the Lord"	Baloche, Charles Wesley	4:38
9.	"Reign in Me"	Baloche, Ingram	5:13
10.	"Just Say"	Baloche, Anthony Hoisington, Chris Hoisington	4:08
11.	"Loved by You"	Baloche, Lincoln Brewster	4:24
12.	"Look Upon the Lord"	Baloche, Ingram, Kari Jobe	5:25
13.	"Shout for Joy"	Baloche, Brewster, Ingram	5:16
Total length:			1:00:26

== Personnel ==
- Paul Baloche – vocals, acoustic guitar, electric guitars
- John Arndt – keyboards, string arrangements
- Jason Ingram – keyboards, backing vocals
- Ben Gowell – keyboards, programming, acoustic guitar, electric guitars, mandolin, dobro, banjo, lap steel guitar, percussion
- Michael Rossback – keyboards, programming, electric guitars, pedal steel guitar, bass guitar, percussion, glockenspiel, trumpet, backing vocals
- Don Harris – acoustic piano, electric upright bass
- Jay Wadley – Hammond B3 organ
- Tyler Burkum – electric guitars, lap steel guitar
- Scotty Murray – electric guitars, pedal steel guitar
- Aaron Fabrinni – electric upright bass
- Carl Albrecht – drums, percussion
- Daniel Grothe – drums
- David Halvorson – cello
- Dan Lawonn – cello
- Catherine Hanson – viola
- Rebecca Harris-Lee – violin
- Rita Baloche – backing vocals, vocal arrangements
- Lyssa Berner – backing vocals
- Michael Bryce – backing vocals
- Brothers McClurg (Anthony Hoisington and Chris Hoisington) – backing vocals
- Kyle Bucklin – backing vocals
- Laurie Cooper – backing vocals
- Ben Fielding – backing vocals
- Dianne Frias – backing vocals
- Justin Gearing – backing vocals
- Laura Gearing – backing vocals
- Dave Hatley – backing vocals
- Kari Jobe – backing vocals
- Mary Jones – backing vocals
- Leslie Jordan – backing vocals
- Angela Krüsi – backing vocals
- David Leonard – backing vocals
- Dakota McGrath – backing vocals
- Andrea Romero – backing vocals
- Kathryn Scott – backing vocals

=== Production ===
- C. Ryan Dunham – executive producer
- Jay King – A&R
- Ben Gowell – producer, engineer, mixing
- Michael Rossback – producer, engineer
- Rita Baloche – vocal producer
- Gary Leach – additional engineer
- Roy Salmond – additional engineer
- Rusty Varenkamp – additional engineer
- Ainslie Grosser – mixing
- Sean Moffitt – mixing
- Shane D. Wilson – mixing
- Dan Shike – mastering at Tone and Volume Mastering in Nashville, Tennessee
- Dave Taylor – production coordinator
- Frank Dejong – production manager
- Thom Hoyman – creative director, design
- Jeremy Cowart – photography

== Charts ==
Chart (2012)	Peak position
US Top Christian Albums (Billboard)	30
