= Let the River Flow with Darrell Evans =

Live album by Darrell Evans
- Released: 1997
- Genre: Worship music
- Length: 67:39
- Label: Hosanna! Music
- Producer: Paul Mills; Chris Long and Don Moen (executive producers)

Darrell Evans chronology
Let the River Flow with Darrell Evans (1997)	You Are I AM (1998)

Let the River Flow with Darrell Evans is a live Christian worship music album by Darrell Evans released by Hosanna! Music in 1997. The album was nominated for the 1998 Dove Award category of Praise and Worship Album of the Year.

== Track listing ==
1. "New Song Arisin'" (Darrell Evans) - 4:01
2. "My God Reigns" (Evans) - 4:47
3. "We Will Embrace Your Move" (Evans) - 7:00
4. "Let the River Flow" (Evans) - 6:28
5. "You Are I Am" (Evans) - 4:54
6. "Refuge" (Evans) - 6:28
7. "The Kingdom Song" (Evans) - 5:24
8. "Favorite Friend" (Evans) - 5:10
9. "I Surrender" (Evans and Scott Griffith) - 6:46
10. "I Am Yours" (Evans) - 5:33
11. "How Deeply I Need You" (Evans) - 4:58
12. "The Spirit of Revival" (Evans) - 6:10

== Credits ==
Producers:

- Paul Mills
- Lisa Terrell

Executive Producers:

- Chris Long
- Don Moen

A&R Director

- Chris Springer A&R, A&R assistance

Worship Leader:

- Darrell Evans

Musicians:

- Scott Griffith – keyboards
- Paul Mills – keyboards
- Darrell Evans – acoustic guitar
- Todd Davidson – electric guitar
- David Massey – electric guitar
- Jerry McPherson – mandolin, additional guitars
- Matt Jones – bass
- Scott French – drums
- James Giancola – drums
- Gyle Smith – drums
- Matt Steele – percussion

Background Vocals:

- Preston Bostwick
- Gayla Evans
- Heidi French
- Denise Johnson
- Chris Rodriguez
- Nicol Smith
- Jennifer George – female solo on "Refuge"

Engineers:

- Paul Mills – engineer, mixing
- Matt Damico – assistant engineer
- Glenn "Zippy" Montjoy – assistant engineer, editing, mastering
- Jeff Pitzer – assistant engineer
- Recorded "Live" at Open Bible Fellowship, Tulsa, OK.
