= Consuming Fire =

Live album by Darrell Evans and Friends
- Released: 2004
- Genre: Worship music
- Label: Spirit-Led Records
- Producer: Darrell Evans; Darrell Evans and Rick Shadle (executive producers)

Darrell Evans and Friends chronology
Trading My Sorrows (2002)	Consuming Fire (2004)	Uncharted Waters (2006)

Consuming Fire is a live Christian worship music album by Darrell Evans and friends released in April 2004. It was recorded at World Revival Church in Kansas City, MO and Trinity Church in Amarillo, TX.

== Track listing ==
1. "Worship Intro" - 1:59
2. "Consuming Fire" (Darrell Evans) - 3:30
3. "Jesus I Come to Follow" (Evans) - 5:22
4. "Anywhere with You" (Evans) - 4:16
5. "Precious Jesus" (with Kate Miner) (Evans) - 5:31
6. "Exalted" (with Charlie Hall) (Evans) - 4:33
7. "Blessed Be the Lord" (Evans) - 3:54
8. "My Everything" (Evans and Andre Gonzalez) - 3:31
9. "Fields of Grace" (with Mike Weaver of Big Daddy Weave) (Evans) - 4:26
10. "My Reward" (with Paul Baloche) (Paul Baloche) - 4:20
11. "The One and Only" (Evans) - 4:36
12. "Just As I Am" (Evans) - 4:50
13. "Harp in My Heart" (with Kevin Prosch) (Kevin Prosch) - 8:33
14. "Dream Before You" (with Kate Miner) (Music: Kate Miner; Words: Judie Lawson) - 5:35
15. "Let the River Flow 2" (Evans) - 4:55

== Personnel ==
- Darrell Evans – lead vocals, acoustic guitars, arrangements
- Rob Gungor – keyboards, arrangements, backing vocals
- Chad Copelin – organ
- Jeff Coleman – electric guitars
- Brandon Culvey – electric guitars
- Brian Hendrix – bass
- Gary Lunn – bass
- Trent Austin – drums
- Rudy Royston – drums

== Production ==
- Darrell Evans – executive producer, producer
- Rick Shadle – executive producer
- Eric Conn – live sound recording, overdub recording, mastering
- Kevin Prosch – mixing
- Jon Schroeder – mix assistant
- Randall Landis – layout, photography
- Jim Kerkusz – photography
