= Dave Hensman =

Canadian Christian singer-songwriter and minister (1962–2026)

- Born: David John Hensman; August 19, 1962; Goose Bay, Newfoundland and Labrador, Canada
- Died: July 11, 2026 (aged 63)
- Genres: CCM, Worship
- Occupations: Singer, songwriter, minister, businessperson, politician
- Instruments: Vocals, Guitar, Bass, Keyboards
- Label: Big Sky Music
- Website: www.davidjohnhensman.com

David John Hensman (August 19, 1962 – July 11, 2026) was a Canadian Christian singer-songwriter, minister, businessperson and politician from Mission, British Columbia.

== Musical career ==
Hensman began writing and performing his own songs during the late 1970s and through the 1980s with three different bands: Fish Tank, Last Harvest Band and the Alpha Omega Band. The latter being a Christian rock ministry focused on evangelism.

His most notable musical contributions began in 2006 when he released the album These Are The Days. It received some critical acclaim and was nominated for the "Praise and Worship Album of the Year" by the Canadian Gospel Music Association and "Gospel Recording of the Year" by the East Coast Music Association.

Then in 2009 he released the album Find Me/Blessed Are The Lost Ones. The album cover design won the Covenant Award for "Album Design of the Year" and two other nominations: "Praise and Worship Song of the Year" (You Alone) and "Modern Worship Song of the Year" (Author of our Faith). The album was nominated "Gospel Recording of the Year" by the East Coast Music Association.

== Business career ==
Hensman purchased Teamwork Property Management in 2003, a company located in Abbotsford, British Columbia that provides management services to Strata Corporations in the Fraser Valley. He sold TPM in 2012.

== Political career ==
In 2001 Hensman ran for political office in the Maple Ridge-Pitt Meadows district during the British Columbia general election as a member of the Unity Party. He lost to Ken Stewart of the BC Liberals. In 2012 he became a councilor for the city of Mission.

== Ministry ==
In December 2017, Hensman became Pastor of River of Life Church, now known as Redemption Hill Church in Stanwood, Washington. Redemption Hill Church is located on its multi-acre campus where currently the church is constructing an amphitheater and where it has plans to build its new church sanctuary. The grand opening of the amphitheater is anticipated to be Summer 2022.

== Death ==
Hensman died on July 11, 2026, at the age of 63.

== Discography ==
=== Albums ===
- These Are The Days (2006)
- Find Me/Blessed Are The Lost Ones (2009)
- Black Sheep Sun (2019)

=== Songs in other projects ===
- "What A Love" and "Love Jesus", Worship in the Pacific NW (Calvary Chapel Northwest, 1998)
- "Father's House", Worship in the Pacific NW (Calvary Chapel Northwest, 1999)
- "Let It Be", Sea to Sea: For Endless Days (Lakeside Media Group, 2006)
- "Hear Us Call", Holy God (Brian Doerksen album) (Integrity, 2006)
