= Sam Lane =

Sam Lane may refer to:

- Sam Lane (character), character that has appeared in DC Comics publications
- Sam Lane (rugby union) (born 1991), Australian rugby union player
- Sam Lane (field hockey) (born 1997), New Zealand field hockey player

== See also ==
- Samantha Lane (born 1979), Australian journalist
- Samuel Lane (disambiguation)
