= Samuel Lane (musician) =

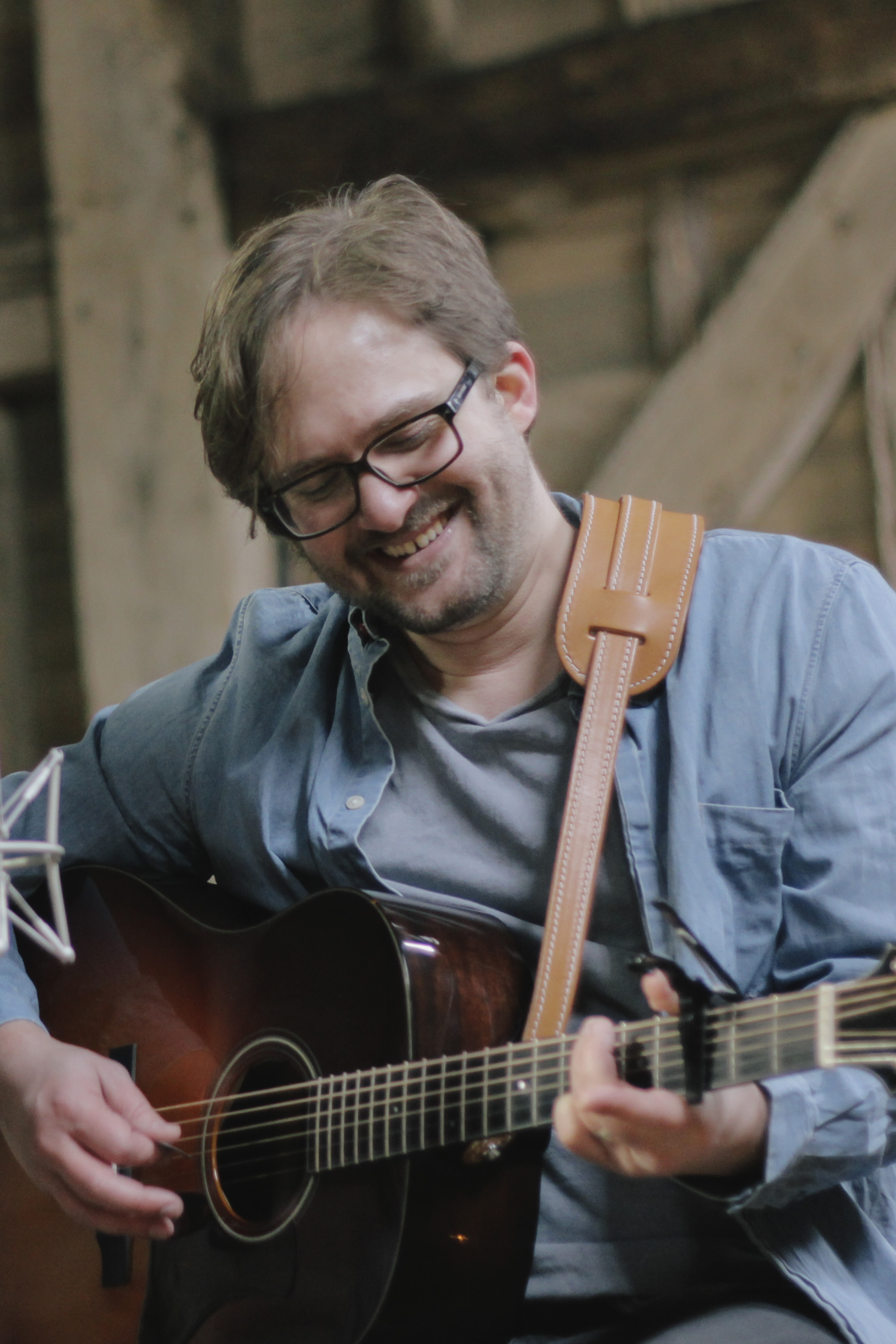

Background information
- Origin: England, UK
- Genres: Worship
- Occupation: Worship pastor
- Website: SamuelLane.com

Samuel Lane is a UK based Christian worship leader and musician.

== History ==
Samuel has been in the UK Vineyard Church movement from an early age and served as the Worship Pastor at The Vineyard Church St Albans. Samuel Lane was a co-founder of The Burn Church and the Burn Band. He started writing songs in his teenage years and had his first worship song released on the album Holy released by Vineyard Records UK in 2002. Samuel has been involved with a number of different album projects released by Vineyard Records UK including Beautiful, All from You and his debut solo album The Fire released in 2013. He has written a number of well-known Christian worship songs including "Beautiful", "Adore Him", "Lord You're Near" and "Fiery Love". His song "Beautiful" was covered by Jesus Culture and featured on their 2008 album Your Love Never Fails. Samuel has a distinctive vocal sound that has been described as "intense, yet subdued" and his tone being "Springsteen-esque".

== Discography ==
Album title	Year of release
Holy	2002
Beautiful	2002
All from You	2006
The Fire	2013
The Fire: Acoustic EP	2013
Samuel Lane: The 252 Sessions	2014
The Difference	2018
