= WOW Worship: Yellow =

Compilation album by Various artists
- Released: March 18, 2003
- Genre: CCM, CWM
- Length: 77:20 (Disc 1); 75:56 (Disc 2)
- Label: Provident Label Group

WOW Worship compilation albums chronology
WOW Worship: Green (2001)	WOW Worship: Yellow (2003)	WOW Worship: Red (2004)

Professional ratings
Review scores
Source	Rating
Allmusic	3/5 stars

WOW Worship: Yellow is the fourth installment in the WOW Worship series. Following the tradition of the WOW Worship series, it is a double-disc collection featuring 33 worship songs from today's artists. It also includes 7 new songs exclusive to this release. The album reached #44 on the Billboard 200 chart. The album was certified as platinum in 2003 by the Recording Industry Association of America (RIAA).

== Track listing ==
Disc 1

1. Michael W. Smith - Awesome God – 4:03
2. Rebecca St. James - Breathe – 3:57
3. Mac Powell (of Third Day) and Cliff & Danielle Young (of Caedmon's Call) - God of Wonders – 5:10
4. Amy Grant - Imagine – 3:47
5. Caedmon's Call - Majesty – 4:07 **
6. Nichole Nordeman - You Are My All in All – 4:12 **
7. Jeff Deyo (of SONICFLOOd) & Lisa Kimmey from Out of Eden - I Could Sing of Your Love Forever – 4:54
8. Joy Williams - Hungry (Falling on My Knees) – 4:31 **
9. Chris Tomlin - Forever – 5:14
10. NewSong - You Are My King – 4:44
11. Darlene Zschech - I Give You My Heart – 6:32
12. Out of Eden - Every Move I Make – 4:16
13. Matt Redman - Let Everything That Has Breath – 4:18
14. Nicole C. Mullen - Redeemer – 4:56
15. 4Him - Thy Word – 4:36 **
16. Rich Mullins - Step By Step – 2:27
17. Big Daddy Weave - Audience Of One – 5:24

Disc 2

1. Third Day - Your Love Oh Lord – 3:55
2. Mark Schultz - Shout To The Lord – 4:38 **
3. Jeff Deyo - More Love, More Power – 4:27
4. Tim Hughes - Here I Am To Worship – 5:15
5. Adrienne Liesching and Geoff Moore - In Christ Alone – 5:46
6. The Katinas - Draw Me Close – 5:17
7. Delirious? - The Happy Song – 4:31
8. FFH - Better Is One Day – 3:38 **
9. Phillips, Craig and Dean - Come, Now is the Time to Worship – 3:58
10. Passion - The Heart of Worship – 6:06
11. Chris Tomlin with Matt Redman - The Wonderful Cross – 7:07
12. Twila Paris - He Is Exalted – 3:45
13. Jars of Clay - Be Thou My Vision – 4:15 **
14. Keith Green - Oh Lord, You're Beautiful – 4:22
15. GlassByrd - I Stand Amazed – 3:59
16. David Crowder Band - Our Love Is Loud – 4:48

=== Notes ===
** These seven songs were newly recorded specifically for this release.

== Certifications ==
Region	Certification	Certified units/sales
United States (RIAA)	Platinum	1,000,000^{^}
^{^} Shipments figures based on certification alone.
