= Causeway Coast Vineyard Church =

Evangelical Church in Coleraine, Northern Ireland

- Causeway Coast Vineyard Church
- Location: Coleraine, Northern Ireland
- Denomination: Protestant - Evangelical
- Tradition: Vineyard Churches UK and Ireland
- Website: causewaycoastvineyard.com

History
- Founded: May 1999
- Founder: Alan Scott

Causeway Coast Vineyard is a Protestant evangelical congregation in Coleraine, Northern Ireland. It is part of Vineyard Churches UK & Ireland, and the Evangelical Alliance.

The church was founded by six people in 1999, including husband and wife, Alan Scott and Kathryn Scott.

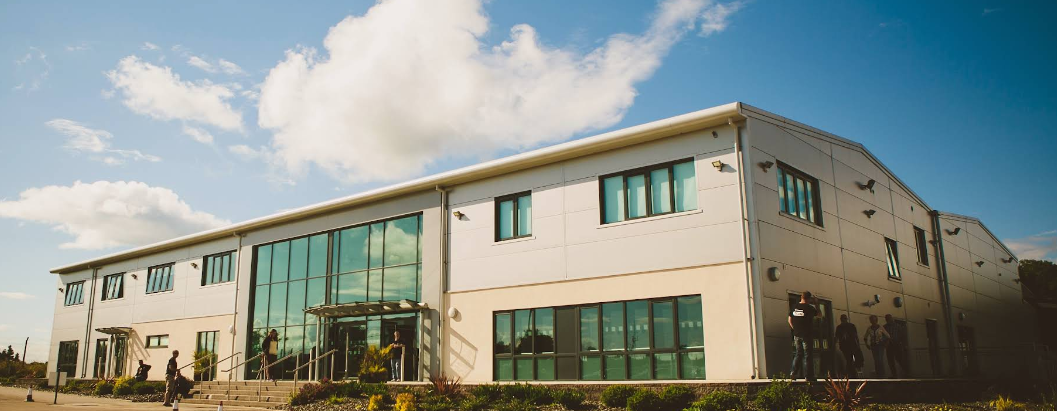
Causeway Coast Vineyard's church building on Hillman's Way, which opened in 2012.

== History ==
Causeway Coast Vineyard initially gathered in the Scott's home in 1999, before expanding to gather in a local pub in the Portstewart area. The congregation initially began with six people. The church met for a few years at the Coleraine campus of the University of Ulster, before moving to the former Dunnes shop site in central Coleraine.

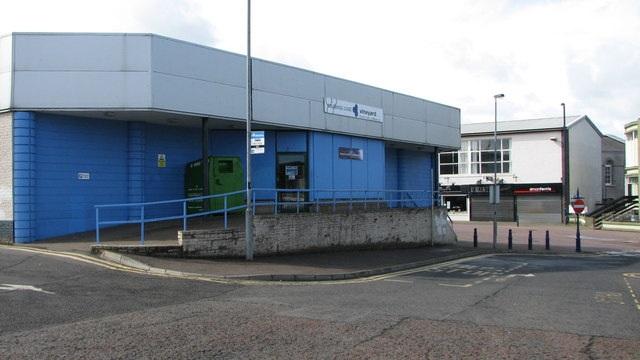
CCV's former site, in central Coleraine. The site has since been renovated into a store.

With growing membership, the church's Board of Trustees made the decision in 2010 to purchase a 7-acre site, and oversaw the building of a new £3 million, 33,000 square foot building for the church in 2012, in the former Aiken timberyard on Hillman's Way, off the Ballycastle Road.

The church currently hosts a Sunday service at 10:30am, with a monthly attendance of about 700 people. Laura Bell, formerly of Christian Fellowship Church in Belfast, was appointed the Church's senior pastor in October 2024.

=== Leadership ===
Leadership at Causeway Coast Vineyard
Senior Pastor(s)	Tenure
Alan and Kathryn Scott	1999-2018
Neil and Janet Young	2018-2023
Laura Bell	October 2024-

=== Healing on the Streets ===
A member of the church, Mark Marx, started a ministry of the church called 'Healing on the Streets'. HOTS' ministry involved offering to pray for passers-by faith healing, first on the streets of Coleraine and then training other churches to continue this ministry.

Mark Marx has since died, but the HOTS ministry has continued to grow in Northern Ireland.

The ministry is controversial, and advertising faith healing risks giving false hope to vulnerable people and breaching UK false advertising legislation.

=== Vineyard Compassion ===
Vineyard Compassion is the charity wing of the church, set up to care for the community and further afield. The church, which has provided Compassion Christmas Dinners since 2001, formally established the charity in May 2012. Within a twenty-minute walk of the church are areas with some of the highest levels of economic depravation in the country, with 27.5% of the local adult population considered in relative poverty. The charity has 21 staff and 210 volunteers as of 2025.

Vineyard Compassion's current ministries are centred around the Hope Centre, an extension on the main church building completed in April 2018. The charity's ministries include the Causeway Foodbank, a foodbank providing emergency food and toiletry essentials, the Wear House, which provides clothing for those in need, and the Reset Social Supermarket, a scheme which retails heavily subsidised food and toiletries as a means of helping people get out of poverty. Vineyard Compassion also offers the Christians Against Poverty (CAP) schemes, which help people navigate debt.

Vineyard Compassion hosts a car-boot sale and indoor farmer's market across the 10-acre site, which makes it the largest of its kind in Ireland.

Vineyard Compassion won the prestigious Queen's Award for Voluntary Service in 2018, the highest award for a charitable organisation in the United Kingdom.

=== Controversy ===
The church's founders, Alan Scott and his wife, the Christian songwriter and worship leader, Kathryn Scott, have since left the church and moved to Anaheim Vineyard, California, in 2018. After Alan and Kathryn announced their decision to move to California, Neil and Janet Young were made joint senior pastors.

A local theologian, Dr. Luke Martin, had attended the church as a teenager before achieving a Ph.D. at Oxford University and teaching at Eton College. Dr Martin has criticised Alan publicly and alleges nepotism in the appointment of the Scotts' family members Neil and Janet Young as Senior Pastors. Dr. Martin also noted that neither Neil and Janet had any theological qualifications, although this is not essential in VUKI recruitment.

After Alan and Kathryn's move, allegations emerged criticising Scott's leadership style at the church in Northern Ireland. The Board of Trustees, with responsibility of oversight over the leadership team, commissioned an independent report. In this, various respondents alleged that Alan Scott had appeared 'all knowing' and that he had told them God would tell him if anybody spoke about him, even in their own homes, and that he knew people's sin by looking at them.

Following the publishing of the independent report by the Board of Trustees, Senior Pastors Neil and Janet Young made the decision to resign in 2023. They did not believe their continuation as Senior Pastors could continue after the allegations in the report. Due to the nature of Vineyard Church governance, the Senior Pastors are under the oversight of the Board of Trustees and the Vineyard movement, with which the Senior Pastors disagreed with over the report.

At the same time, in California, Alan Scott was sued in the state of California for alleged fraud, due to his decision to take the Anaheim church and its $62 million worth of assets out of the Vineyard movement, forming a new independent church, 'Dwelling Place Anaheim'. Representatives of the church community alleged that Alan had promised not to do this during the recruitment process, and they alleged he had been fraudulent in this promise.

As a result of this crisis, Causeway Coast Vineyard report an attendance fall of 26% between January and December 2024. However, the church's attendance after the resolution of the difficulties has been seen to be growing.

== See also ==
Onehundredhours
