= Find Me/Blessed Are the Lost Ones =

Studio album by Dave Hensman
- Released: January 10, 2009
- Genre: CCM, worship
- Length: 62:13
- Label: Big Sky Music
- Producer: Philip Janz

Dave Hensman chronology
These Are the Days (2006)	Find Me/Blessed Are the Lost Ones (2009)

Find Me/Blessed Are the Lost Ones is the second album by Dave Hensman released on the Big Sky Music label. It was released on January 10, 2009. It features a song co-written with Brian Doerksen and a cover of the Neil Diamond song, "Hello Again". The album also features the guest vocal work of Tim Neufeld and Brian Doerksen amongst others.

The album cover was designed to have two different titles depending on which side it was viewed from: "Find Me" on one side and "Blessed Are The Lost Ones" on the other. In 2009 the album won the CD/DVD design artwork of the year at the Covenant Awards.

== Track listing ==
1. "Bridge Divine" - 5:10
2. "Take Me Down" - 4:26
3. "King of Love" - 5:32
4. "Look Around (Artist of the Ages)" - 5:01
5. "Play This Thing" - 4:10
6. "Find Me (Blessed Are the Lost Ones)" - 4:52
7. "I Will Still Follow" - 4:38
8. "Rain Down" - 4:45
9. "Hello Again" - 3:42
10. "Gloria" - 4:37
11. "All We Really Need" - 5:24
12. "Author of Our faith" - 4:28
13. "You Alone" - 5:28
