= Carl Tuttle =

American singer-songwriter

Carl Tuttle (December 26, 1953 - May 22, 2025) born in Natick, Massachusetts, was an American Christian singer-songwriter and hymnist.

His compositions include Hosanna, Hosanna, Hosannna to The King of Kings and Open Your Eyes, See The Glory of The King, both of which are included in many modern hymnaries. Hosanna, for example, appears in the Australian Hymn Book second edition Together in Song, in the Baptist Hymnal 2008 and was chosen as one of the top 100 worship songs by Lindsay Terry.

Tuttle learned to play the guitar and became an accomplished singer while at high school. In 1965 he became involved in a Christian group that included John Wimber. Influenced by Ralph Carmichael, he began writing songs. In 1976 he became worship leader at the church that met in his sister's home in Yorba Linda, California. He subsequently joined the worship team at Vineyard Christian Fellowship, Anaheim, then led by Wimber; they often collaborated in songwriting. From 1983 to 1990, his role expanded to planting churches and serving as a "Pastor to Pastors," while serving as the local Pastor of Vineyard in Santa Maria, CA., a time he considered as the most wonderful time of his life. In 1990, he returned to assist John Wimber at Anaheim and was eventually appointed to succeed him as Senior Pastor at the Anaheim Vineyard in late 1994, stepping down in 1997. His autobiography is "Reckless Mercy: A Trophy of God's Grace" (2017).
