= You Are I AM =

Studio album by Darrell Evans
- Released: 1998
- Genre: Worship music
- Length: 51:50
- Label: Vertical Music
- Producer: Paul Mills; Don Harris ("Whom Shall I Fear," "I Want to Know You")

Darrell Evans chronology
| Let the River Flow with Darrell Evans (1997) | You Are I AM (1998) | Freedom (1998) |

You Are I AM is a Christian worship music album by Darrell Evans released by Vertical Music in 1997.

== Track listing ==
1. "Whom Shall I Fear" [Psalm 27] - (Darrell Evans) - 5:23
2. "I Want to Know You" (Evans) - 5:23
3. "My God Reigns" (Evans) - 4:48
4. "We Will Embrace Your Move" [Isaiah 43:19; Psalm 100:5] - (Evans) - 5:53
5. "You Are I Am" (Evans) - 4:13
6. "New Song Arisin'" (Evans) - 3:43
7. "Let the River Flow" [Ezekiel 47] - (Evans) - 5:32
8. "I Surrender" (Evans and Scott Griffith) - 4:59
9. "I Am Yours" (Evans) - 6:00
10. "Take Me Away with You" (Evans) - 5:56

== Personnel ==
- Darrell Evans – lead vocals, acoustic guitar
- Chris Springer – keyboards (1, 2)
- Scott Griffith – keyboards (3–10)
- Glenn Pearce – electric guitars (1, 2)
- Todd Davidson – electric guitars (3–10)
- David Massey – electric guitars (3–10)
- Gary Lunn – bass (1, 2)
- Matt Jones – bass (3–10)
- Carl Albrecht – drums (1, 2)
- Scott French – drums (3–10)
- Gyle Smith – drums (3–10)
- Alex Acuña – percussion (1, 2)
- Matt Steele – percussion (3–10)
- Leann Albrecht – backing vocals (1, 2)
- Tom Lane – backing vocals (1, 2)
- Paul Smith – backing vocals (1, 2)
- Kelly Willard – backing vocals (1, 2)
- Preston Bostwick – backing vocals (3–10)
- Gayla Evans – backing vocals (3–10)
- Heidi French – backing vocals (3–10)
- Denise Johnson – backing vocals (3–10)
- Chris Rodriguez – backing vocals (3–10)
- Nicol Smith – backing vocals (3–10)

== Production ==
- Don Moen – executive producer
- Chris Thomason – executive producer
- Chris Springer – A&R
- Don Harris – producer (1, 2), arrangements (1, 2)
- Paul Mills – producer (3–10), arrangements (3–10), recording (3–10), mixing (3–10)
- Eric Elwell – recording (1, 2)
- Matt Damico – assistant engineer (1, 2)
- Jeff Pitzer – assistant engineer (3–10)
