= Open the Eyes of My Heart =

Contemporary Christian song

"Open the Eyes of My Heart" is a contemporary Christian song by Paul Baloche. The lyrics are based on Ephesians 1:18, a verse from the Apostle Paul's letter to the Ephesians. The song was originally recorded by Sonicflood for their debut album Sonicflood in 1999. The following year Paul Baloche released his own recording on his album Open the Eyes of My Heart. The song has also been recorded by Michael W. Smith for his album Worship, by Phillips, Craig, and Dean for their album Let My Words Be Few, and by Randy Travis on his album Worship & Faith.

== Lyrics ==
The song is written in verse–chorus form and features very simple lyrics. The first verse consists of the lyrics "Open the eyes of my heart, Lord" (sung twice, the second time without "Lord") and "I want to see You" (sung twice verbatim). The chorus is the most lyrically rich part of the song. "To see you high and lifted up, shining in the light of your glory. Pour out your power and love as we sing holy holy holy"

The second verse serves as a conclusion. It consists of "Holy, holy, holy" repeated three times and "I want to see You" as the final line, with minor variants at times.

The lyrical structure varies among different covers of this song. For example, the song as made popular by Michael W. Smith features "11C11CCC22222222" as its structure, while the Randy Travis cover features "111C11C2211" as its structure.
