= Hungry (Christian music album) =

Live album by Vineyard UK
- Released: March 1, 1999
- Genre: Christian music
- Length: 61:15
- Label: Vineyard Records UK
- Producers: Brian Doerksen, Nigel Hemming; Associate producers: Kathryn Scott, Michael Frye and Brenton Brown

Vineyard UK chronology
Come Now Is the Time (1998)	Hungry (1999)	Doing the Stuff (2000)

Hungry is an album of worship songs from Vineyard UK. It was recorded live in London, England and produced by Brian Doerksen and Nigel Hemming. This particular album is copyrighted by Vineyard Records UK.

This album was originally released as Hungry in 1999 by Vineyard Music UK Ltd. The album achieved platinum status in this incarnation. In 2005 this album was re-released as Vineyard Music UK; re-branded to Vineyard Records UK (VRUK).

== Track listing ==
1. "Hungry (Falling on My Knees)" - 5:41
2. "Your Name Is Holy" - 5:22
3. "Humble King" - 4:44
4. "There's No One Like Our God" - 3:27
5. "Make Your Home in Me" - 4:56
6. "Child Of God" - 4:49
7. "Be the Centre" - 6:56
8. "All Creation" - 4:15
9. "The Rhythm Of Heaven" - 5:17
10. "I Surrender" - 5:00
11. "Only You" - 4:59
12. "Refuge in You" - 3:47
13. "You Are a Holy God" - 5:32
14. "Breathe" - 6:30

== Track performers and writers ==
Hungry lists the following song writing credits:

Song	Songwriter	Performer
Hungry (Falling on My Knees)	Kathryn Scott	Kathryn Scott
Your Name Is Holy	Brian Doerksen	Brian Doerksen and Wendy O'Connell
Humble King	Brenton Brown	Brenton Brown
There's No One Like Our God	Vicky Beeching and Steve Mitchinson	Wendy O'Connell
Make Your Home in Me	Michael and Helen Frye	Michael Frye
Child of God	Kathryn Scott	Kathryn Scott
Be the Centre	Michael Frye	Michael Frye and Kathryn Scott
All Creation	Brian Doerksen and Steve Mitchinson	Brian Doerksen
The Rhythm of Heaven	Peter Eckley and Nigel Hemming	Kathryn Scott
I Surrender	Wendy O'Connell	Wendy O'Connell
Only You	Matt Hyam	Brenton Brown
Refuge in You	Bob Stratton, Brenton Brown and Pete Jones	Brenton Brown
You Are a Holy God	Brian Duane and Kathryn Scott	Michael Frye and Kathryn Scott
Breathe	Marie Barnett	Kathryn Scott
