= Freedom (Darrell Evans album) =

Studio album by Darrell Evans
- Released: 1998
- Genre: Worship music
- Length: 61:12
- Label: Vertical Music
- Producer: Paul Mills

Darrell Evans chronology
You Are I AM (1997)	Freedom (1998)	All I Want Is You (2001)

Freedom is the third Christian worship music album by Darrell Evans, released by Vertical Music in 1998. This album also features Lincoln Brewster who played lead guitar and aided in songwriting. "So Good to Me" is on the Digital Praise PC game Guitar Praise. The album was nominated for the 30th annual GMA Dove Award in the Praise and Worship Album of the Year category.

== Track listing ==
1. "Trading My Sorrows (Yes Lord)" (Darrell Evans) - 6:00
2. "So Good to Me" (Evans and Matt Jones) - 3:38
3. "Freedom" (Evans) - 5:44
4. "I Am in Love with You" (Evans) - 9:33
5. "I Know" (Lincoln Brewster and Evans) - 4:37
6. "You Bless Me" (Evans and Ben Ferrell) - 5:29
7. "When I Pray" (Evans) - 4:46
8. "You Are My Portion" (Evans) - 6:19
9. "Your Love is Extravagant" (Evans) - 8:06
10. "I Lay Me Down" (Evans) - 7:00

== Personnel ==
Musicians

- Darrell Evans – lead vocals, acoustic guitars
- Blair Masters – keyboards (1–4, 6–10)
- Paul Mills – keyboards (5)
- Lincoln Brewster – electric guitars, mandolin, acoustic guitar (5), lead vocals (5)
- Matt Jones – bass
- Trent Austin – drums
- Lisa Bevill – backing vocals
- Rikk Kittleman – backing vocals
- Gene Miller – backing vocals
- Integrity Staff – group shout (3)

Production

- Don Moen – executive producer
- Chris Thomason – executive producer
- Chris Springer – A&R
- Paul Mills – producer, arrangements, engineer, mixing
- Jeff Pitzer – assistant engineer
- Adrienne Sallee – assistant engineer
- Brad Talbot – art direction, design
- Rusty Rust – photography
