= Brian Doerksen =

Canadian Christian singer-songwriter (1965–2026)

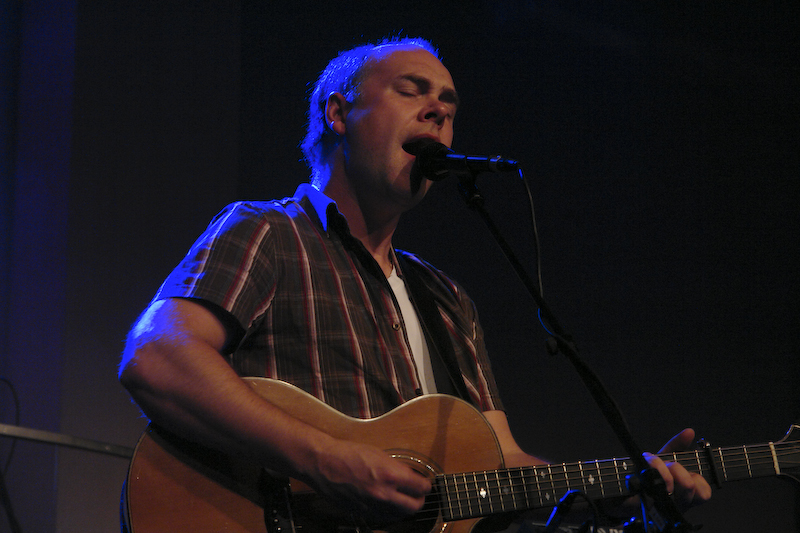
- Doerksen performing in 2008

Background information
- Born: November 17, 1965; Abbotsford, British Columbia, Canada
- Died: July 21, 2026 (aged 60) Abbotsford, British Columbia, Canada
- Genres: Christian, contemporary worship music
- Occupations: Songwriter, singer
- Instruments: Vocals, guitar
- Years active: 1989–2026
- Label: Integrity Music
- Website: briandoerksen.com

Brian Robert Doerksen (November 17, 1965 – July 21, 2026) was a Canadian Christian singer-songwriter and worship leader from Abbotsford, British Columbia.

== Early life ==
Doerksen was a member at a local Mennonite Brethren church in British Columbia and graduated from the Mennonite Educational Institute in 1983. In his early twenties, he joined the staff of the Langley Vineyard Christian Fellowship and spent several years there as the worship pastor in the late 1980s and early 1990s.

== Musical career ==
For many years Doerksen was part of the Vineyard Churches as well as Vineyard Music Group. In that context he was extremely influential in the area of contemporary Christian worship music. He was a featured worship leader on many Vineyard worship CDs and also taught extensively on worship leading and songwriting. Doerksen's worship recordings are known for their high production values and quality songwriting.

Notable songs written by Doerksen include: "Faithful One" (1989), "Refiner's Fire" (1990), "Light the Fire Again" (1994), "Come Now is the Time to Worship" (1998), "Hope of the Nations" (2003) and "Today (As for Me and My House)" (2008). Some of these songs have been covered by a number of artists including the Oslo Gospel Choir and Phillips, Craig & Dean.

Doerksen later produced worship music through Integrity's Hosanna Music, including his albums You Shine (2002), Today (2004), Live in Europe (2005), Holy God (2006) and It's Time (2008).

He received a Gospel Music Association Dove Award in 2003, only the second Canadian to be so honoured. He also won a string of Covenant Awards during his career including four in 2005, among them: Artist of the Year, Praise And Worship Album of the Year and Praise And Worship Song of the Year. Three more Covenant Awards followed in 2006, and a further six in 2007. In 2008 he won a Juno Award for the album Holy God.

Doerksen collaborated on a musical titled Prodigal God with playwright and worship pastor Christopher Greco. The production had its debut performance in February 2010 in Vancouver, before going on tour.

== Ministry ==
Doerksen served as one of two co-pastors along with Dean Richmond, Janine Richmond, Irv Esau, and Karin Esau at an interdenominational church they started on Mother's Day 2006, called The Bridge in Abbotsford. This church met in Matsqui Village. Doerksen was a teaching and worship arts pastor and oversaw the church's growing team of worship leaders.

He led Prairie Bible Institute's School of Worship Arts starting in September 2014.

== Personal life and death ==
Doerksen married his high school sweetheart in 1984. The couple had six children: four daughters and two sons. His sons both have fragile X syndrome. He resided with his family in Abbotsford, British Columbia, Canada.

Doerksen died from Stage 4 cancer on July 21, 2026, at the age of 60.

== Discography ==
Vineyard Music albums

- Changed by Your Glory (1989)
- Hear Our Cry (1990)
- We Behold You (1990)
- Your Kingdom Come (1990)
- Jesus Alone (1991)
- Save Us Oh God (1991)
- Worship Festival Live (1992)
- In Deiner Gegenwart Vol 1 & 2 (1993)
- Winds of Worship 1 (1994)
- Winds of Worship 2 (1994)
- Light the Fire Again (1994)
- Father's House (1995, review)
- Winds of Worship 4 (1995)
- Isn't He (1995, review)
- Winds of Worship 5 (1996)
- Winds of Worship 6 (1996)
- Faithful Father (1996)
- Winds of Worship 8 (1997)
- Come Now is the Time/Winds Of Worship 12 (1998)
- Father (1998)
- Intimacy (1998)
- Hungry (1999)
- God is Love (2000)
- Rise Up Europe (2000)
- Believe (2000)
- Change Me on the Inside (2001)
- Love Abbotsford Live (2001)
- All I Need (2002)

Kingsway Music albums

- Come and Follow (with Andy Park) (2001, review)

Love Abbotsford Association albums

- Love Abbotsford [Live] (2001)

Integrity Music albums

- You Shine (2002, reviews)
- Today (2004, review)
- Live in Europe (2005, review)
- Holy God (2006, review)
- It's Time (2008, review)
- Level Ground (2010)

Shining Rose/Indie solo albums

- Grateful (2017) – nominated for a 2019 Juno Award
- The Heart of Christmas (2019)
- Hymns For Life (2021)

EPs

- Everlasting Arms (2020)

Books

- The Brian Doerksen Guitar Songbook (2004, includes a DVD)
- Make Love, Make War: NOW is the Time to Worship (David C. Cook, 2009)

Songs in other projects

- WoW Worship (Blue), "Refiner's Fire" and "Come, Now Is The Time To Worship" (1999)
- WoW Worship (Orange), "Light the Fire Again" (2000)
- WoW Worship (Green), "Hallelujah (Your Love Is Amazing)" Brenton Brown & Brian Doerksen (2001)
- iWorship, Double CD, "Come, Now Is The Time To Worship", "You Shine", "Hallelujah (Your Love Is Amazing)" (Integrity, 2002)
- Real Men Worship, "Come Now Is The Time To Worship" (Integrity, 2003)
- iWorship: Next, "Refiner's Fire" (Integrity, 2004)
- Sea to Sea: Filled With Your Glory, "Today" (CMC, 2004)
- WoW Worship (Red), "Hallelujah (Your Love Is Amazing)" (2004)
- Sea to Sea: I See The Cross, "I See the Cross" (CMC, 2005)
- 27th Annual Covenant Hits, "Today" (CMC, 2006)
- Canadian Bible Society centennial CD: Good News Celebration, "Fortress 144" (CMC, 2006)
- Maximum Worship – Canada's Top 25 Worship Songs, "Come, Now Is The Time To Worship" (Hosanna, 2006)
- Sea to Sea: For Endless Days, "When You Shepherd Me" (CMC, 2006)
- YourMusicZone.com #1s, "Holy God" (CMC, 2007)
- 28th Annual Covenant Hits, "When You Shepherd Me" (CMC, 2007)
- iWorship: 24:7, "Holy God" (2007)
- Maximum Worship Blue – Canada's Top 25 Worship Songs, "Holy God", "Faithful One" and "Refiner's Fire" (Hosanna, 2007)
- Sea to Sea: The Voice of Creation, "Holy God" (CMC, 2007)
- Celtic Worship Live From Ireland: Hope of the Nations, "Hallelujah (Your Love Is Amazing)", "You Surround Me", "You Shine", "Faithful One" with Kathryn Scott, "It Is Well" (Integrity, 2007)
- Worship '09, "Holy God" (Promise Keepers Canada / Integrity, 2008)
- GMA Canada presents 30th Anniversary Collection, "Today (As For Me and My House)" (CMC, 2008)
- Maximum Worship Christmas, "You Shine" (Hosanna, 2008)
- Find Me/Blessed Are the Lost Ones, "You Alone" (2009)

Video

- Today (2004, review)
- Level Ground (2010)

== Awards and recognition ==
Gospel Music Association Dove Award

- 2003 International Award

GMA Canada Covenant Awards

- 2005 Male Vocalist of the Year
- 2005 Praise And Worship Album of the Year: Today
- 2005 Special Events/Compilation of the Year: Sea to Sea: Filled With Your Glory
- 2005 Praise And Worship Song of the Year: "Today" (written with Sandra Gage)
- 2006 Male Vocalist of the Year
- 2006 Artist of the Year
- 2006 Inspirational Song of the Year: "When You Shepherd Me"
- 2007 Artist of the Year
- 2007 Male Vocalist of the Year
- 2007 Album of the Year: Holy God
- 2007 Praise and Worship Album of the Year: Holy God
- 2007 Song of the Year: "Holy God"
- 2007 Praise And Worship Song of the Year: "Holy God"
- 2009 Praise And Worship Song of the Year: "It's Time For The Reign Of God" (written with Steve Mitchinson)
- 2011 Four awards, including: Special Events/Compilation of the Year: Prodigal God, Praise And Worship Album of the Year: Level Ground, Music DVD of the Year: Level Ground: The Live Experience, and Praise And Worship Song of the Year: "Welcome To The Level Ground" (written with Paul Baloche)
- 2014 Lifetime Achievement Award
- 2019 Inspirational Album of the Year: "Grateful"

Juno Awards

- 2008 Contemporary Christian/Gospel Album of the Year: "Holy God"

Praise Awards

- 2001 Best Worship Project: Hungry

Shai Awards (formerly The Vibe Awards)

- 2004 nominee, Artist of the Year
- 2004 nominee, Male Soloist of the Year
- 2005 Male Soloist of the Year
- 2005 Worship Album of the Year: Today
