= Glenn Packiam =

American singer (born 1978)

- Born: Glenn Previn Packiam; February 27, 1978 (age 48); Petaling Jaya, Selangor, Malaysia
- Origin: Colorado Springs, Colorado, U.S.
- Genres: CWM; Christian pop; Christian rock
- Occupations: Singer; songwriter; musician; worship leader; pastor
- Instruments: Vocals; guitar; piano; trumpet
- Years active: 2009–present
- Label: Integrity
- Website: glennpackiam.com

Glenn Previn Packiam (born February 27, 1978), is the Lead Pastor of Rockharbor Church in Costa Mesa, California, and a Senior Fellow at Barna Group. He is the author of eight books, the bestseller The Intentional Year: Simple Rhythms for Finding Freedom, Peace, and Purpose (NavPress, 2022), which he co-authored with his wife, Holly; the bestseller The Resilient Pastor (Baker, 2022); Worship and the World to Come (IVP Academic, 2020); Blessed Broken Given: How Your Story Becomes Sacred in the Hands of Jesus (Multnomah, 2019); Discover the Mystery of Faith (David C. Cook, 2013), LUCKY: How the Kingdom Comes to Unlikely People (Cook, 2011), Secondhand Jesus: Trading Rumors of God for a Firsthand Faith (Cook, 2009), and Butterfly in Brazil: How Your Life Can Make a World of Difference (Tyndale, 2007).

Glenn earned a Doctorate in Theology and Ministry from Durham University in the UK. He also holds BA in Theological/Historical Studies and Masters in Management from Oral Roberts University, and a Graduate Certificate in Theology from Fuller Theological Seminary. He is a Senior Fellow at Barna Group and a Visiting Fellow at St. John's College at Durham University. He is also an ordained priest with the Anglican Church of North America (ACNA).

A regular speaker at conferences for pastors and church leaders, Glenn has also taught seminars and classes at Durham University (Cranmer Hall), Denver Seminary, Calvin College, Samford University, and Trinity School for Ministry, and has preached at chapel services at Oxford University (Wycliffe Hall), Baylor University, Biola University, and Asbury Seminary. He has appeared on numerous podcasts and radio shows, and has contributed articles and devotional to Christianity Today, Our Daily Bread, Missio Alliance, and more.

Glenn was one of the founding leaders and songwriters for the Desperation Band and has been featured on several Desperation Band and NewLifeWorship recordings. He has also released three solo projects with Integrity Music, "The Mystery of Faith", "The Kingdom Comes", and "Rumors and Revelations". As a signed songwriter with Integrity Music, he has had the honor of writing and co-writing over 65 worship songs, including several well-loved songs, like "Your Name" and "My Savior Lives."

Glenn and his wife, Holly, have four children, and live in Orange County, California.

== Early and personal life ==
Packiam was born on February 27, 1978, in Petaling Jaya, Selangor, Malaysia, the son of a pastor, and lived there until leaving for Full Gospel Assembly as a member of their youth fellowship in Kuala Lumpur, Malaysia in 1993. He attended Oral Roberts University in Tulsa, Oklahoma, starting in 1996, where he graduated from in 1999, with his baccalaureate of arts in theological-historical studies, before leaving for Colorado Springs, Colorado in 2000. He took an associate pastor position in worship from the New Life Worship congregation, while he obtained his master's degree in management from ORU. Packiam was the lead pastor of New Life Downtown before he and the family moved to California in 2022. After studying at Fuller Theological Seminary for two years, he began earning his doctorate in theology at St John's College located at University of Durham, which he completed in 2018. He is married to Holly; they have four children and live in Colorado.

== Music history ==
His music recording career began in 2009, with the studio album, Rumors and Revelations, that was released on June 22, 2009, by Integrity Music. The subsequent release, an extended play, The Kingdom Comes, was released on May 28, 2011, from Integrity Music. He released, The Mystery of Faith, on March 5, 2013, with Integrity Music.

== Discography ==
Studio albums

- Rumors and Revelations (June 22, 2009, Integrity)

EPs

- The Kingdom Comes (May 28, 2011, Integrity)
- The Mystery of Faith (March 5, 2013, Integrity)

== Books ==
- Discover the Mystery of Faith
- Lucky: How the Kingdom comes to Unlikely People
- Secondhand Jesus: Trading Rumors of God for a Firsthand Faith
- Butterfly in Brazil: How Your Life Can Make a World of Difference
- Blessed Broken Given: How Your Story Becomes Sacred in the Hands of Jesus.
- The Intentional Year: Simple Rhythms for finding freedom, peace and purpose
- The Resilient Pastor: Leading Your Church in a Rapidly Changing World
