= Darrell Evans (musician) =

American musician (born 1968)

- Born: Darrell Patton Evans; October 6, 1968 (age 57); San Francisco, California, U.S.
- Origin: Austin, Texas, U.S.
- Genres: Worship, Christian pop, Christian rock
- Occupations: Musician, worship leader
- Instruments: Vocals, guitar
- Years active: 1997–present
- Labels: Hosanna!, Integrity, Vertical, Dream

Darrell Patton Evans (born October 6, 1968) is an American evangelical Christian musician and songwriter, known primarily for his contributions to contemporary Christian worship. He is known as the writer of songs like "Trading My Sorrows", "Let the River Flow", "Your Love Is Extravagant", "Redeemer, Savior Friend", "Freedom", and "Fields of Grace."

Influenced by the music of Bruce Springsteen and U2, his style of music is noted for its extensive use of free form composition, with several of his songs having been written spontaneously during concerts and worship times. Besides his music writing, he is an accomplished guitar player and singer.

== Biography ==
He was born in San Francisco, California, into a military family, where they moved frequently around the western United States and Europe. Evans was the oldest child of a practicing Catholic couple. He became a born-again Christian at a Leon Patillo concert in 1980 at eleven years old. He began worship leading at fourteen years old.

He was a student of LIFE Bible College in San Dimas, California, before relocating to Tulsa, Oklahoma, where he was a worship leader at Vineyard Church, while he learned evangelism at Oral Roberts University. He went to Reno, Nevada, after leaving Oral Roberts, where he took a worship leader position with University Family Fellowship, before again going back to Tulsa, Oklahoma, to lead worship at Open Bible Fellowship Church.

=== Music and ministry ===
Evans started honing his songwriting at fourteen years-old, eventually becoming known as the writer of songs like "Trading My Sorrows", "Let the River Flow", "Your Love Is Extravagant", "Redeemer, Savior Friend", "Freedom", and "Fields of Grace." He is considered by many to be a pioneer in the modern worship music movement.

Evans's ministry started as a teenager in Olympia, WA, playing spiritual music for classmates in his parents' home. He has served as a worship pastor for churches in Washington, California, Oklahoma and Texas.

For the past 17 years Darrell has traveled the world alone and with the band, combining music with worship, preaching, and prayer.

Darrell's projects "Let the River Flow" and "Freedom" both garnered Dove award nominations and influenced a new wave of congregational worship. A later project, "Nothing Less Than Everything", wraps his joy, passion and experience in a fresh and powerful sound. In Darrell's words, "It's my prayer that the Lord will use these songs to help people connect with Jesus in a life-changing way".

In 2013, Evans signed an exclusive publishing administration deal with Watershed Music Group, while continuing to release independent worship recording project.

== Personal life ==
Evans has five children: two daughters, Leah and Makenzie, and three sons, Connor, Zachary and Grayson. "They are my heart and world. My kids have changed my life for the better. I want to be the Godly father and leader that they need," Darrell said about his children.

== Discography ==
=== Albums ===
Title	Release date
Let the River Flow	1997
You Are I AM	1998
Freedom	1998
All I Want Is You	2002
Trading My Sorrows: The Best of Darrell Evans	2002
Consuming Fire	2004
Uncharted Waters	2005
Nothing Less than Everything	2008
Shade	2010
Darrell Evans Live/Acoustic	2010
Awesome God Is He	2013

=== Compilations ===
Album title	Release date	Songs
Our Heart	1998	Whom Shall I Fear
Only God for Me	1999	Trading My Sorrows
B.C./A.D.: Who Split Time?	1999	Redeemer, Savior, Friend (with Chris Springer)
Millennium Worship	1999	Trading My Sorrows; Redeemer, Savior, Friend (with Chris Springer); Whom Shall I Fear; Let the River Flow
The Smithton Outpouring	1999	Undignified; Redeemer, Savior, Friend (with Chris Springer)
Rock of Refuge: Acoustic Worship	2000	Your Love is Extravagant
Lighthouse Worship: Pray, Care, Share	2000	Your Love is Extravagant
Dove Award Worship: The Best of the '90s	2000	We Will Embrace Your Move
I Could Sing of Your Love Forever	2000	Trading My Sorrows
More Than Gold	2000	Trading My Sorrows; Whom Shall I Fear
Millennium Worship 2	2001	Undignified; Your Love is Extravagant
Open the Eyes of My Heart, Vol. 1	2001	Trading My Sorrows; So Good To Me; Walk into The Room
Absolute Worship	2004	All We Want is You
ORU Worship – Extraordinary	2006	Worthy; To The Lord; I Am Free (cover)
The Best of Revival Worship	2006	The Spirit of Revival; We Will Embrace Your Move
