= Vineyard Churches UK and Ireland =

Organisation of Christian churches

- Official Logo
- Formation: 1996
- Founder: John and Eleanor Mumford
- Location(s): United Kingdom and Ireland
- Website: www.vineyardchurches.org.uk

Vineyard Churches UK and Ireland (or VCUKI) is the national body for the Association of Vineyard Churches in the United Kingdom and Ireland. There are more than 100 churches under its direction. The organisation is both a registered charity (number 1099748) and a registered company (number 04839046).

== History ==
The Vineyard church was established in the UK by John and Eleanor Mumford. After visiting John Wimber in the US, the Mumfords returned to the UK to establish the first British Vineyard church, South West London Vineyard in 1987. VCUKI became its own national organisation in 1996, when it was released by the international body.

== Leadership and structure ==
The Vineyard Churches UK and Ireland is headed by its national directors, John and Debby Wright, who officially took over from John and Eleanor Mumford in September 2015. There is then a Leadership Council, with members responsible for different specialisms within the church (church planting, church development, and financial and legal issues).

In addition to the central leadership, the UK and Ireland are divided into 13 areas. Each area is run by Area Leaders, who are responsible for that area of the country. Areas tend to hold their own training and events for the local people, leaders and churches.

== Evaluation ==
One of the first academic studies of a Vineyard church in the United Kingdom was Cory E. Labanow's Evangelicalism and the Emerging Church: A Congregational Study of a Vineyard Church. Within the congregation studied ("Jacobsfield Vineyard"), there was a common identity as an "emerging church".

However, Labanow reports that the meaning of this common identity was contested within the congregation. Even more significantly, the decentralised, non-creedal nature of the Vineyard churches in the UK and the Republic of Ireland makes it such that one church cannot be seen to be representative of the whole of the Vineyard movement in the UK and Ireland.

== Controversies ==
There have been a number of accusations that the Vineyard organisation attracts narcissistic leaders.

=== Preceding events ===
- The Toronto Blessing events led by Randy Clark who claimed spiritual activity had taken root at the Toronto Airport Vineyard (TAV). This led to other church leaders publishing books questioning the claims (see: Counterfeit Revival). The Vineyard Association eventually removed its connection with the church.
- The Network was founded by Steve Morgan having broken away from the Vineyard Association. The Network's methods and practices have been criticized for being spiritually abusive, controlling, manipulative, and misogynistic.

=== Causeway Coast Vineyard ===
The founder and trustees of the Causeway Coast Vineyard in Northern Ireland have been the subject of a number of internal and external media investigations. Founder Alan Scott has been accused of having a messiah complex, and in 2023 several of his family members had to resign from leadership positions in the church following historic allegations of spiritual abuse.

The church's founders, Alan Scott and his wife, the famous worship leader, Kathryn Scott, had left and moved to Anaheim Vineyard, California, in 2018. Before Alan and Kathryn left, Kathryn's sister, Janet Young, along with her husband, Neil Young, were made joint senior pastors.

After Alan and Kathryn's departure, reports started to emerge that Alan had been an abusive leader in Northern Ireland. The trustees of the church eventually commissioned an independent report. In this, respondents alleged that Alan Scott had appeared ‘all knowing’ and that he had told them God would tell him if anybody spoke about him, even in their own homes, and that he knew people's sin by looking at them.

Neil and Janet Young resigned in 2023 as they could not support the findings of the trustee's independent report against their family members.

At the same time, in California, Anaheim Vineyard took Alan to court for fraud due to his decision to take the Anaheim church and its $62 million worth of assets out of the Vineyard movement. The Vineyard movement alleged that Alan had promised not to do this during the recruitment process, and they alleged he had been fraudulent in this promise.

Alan renamed the now independent Anaheim church 'Dwelling Place', where he remains as pastor. Similar concerns have continued at Dwelling Place under Scott, and in 2024 their worship leader was prohibited from attending a Christian conference following allegations of spiritual abuse while under Alan Scott's leadership at Dwelling Place.

In September 2024, the Charity Commission for Northern Ireland stepped in and have decided to run another investigation into the Causeway Coast Vineyard. The focus of this new probe is around the church's governance arrangements and its response to the allegations made against Alan and Kathryn Scott.

Like the senior leadership of the church, the trustee board is dominated by one family - the Lynas family - and their spouses. The Lynas family are one the wealthiest in the area, who own a major food distribution operation. The Chairperson, Peter Lynas, is also works for Evangelical Alliance, a controversial lobby group who have been criticised for their conservative stance on a range of issues.

=== Healing on the Streets ===
A leader within the Causeway Coast Vineyard, in Northern Ireland, Mark Marx, started a branch of the church called 'Healing on the Streets'. This organisation made promises to cure medical conditions through faith healing, first on the streets of Coleraine and then training other churches. These claims - including the claim they could heal cancer - have been challenged by the Advertising Standards Authority (ASA) who concluded that the claims were 'misleading'. This led to media stories around the Bath group, and the Nottingham group.

The Evangelical Alliance policy arm is led by Peter Lynas, who is also Chair of the Causeway Coast Vineyard board. Evangelical Alliance supported Mark Marx organisations and believes the regulations should not apply to the Healing on the Streets activities.

Mark Marx and Causeway Coast Vineyard founder Alan Scott have now moved together to Dwelling Place, California.
