= Brenton Brown =

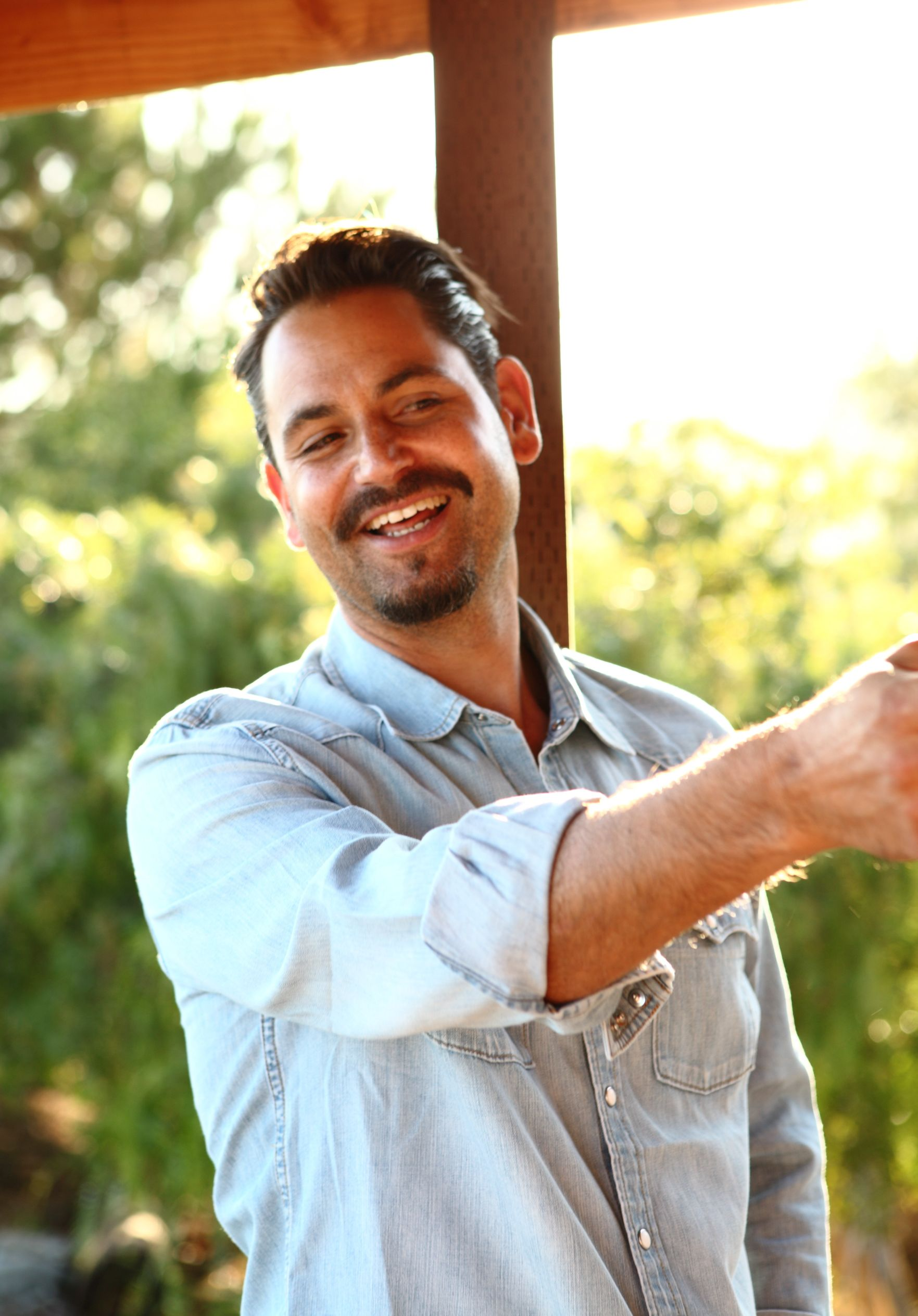

Background information
- Born: Brenton Gifford Brown; 1 July 1973 (age 53); Cape Town, South Africa
- Origin: Malibu, California, US
- Genres: Worship, CCM
- Occupation: Worship leader
- Years active: 1998–present
- Website: www.brentonbrownmusic.com

Brenton Gifford Brown (born 1 July 1973) is a dual South African and American Christian musician and worship leader.

== Career ==
Brown joined Vineyard Music (UK), serving as worship pastor at the Oxford Vineyard, UK, and eventually as coordinator of the Vineyard (UK) Worship Development Team. His songs, "Lord Reign in Me", "All Who Are Thirsty", "Humble King", "Hallelujah [Your Love is Amazing]" and "Holy", were recorded on the Vineyard UK projects during this time. Brown's career began in earnest with the release of Vineyard UK worship records' Come Now Is the Time, Hungry, Surrender and Holy.

In the 2000s, recording as a Kingsway artist, Brown co-penned and recorded "Hosanna (Praise Is Rising)", "Everlasting God", "Because of Your Love" and "God My Rock". Most recently, Brown's song "Soul on Fire", has been recorded by Third Day,

In 2006, he released his first solo album, Everlasting God released on Survivor Records in the UK and rest of the world, and with Sparrow Records in the United States and Canada. The title track, "Everlasting God" (co-written with Ken Riley from UK Christian Band YFriday), has been recorded by other artists, including Lincoln Brewster, Jeremy Camp, and most notably by Chris Tomlin on his 2006 album, See the Morning. Brown has appeared on numerous live and compilation albums, including events such as Hope 2008 and Mission:Worship. He released his second solo album, Because of Your Love, in 2008.

In 2009, Brown was signed to Kingsway Communications and released the EP Introducing Brenton Brown, in October 2009. Followed in 2010 with full-length album, Adoration, which contained many of the songs from his independent release "Because of Your Love" plus the new song "A Thousand Stars". Later in 2010, Brown released his first album of all new material on Kingsway: Our God Is Near. He released his first live solo record, God My Rock, in 2012. The record was recorded at a Dare2share event in Dayton, Ohio and included six new songs as well as some of Brown's songs including "Hosanna (Praise is Rising)" and "Everlasting God". It was released by Integrity Music.

The song "Lion and the Lamb", co-written with Leeland Mooring and Brian Johnson was included on Bethel Music's Have It All (2016).

== Personal life ==
Brown and his wife both suffer with chronic fatigue syndrome. He lives in Malibu, California with his wife and two daughters. After their home and most of their possessions were destroyed by a wildfire in November 2018, the Browns moved to Nashville, Tennessee. The Browns returned to Malibu in June 2023 and attend Malibu Pacific Church.

== Discography ==
=== Vineyard music albums ===
- Come Now Is the Time (1998)
- Hungry (1999)
- Surrender (2000)
- I Love Your Presence (2000)
- Holy (2001)
- Humble King (2002)
- Songs 4 Worship: The UK Collection (2003)
- Lord Reign in Me (2003)
- Turn It All Down (2006)

=== Solo albums ===
- Everlasting God (2006)
- Because of Your Love (2008)
- Our God is Near (2010)
- Adoration (2010)
- God My Rock (2012)

=== Kingsway/Integrity ===
- Adoration (2010)
- Our God Is Near (2010; 2011 US)
- God My Rock (Live) (2012)

=== EPs ===
- Introducing Brenton Brown (2009)
- Impossible Things (2018)
