= Paul Baloche =

American Christian musician and worship leader

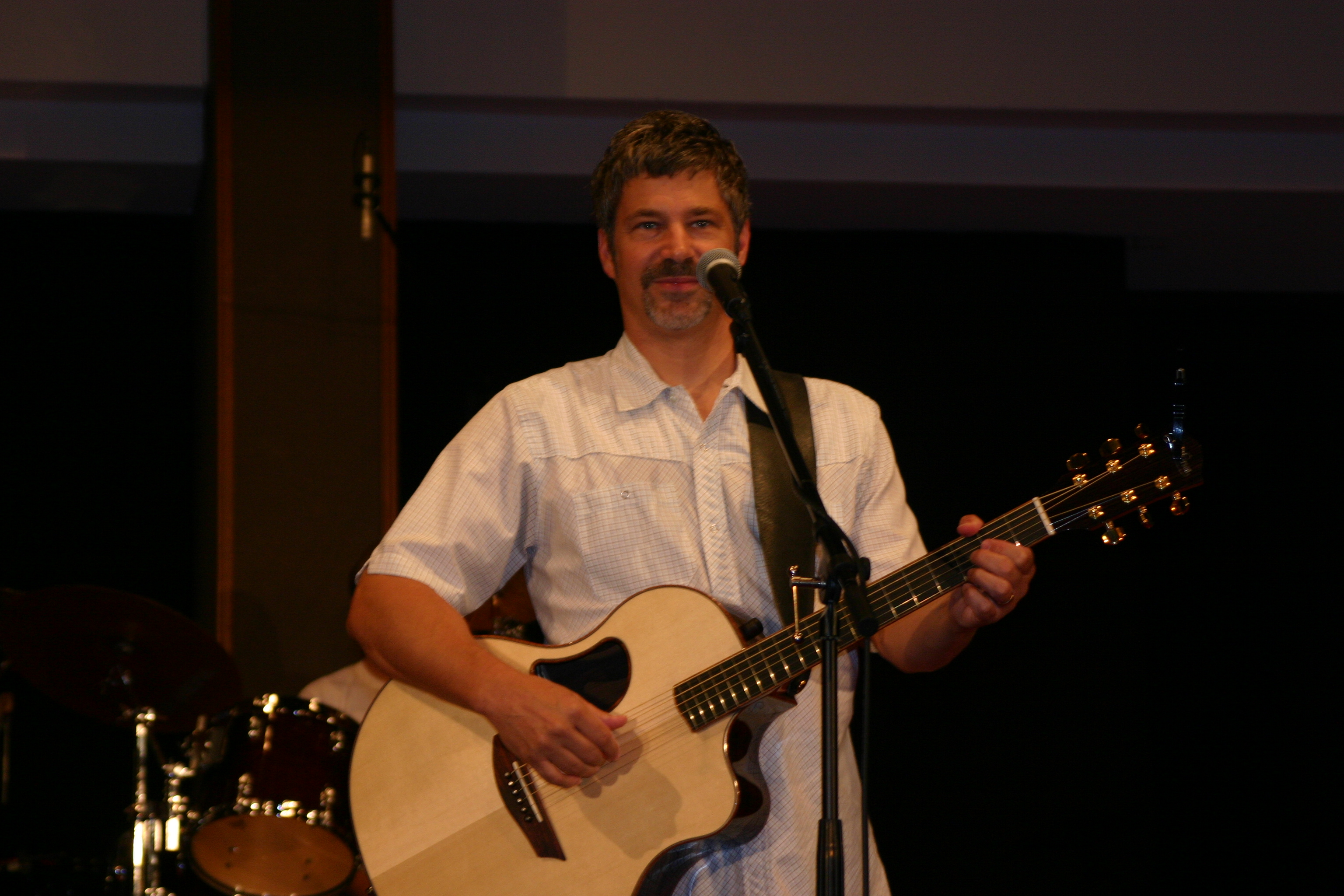
- Paul Baloche in concert in 2007

Background information
- Born: Paul Joseph Baloche; June 4, 1962 (age 64)
- Origin: Camden, New Jersey, U.S.
- Genres: Worship; contemporary Christian
- Occupations: Worship leader; songwriter; singer
- Instruments: Vocals; guitar; piano
- Years active: 1998–present
- Label: Integrity
- Website: leadworship.com

Paul Joseph Baloche (/bəˈlɒʃ/ bə-LOSH; born on June 4, 1962) is an American Christian music artist, worship leader, and singer-songwriter. He was the worship pastor at Community Christian Fellowship in Lindale, Texas, for 26 years. Some of Baloche's songs rank among the most-performed songs in services according to CCLI.

== Biography ==
A native of Maple Shade Township, New Jersey, Paul Baloche was born on June 4, 1962, in Camden, New Jersey in a French Canadian Catholic family. He studied at the Grove School of Music in Los Angeles.

=== Career ===
In 1989, he became a worship pastor at the Community Christian Fellowship Church in Lindale, Smith County, Texas, until 2015 when he moved to New York City.

Top-ranked songs include "Open the Eyes of My Heart", "Hosanna", "Your Name", "Today Is the Day", and "Above All". Baloche has received numerous Dove Awards over the years. His song "Above All" was nominated for Song of the Year in both the 2002 and 2003 Dove Awards, and in 2002, Michael W. Smith's version of the same song won Inspirational Recorded Song of the Year. Baloche was also nominated for Songwriter of the Year in 2002. In 2009, Baloche won a Dove Award for Inspiration Recorded Song of the Year as co-author of "A New Hallelujah" with Michael W. Smith and his wife Debbie Smith.

Baloche has been a pioneer in providing visual instructional resources for church worship teams. In 1995, he released The Worship Guitar Series, a set of three videos. Between 2002 and 2006, he released The Modern Worship Series, a set of eight instructional DVDs focused on helping church worship teams increase their skill and confidence. In 2005, he released the book God Songs, a practical resource for worship songwriters, currently in its 8th printing.

His catalog of twelve albums is focused on providing worship music for churches to use in their Sunday morning services. His albums are released by his publisher Integrity Music. In addition to songwriting, Baloche participates in several seminars for worship leaders and musicians throughout North America and Asia.

The 2006 release A Greater Song is a live recording featuring songs by Baloche, some co-written with worship artists including Matt Redman ("A Greater Song") and former Integrity Music president Don Moen ("Thank You Lord").

The 2009 release Glorious featured the single "Just to Be With You", which Baloche explained "is simply about intimacy with God." On April 3, 2012 Baloche released album The Same Love featuring the single "The Same Love".

On October 29, 2013, Baloche also released a live Christmas worship album featured old and new songs suitable for use during the Christmas season. In November 2013, Baloche won a GMA Canada Covenant Award for International Album of the Year for Glorieux, a French language worship album.

Some of Baloche's songs rank among the most-performed songs in services according to CCLI. Numerous artists have performed Baloche's songs, including Michael W. Smith, Casting Crowns, Rebecca St. James, Phillips, Craig and Dean, Anthony Evans, and Sonicflood. Baloche has co-written songs with Aaron Shust, Kari Jobe, Meredith Andrews, and Lincoln Brewster for use on their respective albums.

Baloche composes on piano and acoustic guitar, favoring guitar when leading worship. Baloche is one of the writers for Compassionart, a charity founded by Martin Smith from Delirious?.

== Personal life ==
His wife, Rita Baloche, is also a Christian songwriter. Baloche has a son, David, with whom he has collaborated on the 2017 album Labyrinth. He also has a daughter, Chérie, who sang in the worship band at their church in Texas.

== Discography ==
- First Love (1998)
- Open the Eyes of My Heart (2000)
- God of Wonders (2001)
- Offering of Worship (2003)
- A Greater Song (2006)
- Our God Saves (2007)
- The Writer's Collection (2008)
- Ouvre les yeux de mon coeur (2008) – French version of Open the Eyes of My Heart
- Live in Asia (2009) (Recorded live in Seoul, South Korea)
- Glorious (2009)
- The Same Love (2012)
- Glorieux (2013) – French version of Glorious
- Christmas Worship (live) (2013)
- Live (2014)
- Uw Naam (2015)
- Christmas Worship, Vol. 2 (2015)
- Your Mercy (2016)
- For Unto Us: Christmas Worship Live From London (2017)
- Ultimate Collection (2018)
- Behold Him (2020)
- The Paul Baloche Collection (2023)
- Yes, We Believe (2026)

== Videography ==
- Worship Guitar Series – Volume 1 (VHS – 1995)
- Worship Guitar Series – Volume 2 (VHS – 1998)
- Worship Guitar Series – Electric Guitar (VHS – 2000)
- Visual Songbook – God of Wonders (CD-ROM – 2000)
- Modern Worship Series – Music Styles (DVD – 2003)
- Modern Worship Series – Worship Band Workshop (DVD – 2003)
- Modern Worship Series – Leading Worship: Creating Flow (DVD – 2003)
- Paul Baloche DVD Songbook Volume 1 (Songbook + DVD – 2003)
- Modern Worship Series – Music Theory Made Easy (DVD – 2005)
- Modern Worship Series – Acoustic Guitar (DVD – 2006)
- Paul Baloche DVD Songbook Volume 2 (Songbook + DVD – 2006)
- Modern Worship Series – Electric Guitar (DVD – 2007)
- Modern Worship Series – Worship Vocal Workshop (DVD – 2007)
- Modern Worship Series – Beginning Guitar (DVD – 2008)
- Glorious – CD Companion Video (DVD – 2010)
- The Worship Series – Leading Worship: Pastoring people and developing skill (DVD – 2011)
- The Worship Series – Worship Band Workshop (DVD – 2011)
- The Worship Series – The Journey of a Song (DVD – 2011)
- The Same Love – CD Companion Video (DVD – 2012)

== Books ==
- God Songs (ISBN 1-933150-03-3)
