= Kathryn Scott (singer) =

- Born: 29 September 1974 (age 52); Eastbourne, England
- Origin: Portstewart, Northern Ireland
- Genres: Worship music, contemporary Christian
- Occupations: Singer, songwriter, worship leader
- Years active: 1998–present
- Labels: Vertical; Vineyard Music; Integrity; Watershed Music Group
- Website: kathrynscott.org

Kathryn Sarah Scott (born 29 September 1974) is a contemporary worship music songwriter and worship leader from Northern Ireland.

Along with her husband, Alan Scott, Kathryn was a founding member of the Causeway Coast Vineyard Church.

Kathryn has written songs such as "Hungry", "At the Foot of the Cross", and "Search Me" for the worshipping church. She released her first album, Satisfy, in 2004, and followed it up with I Belong in 2007 and We Still Believe in 2010. She returned in 2020 with Speak to Me, released in partnership with Watershed Music Group. The worship experience was recorded live at Causeway Coast Vineyard in Northern Ireland, which was produced by Martin Smith (Integrity Music) and features both Martin and his daughter Elle Limebear (Provident Label Group).

Scott was born in Eastbourne, England and was brought up in Northern Ireland in a Christian environment. After getting married in 1996, Scott met and began to be mentored by Brian Doerksen, then a mentor of worship leaders from Vineyard Churches UK and Ireland, and as a result, Scott's songs feature on many of the Vineyard Records UK albums, including Hungry, Surrender and Come, Now is the Time.

Scott was one of the leading contributors to Hungry, one of the most influential albums in international contemporary worship music. Released in 1999 by Vineyard Records UK, it contains two of her self-penned songs (including the title track) and another with her writing credits. Scott, one of five worship leaders on the album, sings on seven of the songs, two alongside another of the worship leaders on the album.

Her first solo album Satisfy, contains a dozen songs; seven of which Scott penned. It was recorded in 2003 and released on 21 May 2004 by Vertical Records.

She and her husband, Alan, serve as pastors of Dwelling Place Anaheim, a church in California.

== Discography ==
=== Vineyard Records UK collaborative albums ===
- Come Now Is the Time (1998)
- Hungry (1999)
- Surrender (2000)
- I Love Your Presence (2001)
- You and You Alone (2002)
- Lord Reign In Me (2003)

=== Solo ===
- Satisfy (2004)
- I Belong (2007)
- Live Worship at FocusFest (2008)
- We Still Believe (2010)
- Sing on the Battlefield (EP) (2014)
- Speak to Me (live) (2020)

=== Singles ===
- "At the Foot of the Cross"/"Old Rugged Cross" (2012)
