= Integrity Music =

US record label

- Industry: Music & entertainment
- Founded: 1987 (as Integrity Music)
- Headquarters: Franklin, Tennessee
- Parent: David C. Cook
- Website: integritymusic.com

Integrity Music is part of the David C. Cook nonprofit group. Founded as a direct-to-consumer music club in 1987 as Integrity Music, Integrity was at the forefront of contemporary worship music's widespread popularity of praise and worship music. Integrity publishes many of the top songs in the Church, including "We Believe" (Newsboys). The label has also translated albums into Spanish, Mandarin, Hindi, Indonesian, Cantonese, Russian, Dutch, French and Portuguese.

== History ==
Integrity Music was founded in 1987 as Integrity's Hosanna! Music by Ed Lindquist and Mike Coleman with the purchase of the music division of Integrity Communications, owned by Charles Simpson Ministries. The Hosanna! Music tape series was operating out of New Wine Magazine as a subscription of Praise and Worship recordings and was purchased as the magazine folded in January 1987. Charles Simpson was a member of the Shepherding Movement and pastor of Covenant Church of Mobile.

Since July 1985, the label and its predecessor has produced the popular Hosanna! Music series of praise and worship music which started with the release of Behold His Majesty, with worship leader Ron Tucker. Behold His Majesty was originally recorded in St. Louis by Tom Brooks in 1983 and re-released under the Hosanna! label in 1985 as the first of the tape series. Tom Brooks was the long-time producer, arranger, and keyboardist on the tapes.

By 1995 the firm was publicly traded on Nasdaq under the symbol ITGR. In 2001, Integrity started Integrity Publishers. The company changed its name in 2002 to Integrity Media to better reflect its move into other markets. Also in 2002, the firm purchased the Nashville-based record label INO Records. This added to their artist roster, which already included Don Moen, Hillsong Music, Paul Baloche, and Israel and New Breed. The label also released the soundtrack to the film The Passion of the Christ and the Time-Life-advertised Songs 4 Worship collections. In 2004, co-founder and chairman Michael Coleman took Integrity private., While the company worked with FamilyTreeMedia on a home video series called "Baby Faith", including six stories of an infant's version of the Holy Bible, hosted by award-nominated actress and singer Jodi Benson.

In 2005, Integrity Music and INO Records began distribution through Sony BMG as part of the Provident Label Group. In 2006, Integrity Publishers was sold to Thomas Nelson.

Integrity also sells music, film and digital media via direct mail and Internet sales, as well as direct mail greeting cards through DaySpring/Hallmark.

In 2011, Integrity Media sold Integrity Music to ministry company David C. Cook. Integrity Music now resides in the greater Nashville area.
