= Starfield discography =

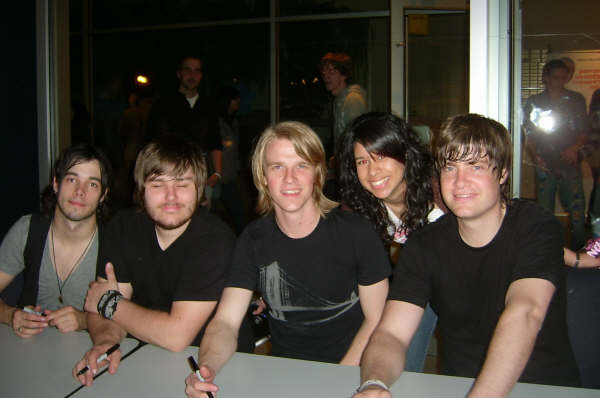
- David Crisp, Gordie Cochran, Jon Neufeld, a fan, Tim Neufeld
- Studio albums: 5
- Extended plays: 1
- Compilation albums: 1

This is a discography article of Canadian Christian music group Starfield.

== Albums ==
=== Studio albums ===
| Title | Album details | Peak positions | | |
| Title | Album details | US 200 | US Christ | US Heat |
|---|---|---|---|---|
| Starfield | Release date: May 18, 2004; Label: Sparrow | — | — | — |
| Beauty in the Broken | Release date: May 16, 2006; Label: Sparrow | — | 31 | 45 |
| I Will Go | Release date: March 25, 2008; Label: Sparrow | 179 | 7 | — |
| The Saving One | Release date: February 23, 2010; Label: Sparrow | — | 14 | — |
| The Kingdom | Release date: January 31, 2012; Label: Tone Tree Music | — | — | — |
"—" denotes releases that did not chart or were not released

=== Independent and compilation albums ===
| Title | Release details | Notes |
|---|---|---|
| Starfield | 1st independent album; Release date: 2001 | |
| Tumbling After | 2nd independent album; Release date: 2003; Label: CMC Distribution | only released in Canada |
| Starfield: Double Take | 1st dual album; Release date: March 20, 2007; Label: Sparrow | combination of Starfield and Beauty in the Broken |

== Extended plays ==
| Title | Release details |
|---|---|
| My Generation | Release date: March 21, 2006<; Label: Sparrow |

== Singles ==
| Year | Single | Peak chart positions | Album |
| Year | Single | US Christ | Album |
|---|---|---|---|
| 2004 | "Filled with Your Glory" | 30 | Starfield |
| 2004 | "Love Break Me" | — | Starfield |
| 2006 | "My Generation" | — | Beauty in the Broken |
| 2006 | "Son of God" (featuring Chris Tomlin) | 40 | Beauty in the Broken |
| 2006 | "Everything Is Beautiful" | 14 | Beauty in the Broken |
| 2008 | "Hosanna" | — | I Will Go |
| 2008 | "Reign in Us" | — | I Will Go |
| 2010 | "Rediscover You" | 43 | The Saving One |
"—" denotes releases that did not chart

== Album appearances ==
| Year | Track | Album |
|---|---|---|
| 2004 | "Filled with Your Glory" | Sea to Sea: Filled With Your Glory |
| 2004 | "Love Break Me" | DIM (Now We See Dimly) |
| 2004 | "40" | In the Name of Love: Artists United for Africa |
| 2005 | "Alive in This Moment" | Sea to Sea: I See the Cross |
| 2006 | "Revolution" | 27th Annual Covenant Hits |
| 2006 | "Son of God" | Sea to Sea: For Endless Days |
| 2007 | "The Hand That Holds the World" | YourMusicZone.com #1s |
| 2007 | "Obsession" | X Worship 2007 |
| 2008 | "My Generation" | 28th Annual Covenant Hits |
| 2008 | "Filled with Your Glory" | GMA Canada Presents 30th Anniversary Collection |
| 2008 | "Glorious One" | Sea to Sea: The Voice of Creation |
| 2008 | "Hosanna" | Canada Rocks |
| 2008 | "Hosanna" | Everlasting God: 25 Modern Worship Favorites |
| 2009 | "Filled with Your Glory" | Run & Worship |
| 2009 | "Remain" | The Best New Praise & Worship Album Ever |
| 2010 | "Filled with Your Glory" | Acoustic Playlist: Bold |

== Other appearances ==
| Year | Artist | Album | Track | Notes |
|---|---|---|---|---|
| 2009 | David John Hensman | Find Me/Blessed Are the Lost Ones | "Author of Our Faith" | Nominated for 2009 GMA Canada Covenant Award, as Modern Worship Song of the Year |
| 2009 | David John Hensman | Find Me/Blessed Are the Lost Ones | "King of Love" | |
