= Starfield =

Starfield may refer to:

- Starfield (astronomy), a set of stars visible in an arbitrarily-sized field of view
- Starfield (video game), a 2023 game by Bethesda Game Studios
- Starfield (band), a Canadian Christian music group
  - Starfield (album)
- Starfield, a brand of guitars by Ibanez
- Starfield Technologies, American tech company
- Starfield, Missouri, a community in the United States
- Starfield (shopping mall), a South Korean shopping mall
- Barbara Starfield (1932–2011), American pediatrician
