= Riley Armstrong =

Riley Armstrong is the name of:

- Riley Armstrong (ice hockey) (born 1984), Canadian hockey player
- Riley Armstrong (musician) (born 1976), Canadian Christian singer and songwriter
  - Riley Armstrong (album), the eponymously named music album by Riley Armstrong
