= Son of God (disambiguation) =

Son of God is a title historically claimed by several figures to imply their divinity, and used in various religious contexts.

Son of God may also refer to:

- Son of God (Christianity), the title's use in Christianity to refer to Jesus
  - God the Son, a closely related title, also refers to Jesus
- Sons of God, a phrase used in the Hebrew Bible and in Christian apocrypha, referring especially to angels
- Son of God (TV series), a British television series
- Son of God, a song by Starfield from the 2006 album Beauty in the Broken
- Son of God (album), a 2012 album by Young Noble
- Son of God (film), a 2014 American film

== See also ==
- Divi filius, a Latin phrase meaning "divine son"
- Son of the Gods, a 1930 American film
