= Steve Bell (musician) =

Steve Bell CM OM
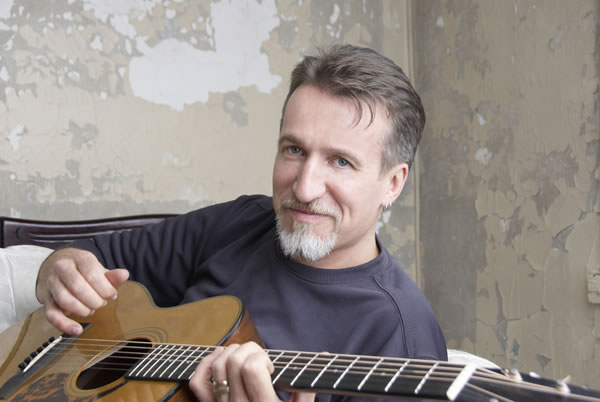
- Bell in 2009

Background information
- Born: November 17, 1960 (age 65); Calgary, Alberta, Canada
- Origin: Winnipeg, Manitoba, Canada
- Genre: Folk
- Occupations: Performer, songwriter, producer
- Instruments: Guitar, vocals
- Label: Signpost
- Website: www.stevebell.com

Steve Bell, C.M.,O.M., (born November 17, 1960) is a Canadian singer/songwriter and guitarist based in Winnipeg, Manitoba, Canada. He is among the best-known Christian musicians in Canada and is an accomplished songwriter and record producer. Before embarking on his solo career he was a long-time member of the group Elias, Schritt and Bell. In 1989, Bell founded the independent recording label Signpost Music along with Dave Zeglinski, long-time friend and co-producer. His first solo album, Comfort My People, was released on Signpost that same year. Bell now has twenty albums to his credit. Among his many awards are two Junos, several GMA Canada Covenant Awards and the 2012 Queen Elizabeth II Diamond Jubilee Medal.

== Musical career ==
Steve Bell has been performing music since childhood. His recording career began at 13 when his family's gospel band, The Alf Bell Family Singers, recorded an LP. The album contains some of his earliest songwriting. After graduating from high school he was a member of a succession of bands playing a number of different musical genres. For three years he played with the secular folk trio Elias, Schritt and Bell, along with Tim Elias and John Schritt. The group released one commercial studio album, Awakening, in 1982. Bell quit the band and performed with various artists (Rocki Rolletti, Rhonda Hart, Byron O'Donnell, Bob King) until 1988 when he withdrew from performing. It was during this period that his childhood Christian faith became reanimated and over a six-month period wrote most of the material for his first four solo projects. Faced with a lack of interest from established labels he formed the Indie record label Signpost Music in 1989 and released his first solo album. The first edition of Comfort My People comprised 300 Cassettes.

Bell has gone on to release twenty solo albums, selling over 400,000 copies independently. His tours have taken him all over North America and the world (2000+ concerts). In 1994 Signpost Music received a boost when Bell became business partners with his co-producer Dave Zeglinski. Bell was the Juno Awards' first winner in the Best Gospel Album category in 1998. That category was created from the former Blues/Gospel Album category, which represented the industry's recognition of Contemporary Christian Music in Canada.

Since then, Bell has gone on to release 20 albums, 4 concert DVDs, 5 songbooks, a co-authored book on the Psalms, and a 7-book series on the Christian calendar called Pilgrim Year. His work has earned him two JUNOs, four Western Canadian Music Awards, three Prairie Music Awards, eleven Gospel Music Association Covenant Awards (including Male Vocalist of the Year, Recorded Song of the Year, Album of the Year, and the 2018 Lifetime Achievement Award), and many more nominations. He has won three Word Awards for his poetry, song lyrics, and magazine articles. Bell's most recent feature-length album, Where the Good Way Lies (released on LP and DVD) included collaborations with local Indigenous singers Ray “Coco” Stevenson and Fresh I.E., was nominated for a 2017 JUNO Award for Contemporary Christian/Gospel Album of the Year.

In 2006 Bell was invited to perform with the Winnipeg Symphony Orchestra. Scores were created by jazz pianist and composer Mike Janzen. Since then, Bell has performed 30 sold-out or capacity-crowd concerts with symphonies across Canada and the United States. Bell's concert DVD, Steve Bell in Concert with the Edmonton Symphony Orchestra, won a 2009 International Christian Visual Media Gold Crown Award for Best Music Video. For his "skill, his musicality, for his connection with the symphony, and for his openness" Steve was awarded the Winnipeg Symphony Golden Baton Award in 2013.

In 2014, Bell was the subject of a documentary by Refuge31 Films entitled Burning Ember: The Steve Bell Journey, for which a film crew followed Steve across North America to chronicle the many ups and downs of life in the music industry. The documentary has won numerous awards and has been broadcast in Canada (CBC's Documentary Channel) and worldwide.

=== Advocacy ===
Amidst his regular touring schedule, Bell has worked on behalf of aid organizations such as World Vision, Compassion Canada, and the Canadian Foodgrains Bank. His advocacy efforts have helped raise awareness and significant financial support. A close association with the National Roundtable on Homelessness and Poverty has helped draw attention to the plight of Canada's marginalized. Having traveled extensively in the Third World, Bell spreads hope via his music and message to communities in India, Thailand, Bangladesh, the Philippines, Ethiopia, Palestine, Kenya, Guatemala, and many other countries.

In recent years, Bell has used his platform to advocate for the building of Freedom Road, a 27-kilometre road that ended a century of isolation for the people of Shoal Lake 40 First Nation. He has also been a strong voice urging the Canadian government to adopt Bill C-262, an act that would ensure that Canadian laws are in harmony with the United Nations Declaration on the Rights of Indigenous Peoples. Bell's "effort for the sake of Indigenous communities" which has "brought together many Indigenous, church, political and other groups of people, including students," was a major impetus for Canadian Mennonite University's selection of him as their 2018 CMU PAX Award recipient. Crandall University also presented Bell with their 2017 Leadership Award "for an extraordinary career of sustained artistic excellence, spiritual vitality, and open-handed generosity to others."

== Works ==
=== Discography ===
Awakening (as Elias, Schritt and Bell)

- Released: 1982
- Tracks: "Awakening", "Feelin' Just Fine?", "Jenny", "Once in a While", "Never Too Late", "Wipe the Tears", "Kristy", "So Long", "Maureen", "Help Me Lord"

Comfort My People (review)

- Released: 1989
- Label: Signpost
- Producer: Steve Bell
- Tracks: "Psalm 90", "Comfort My People", "Amen, Listen to Our Prayer", "Jenny", "You Are to Be Holy", "Ride On, King Jesus", "Shepherd of Life", "The Lord Has Done Great Things", "You Are Near", "The Lord's Prayer"

Deep Calls to Deep

- Released: 1992
- Label: Signpost
- Producer: John Paul O'Neill
- Tracks: "Wings of an Eagle", "Why Do We Hunger for Beauty", "Hear Our Prayer", "Faith's Song", "Cashe Island", "Fashion for Me", "Deep Calls to Deep", "What A Longing", "Marie", "Blessed are the Poor", "The Wellspring / Holy Lord"

Burning Ember (review)

- Released: 1994
- Label: Signpost
- Producer: Steve Bell, Dave Zeglinski
- Tracks: "Dakota Hymn", "As Long As the Sun", "Psalm 40", "Never Mind", "How Long", "House of Peace", "Song for the Life", "So Long", "She's In Love With Me", "I Will Not Be Shaken", "Burning Ember", "Psalm 32", "Even So Lord Jesus Come"

The Feast of Seasons (Christmas seasonal; review)

- Released: 1995
- Label: Signpost, Rhythm House (US)
- Producer: Steve Bell, Dave Zeglinski
- Tracks: "Ready My Heart", "May It Be Done", "Magnificat (Holy Is His Name)", "The Angel Gabriel", "Come Thou Long Expected Jesus", "God Rest Ye Merry Gentlemen / Angels We Have Heard On High / Silent Night (Instrumental)", "The Coventry Carol", "O Holy Night", "I Heard the Bells", "Every Stone Shall Cry", "Home Again (Old Sage)", "The Coventry Carol (Reprise)"

Romantics & Mystics (review)

- Released: 1997
- Label: Signpost
- Producer: Steve Bell, Dave Zeglinski
- Tracks: "Dark Night of the Soul", "Here By the Water", "Remember Me", "Alone Tonight", "Drumheller Circle", "All for a Loveless Night", "Moon Over Birkenau", "Lament for a Nation", "Keeping Vigil", "This Is Love", "Can I Go With You", "Let's Do It Again"

Beyond a Shadow (review)

- Released: 1999
- Label: Signpost, Rhythm House (US)
- Producer: Steve Bell, John Paul O'Neill, Dave Zeglinski
- Tracks: "Here By the Water", "Remember Me", "Wings of An Eagle", "Psalm 40", "Never Mind", "How Long", "Burning Ember", "Drumheller Circle", "Ride On, King Jesus", "Shepherd of Life", "The Wellspring", "Holy Lord", "This Is Love"

Steve Bell Band Live in Concert (US version titled Each Rare Moment; review)

- Released: 1999
- Label: Signpost, Rhythm House (US)
- Producer: Steve Bell, Dave Zeglinski
- Tracks: "Ready My Heart", "Comfort My People", "Burning Ember", "Hear Our Prayer", "The Wellspring", "Holy Lord", "Wings of An Eagle", "I Feel the Winds of God Today", "The Story of Drumheller Circle", "Drumheller Circle", "Shepherd of Life", "Here By the Water", "Come Home", "Deep Calls to Deep"

Simple Songs (review)

- Released: 2000
- Label: Signpost
- Producer: Steve Bell, Dave Zeglinski
- Tracks: "God Our Protector", "Home", "High Above the Fray", "Fox Glove", "All the Diamonds", "Down the Way", "Done Made My Vow", "What Kind of Love Is This", "Unto the Least of These", "Fresh and Green", "Peace Prayer", "Come Thou Long Expected Jesus / Be Thou My Vision / Great Is Thy Faithfulness", "We Come", "For the Journey"

Waiting for Aidan (review)

- Released: 2001
- Label: Signpost
- Producer: Steve Bell, Dave Zeglinski
- Tracks: "Eventide", "Jesus My Glory", "Pleasing to You", "Somebody's Gotta Pay", "Restless", "The Water Runs", "Diamonds From the Other Side", "Waiting for Aidan", "A Sorrow for Connoisseurs", "Oh Love", "Psalm 121", "Stay Awake", "Eventide (Reprise)"

Sons & Daughters (with daughter Sarah Bell)

- Released: 2003
- Label: Signpost
- Producer: Steve Bell, Dave Zeglinski
- Tracks: "In the Morning", "Hosea (Come Back to Me)", "Ever Present Need", "We Believe In Love", "I'll Fly Away", "Psalm 116", "Getting Ready for Glory", "Everything's Lies", "Air Jam", "Subtle Shiver", "Lauds", "The 59th Street Bridge Song (Feelin' Groovy)"
- Bonus tracks: "Rain Song"

Solace for Seasons of Suffering (review)

- Released: 2005
- Label: Signpost
- Director: Steve Bell, Dave Zeglinski
- Tracks: "Psalm 90", "God Our Protector", "Remember Me", "Burning Ember", "Shepherd of Life", "How Long", "Dark Night of the Soul", "Moon Over Birkenau", "Ever Present Need", "Wings of An Eagle", "Hear Our Prayer", "Deep Calls to Deep", "For the Journey", "Hymn Medley"

My Dinner with Bruce (reviews)

- Released: 2006
- Label: Signpost
- Producer: Steve Bell, Dave Zeglinski
- Tracks: "Lord of the Starfields", "Wondering Where the Lions Are", "Red Brother Red Sister", "Going to the Country", "All the Ways I Want You", "The Coming Rains", "Thoughts On A Rainy Afternoon", "Pacing the Cage", "Southland of the Heart", "Closer to the Light", "My Lady and My Lord", "God Bless the Children", "Love Loves You Too"

Story and Song (vol. 1) (review)

- Released: 2006
- Label: Signpost
- Producer: Dave Zeglinski
- Tracks: "Intro", "Psalm 40", "Fat and Flourishing", "Fresh and Green", "Go Forth and Multiply", "Marie", "Romance and Reality", "That's Alright With Me", "Censoring the Laments", "How Long", "Pick Up the Phone", "In Closing", "Lauds"

Symphony Sessions (reviews)

- Released: 2007
- Label: Signpost
- Producer: Steve Bell, Dave Zeglinski
- Tracks: "Burning Ember", "Deep Calls to Deep", "Dark Night of the Soul", "Here By the Water", "Even So Lord Jesus Come", "Moon Over Birkenau", "This Is Love", "Pleasing to You", "Waiting for Aidan", "Lord of the Starfields", "The Wellspring", "Holy Lord", "Eventide"

Devotion (worship album; review)

- Released: 2008
- Label: Signpost
- Producer: Roy Salmond
- Tracks: "Almighty God", "Everything We Need", "He Will Know", "Praise the Father", "Gone Is the Light", "Embrace the Mystery", "Jesus Feed Us", "Who Condemns You Now", "The Lorica", "Benediction", "Praise the Father (String Mix)", "Gone Is the Light (String Mix)"

Kindness

- Released: February 10, 2011
- Label: Signpost
- Tracks: "About Love", "Kindness", "Changes", "Good Friend", "Absalom, Absalom", "These are the Ones", "In Billy's Wake", "Stubble and Hay", "Birth of a Song", "Greatest Gift", "Gifting and the Giver", "Was it a Morning Like This"

Keening for the Dawn (Meditations on Advent, Christmastide and Epiphany)

- Released: October 15, 2012
- Label: Signpost
- Tracks: "Oracles", "Keening for the Dawn", "Fashion for Me", "Peace Be Unto You", O Come, O Come Emmanuel", "While Shepherds Watched", "In the Bleak Midwinter", "Glory", "Descent", "Refugee", "Epiphany on the Jordan"

Pilgrimage (A Four Disc Box Set Celebrating 25 Years; Includes Essay by John Stackhouse Jr.)

- Released: October 1, 2014
- Label: Signpost
- Tracks: "Think About That", "Big Mistake", "Lenten Lands", "Turn It Around", "Wayfaring Stranger", "Mercy Now", "Mary (Theotokos)", "Borrowed Shoes", "Long Love", "Pop-Pop and the Lads", "The Riddle Song (Long, Long Journey)", "Felix Culpa"

I Will Not Be Shaken: Psalms Collection (A companion to the book "I Will Not Be Shaken: A Songwriter's Journey Through the Psalms" by Jamie Howison and Steve Bell)

- Released: 2015
- Label: Signpost
- Tracks: "Psalm 90", "Psalm 23 (Shepherd of Life)", "Psalm 126 (The Lord Has Done Great Things)", "Psalm 72 & 131 (As Long as the Sun)", "Psalm 13 (How Long)", "Psalm 40", "Psalm 16 (I Will Not Be Shaken)", "Psalm 32", "Psalm 25 (Remember Me)", "Psalm 84 (God Our Protector)", "Psalm 113 (High Above the Fray)", "Psalm 92 (Fresh and Green)", "Psalm 3 (Jesus My Glory)", "Psalm 19 (Pleasing to You)", "Psalm 8 & Hebrews 1 (Oh Love)", "Psalm 116", "Psalm 70:1"

Where the Good Way Lies (released on LP and CD)

- Released: October 13, 2016
- Label: Signpost
- Tracks: "Bring It On", "Love Song", "Where the Good Way Lies", "And We Dance", "Bethany in the Morning", "Wait Alone in Stillness", "Freedom Road", "A Better Resurrection", "Let Beauty Awake", "Love is Our Way", "Ash Wednesday", "O Love (Come to Us)", "Judy's Garden"

Wouldn't You Love to Know? (released on LP and CD)

- Released: 2020
- Label: Signpost
- Tracks: "Wouldn't You Love to Know?", "In Praise of Decay", "God Bless The Poor", "The Strange Blessing of Bearing", "In Memoriam", "A Heartbeat Away", "Because I Languish for Love", "The Home of Our God", "Long Shadows", "Because We Hunkered Down", "Do Not Judge", "Together"

=== Bibliography ===
- I Will Not Be Shaken: A Songwriter's Journey Through the Psalms (co-written with Jamie Howison), published by Signpost, 2015
- Pilgrim Year (Seven-volume boxset), published by Novalis, 2018

=== Videos ===
- Steve Bell — In Concert, at Home, and With Friends (1996)
- Steve Bell Band In Concert (1999)
- Steve Bell in Concert with The Edmonton Symphony Orchestra (2007, review)
- Steve Bell & Malcolm Guite — Live at the West End: An Evening of Story, Song and Friendship (2013)

=== Songbooks ===
- The Music of Steve Bell (1989–1995)
- Romantics & Mystics (1997)
- Simple Songs (2000)
- Waiting for Aidan (2001)
- Devotion (digital) (2008)

=== Audio magazines ===
- Blessings, volume 1
- Can God Be Trusted, volume 2

=== Collaborations ===
- Co-wrote "Tremble" with Glen Soderholm on his album By Faint Degrees (Pilgrim Gargoyle Recording, 2000)
- Co-wrote "These Are The Ones" with Glen Soderholm on his album This Bright Sadness (Signpost, 2008)
- "Everything We Need" (2009, video) (with Fresh I.E.)
- "Where the Good Way Lies" (2016, song) (with Fresh I.E. and Ray "Coco" Stevenson)

=== Notable appearances ===
- Mandolin and vocals on Glen Soderholm's album In the Belly of the Fish (Pilgrim Gargoyle Recording, 1997)
- Background vocals on Glen Soderholm's By Faint Degrees (Pilgrim Gargoyle Recording, 2000)
- Mandolin and guitar on "It Has to Be You", on Carolyn Arends' album Travelers (Signpost, 2001)
- Duet on "Who You Are" on Carolyn Arends' album Under the Gaze (2B Records, 2004)
- Duet on "When I Survey The Wondrous Cross" with Lianna Klassen on her album Out of Borderland (Dawntreader Productions, 2004)
- Harmony vocals on "All Is Made Well" on Glen Soderholm's World Without End (Signpost, 2006)
- Background vocals on "Tonight I Am the Wind" with Kerri Woelke on her album Where We Were (Signpost, 2008)
- Background vocals on "Never Say Goodbye" on Carolyn Arends' album Love Was Here First (Signpost, 2009)
- Harmony vocals on "Lord of All" on Jaylene Johnson's album Potter & Clay (Signpost, 2016)

=== Songs in other projects ===
- Window of Hope, "Here by the Water", "Burning Ember", "Ready My Heart" and "Psalm 32" (Gospel Music Foundation, 2002)
- Signpost Collections Vol. 1, "Ever Present Need", "Stay Awake" (Signpost, 2003)
- Sea to Sea: Filled With Your Glory, "Jesus My Glory" (CMC, 2004)
- Canadian Bible Society centennial CD: Good News Celebration, "Eventide" (CMC, 2006)
- GMA Canada presents 30th Anniversary Collection, "Deep Calls To Deep" (CMC, 2008)
- Sea to Sea: Christmas, "Coventry Carol" (Lakeside, 2009)
- Am I Safe? Exploring Fear and Anxiety with Children by Tim Huff & Iona Snair, "A Heartbeat Away" (Castle Quay Books, 2019)

== Awards and recognition ==
Note that years indicated represent award ceremony dates, not the years in which qualifying albums were released.

Gold Crown Award

- 2009 Best Music Video: Steve Bell in Concert with the Edmonton Symphony Orchestra

Gospel Music Association of Canada Covenant Awards

- 2002 Pop/Contemporary Album of the Year: Waiting for Aidan
- 2002 Song of the Year: "Eventide"
- 2008 Producers of the Year (with Dave Zeglinski): Symphony Sessions
- 2009 Jazz/Blues Song of the Year: "Embrace the Mystery"
- 2011 Folk/Roots Album of the Year (tie): Kindness
- 2015 Folk album of the Year: Pilgrimage
- 2015 Album Artwork: Roberta Hanson/designer: Pilgrimage
- 2018 Lifetime Achievement Award
- 2018 Album of the Year: Where the Good Way Lies
- 2018 Collaboration of the Year (with Ray "Coco" Stevenson and Fresh I.E.): Where the Good Way Lies
- 2018 Inspirational Song of the Year: Wait Alone in Stillness
- 30 other nominations between 2001 - 2018

Juno Awards

- 1998 Best Gospel Album: Romantics & Mystics
- 2001 Best Gospel Album: Simple Songs
- 2002 nominee, Best Gospel Album: Waiting for Aidan
- 2010 nominee, Best Contemporary Christian/Gospel Album: Devotion
- 2015 Recording Package of the Year: Pilgrimage boxset designed by Roberta Hansen
- 2017 nominee, Contemporary Christian/Gospel Album of the Year: Where the Good Way Lies

Prairie Music Awards

- 2001 Outstanding Christian Recording: Simple Songs
- 2001 Outstanding Producer (with Dave Zeglinski): Simple Songs
- 2002 Outstanding Christian Recording: Waiting For Aidan

Shai/Vibe Awards

- 2003 Male Vocalist of the Year
- 2004 Artist of the Year
- 2004 Male Soloist of the Year
- 2005 nominee, Male Soloist of the Year

Western Canadian Music Awards

- 2004 nominee, Outstanding Christian Recording (with Sarah Bell): Sons & Daughters
- 2004 nominee, Outstanding Producer (with Dave Zeglinski): Sons & Daughters
- 2008 Outstanding Contemporary Christian/Gospel Recording: Symphony Sessions
- 2009 Contemporary Christian/Gospel Recording of the Year: Devotion
- 2013 Spiritual Recording of the Year: Keening for the Dawn
- 2015 nominee, Roots Album of the Year: Pilgrimage
- 2015 Album Design: Pilgrimage (Roberta Hanson / designer)

Word Awards

- 2014 Terence L. Bingley Award for Best Song Lyrics: "Oracles"
- 2015 Terence L. Bingley Award for Best Song Lyrics: "Long Love"
- 2017 Word Award for Poetry: "Freedom Road" in Intotemak Magazine
- 2017 nominee, Column – Single: "Red Brother Red Sister" in Mosaic Magazine
- 2018 Word Award for Column – Single: "Success: The Art of Staying Closely Behind" in Seven Magazine
- 2019 nominee (awards not yet announced) for Best Song Lyrics: "Wouldn't You Love to Know"
- 2019 nominee (awards not yet announced) for Poetry: "The Name"

Other

- 1999 Cantate Award Citation (St. Benedict’s Monastery)
- 2008 Distinguished Christian Leadership Award / Providence College and Seminary
- 2012 Queen Elizabeth II Diamond Jubilee Medal
- 2013 Winnipeg Symphony Orchestra Golden Baton Award for artistic achievement
- 2017 Crandall University Leadership Award
- 2018 CMU Pax Award
- 2021 Member of the Order of Manitoba

== See also ==
- Hugh Marsh (Collaborations)
- Music of Manitoba
