= Life of Worship =

Studio album by Jon Bauer
- Released: February 2005
- Recorded: One Watt Studio, Sherwood Park, Alberta, Canada
- Genre: Praise & Worship
- Length: 43:05
- Label: Crossway Records - Indie Label
- Producer: Jeff Watt; Jon Bauer

Jon Bauer chronology
Life of Worship (2005)	Surround (2007)

Professional ratings
Review scores
Source	Rating
Cross Rhythms	4/5 stars

Life of Worship is the debut album from Jon Bauer.

== Track listing ==
1. "Your Amazing Grace" (Jon Bauer) - 3:47
2. "Pray" (Jon Bauer) - 5:00
3. "Life of Worship" (Jon Bauer) - 4:39
4. "Born for More" (Jon Bauer) - 4:24
5. "Promise (For I Know)" (Jon Bauer) - 3:54
6. "Forever Unchanging" (Jon Bauer) - 4:28
7. "Fix My Eyes" (Jon Bauer) - 4:41
8. "My Everything" (Jon Bauer) - 4:45
9. "May I Be" (Jon Bauer) - 3:47
10. "How Marvelous (My Savior's Love)" (Charles H. Gabriel, arranged by Jon Bauer) - 3:40
