= Surround (Jon Bauer album) =

Studio album by Jon Bauer
- Released: September 2007
- Recorded: One Watt Studio, Sherwood Park, Alberta, Canada
- Genre: Praise & Worship
- Length: 42:38
- Label: Crossway Records - Indie Label
- Producer: Jeff Watt; Jon Bauer

Jon Bauer chronology
Life of Worship (2005)	Surround (2007)	Giver of Grace - Kids Worship: Volume 1 (2008)

Professional ratings
Review scores
Source	Rating
Cross Rhythms	9/10 stars

Surround is the second album from Jon Bauer.

== Credits ==
Artist	Credit
Jon Bauer	Arranger, Audio Production, Composer, Guitar (Acoustic), Primary Artist, Producer, Vocal Producer, Vocals
Dave Block	Choir/Chorus
Dave Clo	Guitar (Electric), Producer, Vocal Engineer, Vocal Producer
Glenn Frekelton	Guitar (Electric), Programming
Reginald Heber	Composer
Kent Hooper	Mixing
Jeff Watt	Audio Engineer, Audio Production, Guitar (Acoustic), Guitar (Bass), Guitar (Electric), Keyboards, Mandolin, Programming
Caris Rinas	Vocals (Background)
Enoch Rottier	Drums
Dan Shike	Mastering
Michelle Swift	Vocals (Background)
Traditional	Composer
Jeff Watt	Composer

== Track listing ==
1. "Awaken" (Jon Bauer) - 3:26
2. "Call to Me" (Jon Bauer & Jeff Watt) - 4:27
3. "Surround" (Jon Bauer) - 4:09
4. "Holy Lord" (Jon Bauer) - 4:48
5. "Giver of Grace" (Jon Bauer & Jeff Watt) - 3:49
6. "A Love to Die For" (Jon Bauer & Jeff Watt) - 5:05
7. "Glorious to Me" (Jon Bauer & Jeff Watt) - 3:45
8. "You Are" (Jon Bauer) - 3:24
9. "It Was Your Love" (Jon Bauer & Glenn Freckelton) - 3:47
10. "Holy Holy Holy (You Are Holy Lord)" (John Bacchus Dykes & Reginald Heber, arranged by Jon Bauer) - 5:58
