= Riley Armstrong (musician) =

Canadian singer-songwriter (born 1976)

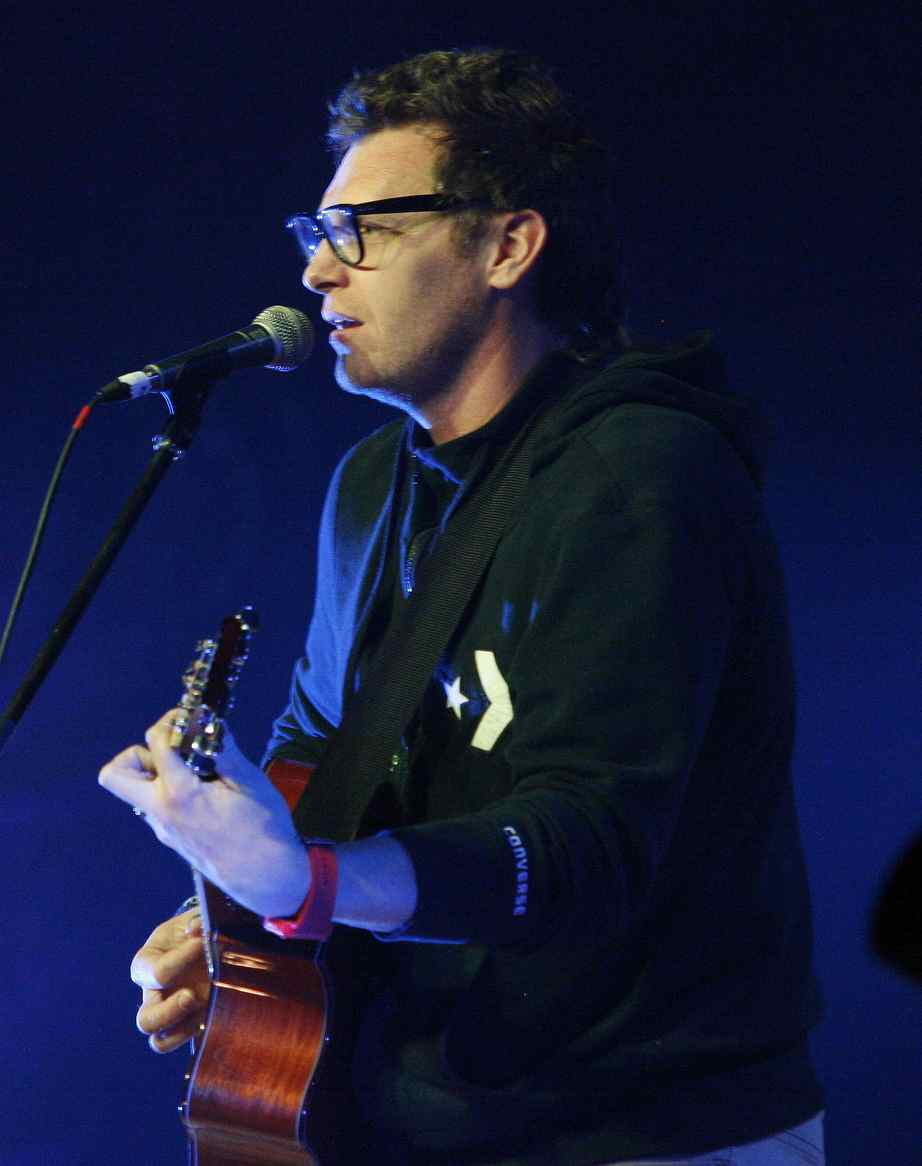
- Riley Armstrong at RUSH 2013

Background information
- Also known as: Plain Edson
- Born: May 20, 1976 (age 50); Dapp, Alberta, Canada
- Origin: Calgary, Alberta
- Genres: Contemporary Christian, folk
- Occupations: singer, songwriter, engineer, producer
- Instruments: acoustic guitar, looping device, vocals
- Years active: 1998–present
- Labels: Flicker Records, 7Spin Music, Independent
- Website: www.rileyarmstrong.com

Riley Armstrong (born May 20, 1976) is a Contemporary Christian singer-songwriter from the hamlet of Dapp, Alberta, Canada. Musically his work is eclectic, combining acoustic guitar and hip hop rhythms, with layers of sound supported by sampling and programmed loops. A few of his notable songs are "Sleep," "> (Greater Than)," "What I Found," and "The Only."

== Career ==
Armstrong moved to Vancouver at the age of 18 to pursue a career in music. He earned a degree in sound recording and soon became the sound engineer for the Christian rock band Hokus Pick. Armstrong was the engineer on the 1997 Hokus Pick album Snappy. A year later he released his own independent effort Novel Reason under the pseudonym Plain Edson.

Riley persuaded the members of Hokus Pick to let him be their opening act, as well as being their sound engineer. While in Nashville on a Hokus Pick tour he befriended the members of the Christian rock band Audio Adrenaline. Soon thereafter three members of Audio Adrenaline founded a new record company. Riley was invited to be the first performer to release on their Flicker Records label.

He then moved from Vancouver to Nashville, where he spent the next five years. Riley Armstrong became the opening act for Audio Adrenaline. During this period he released a follow-up album, Whatever the Weather. Armstrong then asked to be released from Flicker Records and returned to Canada. Marriage followed, with the couple settling in Calgary. Riley and his wife have one son, who was born in 2005. Also that year Riley released the album La Loop on the 7 Spin Music indie label. His band members were Rick Enns on bass, Dan Kim on guitar and Jared Falk on drums.

During 2010 Riley Armstrong toured in the U.S. during which time he also opened for Starfield during their "The Saving One" tour.

== Discography ==
=== Albums ===
- Novel Reason (Independent, 1998) (as Plain Edson)
- Riley Armstrong (Flicker Records, 2000, reviews)
- Whatever the Weather (Flicker Records, 2002, reviews)
- La Loop (7 Spin Music, 2005, review)
- Alive and Acoustic (2007, live concert CD/DVD)
- Comedy Songs (2010, EP)

=== Songs on compilations ===
- Sea to Sea: For Endless Days, "Above Every Name" (CMC, 2006)
- GMA Canada presents 30th Anniversary Collection, "What I've Found" (CMC, 2008)

=== Video ===
- Not From These Here Parts (2003)

== Awards and recognition ==
Shai Awards (formerly The Vibe Awards)

- 2003 nominee, Male Vocalist of the Year
- 2004 nominee, Male Vocalist of the Year

== Collaborations and other credits ==
- engineer: Snappy by Hokus Pick (1997)
- background vocals: This Much I Understand by Carolyn Arends (1999)
- producer and engineer: The Late Show by Toby Penner (2003)
