= Rhythm & News =

Canadian Christian a cappella vocal group

- Origin: Vancouver, British Columbia, Canada
- Genres: Gospel Music, A cappella
- Years active: 1988–1998
- Labels: Image 7, Word
- Past members: Doug Zimmerman; Mark Batten; Brad Strelau; Kevin Pollard; Spencer Welch; Todd Wickens

Rhythm & News was a Christian a cappella vocal group formed in the late 1980s in Vancouver, British Columbia, Canada. During the 1990s, the group gained success in Canada and parts of the United States in the gospel music industry. Their a cappella style with beatbox beats, hip hop and rap became known as "funkappella" throughout their fan base.

== History ==
Rhythm & News was started in 1988 by four high school friends in Vancouver, British Columbia, named Doug Zimmerman, Mark Batten, Brad Strelau, and Kevin Pollard. Their aspirations to be a Christian a cappella band started in Brad's basement singing along to a boom box. Soon, the guys were sporadically touring across Canada. With the release of their first album, Get With the Rhythm, Rhythm & News was introduced to the rest of Canada with their original "funkappella" style. The height of their success came in 1992, when they released their second studio album, Word 2 Y'all, which became one of the top selling albums in Canada by a Canadian gospel artist. In 1994, the group temporarily moved to Detroit, Michigan for a few months to record their third and last album, Dream Love + Pray with gospel great Fred Hammond.

Later in 1994, original members Doug and Kevin left the group and were replaced with Todd Wickens and Spencer Welch. The transition produced a departure from their a cappella beats to live instruments. The band continued to tour across North America and parts of South America until disbanding in 1998.

Through the group's Facebook page, the guys have expressed that they have had discussions of possibly reuniting to record in the studio.

In 2019, the group began rehearsing once again for fun, now with new member Clint Ironmonger. They have released singles such as "Fix You" (Coldplay) and "God Rest Ye Merry Gentlemen" onto Mark Batten's Youtube channel.

== Members ==
- Doug Zimmermann (1988–1994)
- Kevin Pollard (1988–1994)
- Mark Batten (1988–1998, 2019–2024)
- Brad Strelau (1988–1998, 2019–2024)
- Spencer Welch (1994–1998)
- Todd Wickens (1994–1998, 2019–2024)
- Clint Ironmonger (2019–2024)

== Discography ==
- Get With the Rhythm (1990)
- Word 2 Y'all (1992)
- Dream Love + Pray (1994)

=== Songs on Compilations ===
- GMA Canada Presents 30th Anniversary Collection, "Get With the Rhythm" (CMC, 2008)

== Awards ==
=== Gospel Music Association of Canada 30th Annual Covenant Awards ===
2008 Lifetime Achievement Award
