= Graham Ord =

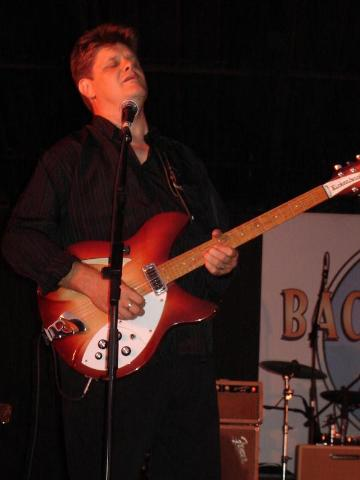

Background information
- Born: Graham Mark Ord; 22 March 1961 (age 65); Colchester, Essex, England
- Origin: London, England
- Genres: Blues, Gospel
- Instruments: Vocals, guitar
- Years active: 1989–present
- Label: Knewsense
- Website: grahamord.com

Graham Ord (born 22 March 1961) is an English musician and songwriter. He has garnered respect internationally as a fine musician and engaging communicator. Ord performed with the Wesley Brothers in the UK before embarking on his solo career.

Graham Ord was born in Colchester, Essex into a musical family and began songwriting as early as five years old. He began playing the guitar in his early teens, being taught by his father and various music teachers at night school and private lessons. During the late 1970s, while still at school in Wales, he performed in the Punk band 'Fire Exit'. In the early 1980s, he made the move to London where he lived briefly in Chelsea and later in Hatfield, eventually settling in St Albans. He became a regular as a solo act performing in the North London clubs and pubs supporting various bands and other artists. His younger brother Doug joined him later and together with Daryl C they formed the New Wave band 'Prussian Blues'. They recorded together and performed in various clubs and wine bars in the London area.

Ord's musical direction took a major turn after he found faith in Christ and for a year or so he did not perform too much in public. Later he teamed up with bass player Dave Moore and they began performing as a duo. Later they asked Graham's brother to join them on drums and formed the band 'Hearts on Fire'. This band later became known as the Wesley Brothers, Graham taking the name Leslie Wesley and Dave being known as Elvis Wesley. Other band members were inducted including Grunt, Hormone, Chipolata, Doc and Andrew Lloyd Wesley. The Wesley's ended up having 13 drummers in a twelve-year period. The Wesley Brothers performed regularly on the North London pub circuit and recorded their debut Fill Me Up which charted in 1996. Produced by Martin Smith of Delirious?, the title track also featured a duet between Graham and Kevin Prosch. Graham and Dave later also toured with Prosch's band in the UK. Shortly after the Wesley's signed with Alliance Media the band broke up and Graham went on to record a solo project entitled 'Cryin' Freedom' again with Martin Smith producing and featuring Marc James on lead guitar and Jimmy "The Skin" Cooke on drums (later with Vera Cruz). It was a rock and roll album which, despite promises of major distribution, was never widely released. In 1998, Ord's popular song "The Lord is Gracious and Compassionate" was recorded by Vineyard Music Group in the UK and Ireland, while Ord relocated to Canada and began a solo career in Vancouver B.C. His first Canadian release was an instrumental recording entitled Waiting. He then went on to record two CD's with producer and writer Brian Doerksen with the Vineyard Canada Music group.

Ord has since travelled extensively around the world as a musician and has released eight solo albums to date, together with several collaborative projects which have attracted accolades from around the world. He has also written and produced music for several other successful artists and has composed scores for short film and narratives.

His production work with Canadian First Nations Artist Cheryl Bear won three major awards in 2007 including 'Single of the year' at the Aboriginal People's Choice Awards in Canada and in the US.

His latest recording Chill, an instrumental collaboration with Andrew Smith and Brian Wiebe, was nominated for a Shai award (Canada's peoples choice music awards) for instrumental CD of the year.

Ord now works as a full-time musician and recording artist based out of Kelowna, B.C., Canada.

== Discography ==
=== Albums ===
- To Tame a Heart (1989)
- Crying Freedom (Independent, 1996, review)
- Fill Me Up (Knewsense, 1996) (with the Wesley Brothers)
- Waiting (Knewsense, 2000)
- An Offering: Honest to God Worship (Knewsense, 2001, review)
- A Good Day with the Blues (Knewsense, 2003) (with Dane Stevens)
- Regarding The Maker (Knewsense, 2005, review)
- Chill (Knewsense, 2006) (with Andrew Smith and Brian Wiebe)

=== Songs in other projects ===
- wrote "Celebrate Emmanuel" on Lianna Klassen's album: Once Upon a Time Forever After (2002)

=== Songs on compilations ===
- Sea to Sea: I See the Cross, "Going Back to the Source" (CMC, 2005)

=== Soundtracks ===
- I Am: 365 Names of God (2002, Stream Ministries)
