= Drentch =

Christian rock band

- Origin: Edmonton, Alberta, Canada
- Genres: Christian rock
- Members: Mark Steinbrenner; Graden Steinbrenner; Derek Steinbrenner; Darcy Anhorn
- Website: www.drentch.com/music-sym.php

Drentch is a Canadian Christian rock band which comes from Edmonton, Alberta, Canada. They have released two independent albums, and are currently working on their third album. They played at YC (Youth Conference) in 2005, the largest Christian youth gathering in western Canada, held annually at Rexall Place in Edmonton.

== Introduction ==
Drentch is a Canadian Christian/rock, concert and worship band that hails from Edmonton, Alberta. The group's sound is mainly alternative rock. However they are known to mix a blend of different genres in their albums, such as the aforementioned alternative rock to occasionally softer ballad style songs. The group has four main members, two brothers, their cousin, and a long-time family friend, that have been playing together for a number of years, prior to officially becoming the band known as Drentch.

== History ==
The beginnings of Drentch were already set in motion as eventual members Mark, Graden and Derek Steinbrenner and friend Darcy Anhorn typically played for the worship services at their hometown church in north Edmonton, where the Steinbrenner brothers' father is a pastor. They first officially formed the band in 2000. However, the name of the band was initially quite different, being Crimson Shadow. However this name did not last, as of November, 2000, the band started accepting suggestions for a new name. The members eventually reached a consensus on the name Drentch.

The band's fan base is strongly based on the youth and young adult audience from which they draw much of the inspiration for their music. The band remains unsigned, and yet they have already released 3 independent albums titled Everything, Symphony of Tears, and take control, produced in Nashville by Ainslie Grosser, Joel Smallbone, and Drentch themselves.

As far as musical styling, the band not only depends on driving guitar riffs but also utilizes piano, strings, full orchestra, dramatic electric guitar pickings and a variety of other instrumental styles. The lead vocal styling also ranges from more alternative rock sounds to even slower ballad style songs. All the while, the band still maintains their original mission on using music as praise and creating a contemporary ministry in the form of music to a youthful audience.

== Members ==
The four members are brothers, Mark and Graden Steinbrenner, their cousin Derek Steinbrenner and longtime family friend Darcy Anhorn.

- Mark Steinbrenner: Vocals, keys, acoustic/electric guitar
- Graden Steinbrenner:Bass
- Derek Steinbrenner: Lead guitar
- Darcy Anhorn: Drums

== Discography ==
=== Albums ===
- Everything (Independent, 2001)
- Symphony of Tears (Independent, 2005)
- Take Control (Independent, 2009)

(all albums are available via iTunes)

=== Songs on compilations ===
- Sea to Sea: I See The Cross, "Surround Me" (CMC, 2005)

=== Other songs ===
- Silent Night - O Come Let Us Adore Him

== Awards and recognition ==
GMA Canada Covenant Awards

- 2009 nominee, Rock Album Of The Year: Take Control
- 2009 nominee, Rock Song Of The Year: "Take Control"

Shai Awards (formerly The Vibe Awards)

- 2004 nominee, New Artist Of The Year
- 2004 nominee, Rock/Alternative Album Of The Year: Everything
