= Tommy Hunter =

Canadian country music performer (1937–2026)

Tommy Hunter CM OOnt
- Born: Thomas James Hunter; March 20, 1937; London, Ontario, Canada
- Died: July 2, 2026 (aged 89) London, Ontario, Canada
- Genre: Country
- Occupation: Singer
- Instruments: Vocals; guitar
- Years active: 1956–2012
- Website: www.tommyhunter.com

Thomas James Hunter CM OOnt (March 20, 1937 – July 2, 2026) was a Canadian country music performer, known as "Canada's Country Gentleman".

== Career ==
In 1956, he began performing as a rhythm guitarist on the CBC Television show Country Hoedown. The Tommy Hunter Show began as a CBC Radio program in 1960, replacing the long-running variety show The Happy Gang, and went on to replace Country Hoedown on CBC Television in 1965; Hunter's show was picked up by TNN in 1983 and ran on CBC until 1992. Performers on the show included singer-songwriter Gordon Lightfoot in the early years of his own musical career.

People who performed on The Tommy Hunter Show early in their careers include:

- Garth Brooks
- Shania Twain, then known as Eileen Twain
- The Judds
- Yvonne Murray

After his show was cancelled by the CBC, Hunter continued to tour with his band, The Travelling Men. He retired after his final tour in 2012.

== Death ==
Hunter died at a retirement home in London, Ontario, on July 2, 2026, at the age of 89. Family members and his rescue dog were at his bedside.

== Awards and recognition ==
Hunter was inducted into the Canadian Country Music Hall of Fame in 1984. In 1986, Hunter was made a Member of the Order of Canada. He received three Canadian Juno Awards and one Gemini Award. In 1990, he was given a place in the Country Music Hall of Fame's "Walkway of Stars". A street ("Tommy Hunter Way") was also renamed in his honour in his hometown of London, Ontario, in the late 1990s. He became a member of the Order of Ontario in 1996. In 2005 he was honoured with a GMA Canada Lifetime Achievement Award. The award is handed out annually by the Gospel Music Association of Canada.

He received the Queen Elizabeth II Golden Jubilee Medal in 2002 and the Queen Elizabeth II Diamond Jubilee Medal in 2012.

== Discography ==
=== Albums ===
Year	Album
1964	Tommy Hunter
1968	Travelling with Tommy Hunter
1970	Tommy Hunter
1971	Time Slips Away
1973	Tommy Hunter's Greatest Hits
1975	Tommy
1982	Tommy
1983	Gospel Readings and Recitations
1989	The Anniversary Sessions
1993	Tommy Hunter Sings for You
1995	Timeless Country Treasures
1996	Timeless Country Treasures Vol. 2

=== Singles ===
Year	Single	Peak chart positions			Album
Year	Single	CAN Country	CAN AC	US Country	Album
1967	"Cup of Disgrace"	2	—	—	Travelling with Tommy Hunter
1967	"The Battle of the Little Bighorn"	2	—	—	Travelling with Tommy Hunter
1967	"Mary in the Morning"	1	—	66	Travelling with Tommy Hunter
1968	"Half a World Away"	2	—	—	Travelling with Tommy Hunter
1968	"I Can't Find a Space (To Park My Car)"	13	—	—	Travelling with Tommy Hunter
1969	"Walk With Your Neighbour"	4	—	—	Tommy Hunter (1970)
1970	"Wait for Sunday"	3	—	—	Tommy Hunter (1970)
1971	"Bill Jones General Store"	4	15	—	Time Slips Away
1974	"The Departure"	33	—	—	Tommy (1975)
1974	"Born to Be a Gypsy"	6	—	—	Tommy (1975)
1975	"Love of a Good Woman"	32	—	—	Tommy (1975)
1978	"The Great Mail Robbery"	33	28	—	—N/a
1982	"Dance With Me Molly"	38	—	—	Tommy (1982)
1982	"Fool Enough to Fall in Love Again"	34	—	—	Tommy (1982)
1989	"The Man of '87"	49	—	—	The Anniversary Sessions
1990	"Couldn't See the Gold" (with Janie Fricke)	19	—	—	The Anniversary Sessions
1990	"Name the Place and Time"	64	—	—	The Anniversary Sessions
"—" denotes releases that did not chart
