= Sea to Sea: Filled with Your Glory =

Sea to Sea: Filled With Your Glory

Compilation album by various artists
- Released: 12 October 2004
- Genre: CCM, Gospel
- Label: Lakeside Media Group / CMC Distribution

Various artists chronology
Sea to Sea: Filled With Your Glory (2004)	Sea to Sea: I See The Cross (2005)

Sea to Sea: Filled With Your Glory is the first release in the annual Sea to Sea praise and worship music series. The album comprises thirty Christian worship songs on two CDs performed by Canadian artists. It won a Gospel Music Association Canada Covenant Award in 2005 for Special Events/Compilation Album of the Year. The Sea to Sea series was the brainchild of Executive Producer Martin Smith.

== Track listing ==
=== Disc 1 ===
1. The Cry - bevAcqua
2. Every Move I Make - David Ruis
3. God Is An Awesome God - Pat Francis & High Praise
4. Jesus My Glory - Steve Bell
5. Amazing - Curtis Mulder
6. He Is Yahweh - Dean Salyn
7. God Is Our Refuge - Northview Community Church
8. Renew In Me - Aileen Lombardo
9. Ocean - Ten Shekel Shirt
10. Great "I Am" - Laurell Hubick
11. Today - Brian Doerksen
12. What A Faithful God - Robert Critchley
13. Fall On Me - Ron Wilding
14. Thank You - Greg Sczebel
15. If My People - The Penny Merchants
16. Sing, Shout, Clap - Billy Funk
17. Dieu Est Un Refuge - Northview Community Church

=== Disc 2 ===
1. Filled With Your Glory - Starfield
2. Show Me Your Mercy - Craig Douglas Band
3. Sing Hallelujah - Mark Stokes
4. Come And Fill Me Up - The Revolution Band
5. Worthy - Fergus Marsh
6. All You Are - Dan Wilt
7. Right Now - Tehillah Toronto
8. Holy One - Three Season Ant
9. Sing To The Lord - Q-Town
10. Lord Of Everything - Jon Buller
11. People On Our Knees - Ken And Tracy Rahn
12. Instrument Of Praise - Toronto Mass Choir
13. You Are All I Need - Sean Dayton
14. How Is It - Chris Janzen
15. The Peace Of Christ - Glen Soderholm
