= Jon Bauer =

Background information
- Born: Jonathan Bauer; March 1, 1977 (age 49)
- Genres: Praise & Worship
- Occupation: Worship Artist
- Years active: 2004 - present
- Label: Crossway Records - Indie Label
- Website: www.jonbauermusic.com

Jon Bauer (born March 1, 1977) is a Canadian contemporary Christian music (CCM) artist, worship leader, and songwriter from St. Albert, Alberta, Canada. Bauer leads worship, speaks, and performs over 100 concerts around the world each year. Some of his most well-known songs are "Come and Save Us", "Chasing After Me", "Forevermore", "Awaken", "Giver of Grace", "Your Amazing Grace", "Life of Worship", and "Pray". While Jon is a full-time touring artist, he is also an Artist in Residence at his home church of St. Albert Alliance where he returns one weekend each month to lead worship.

== Musical career ==
Bauer is a Worship Artist who tours full-time throughout the world performing at concerts, churches and schools each week. His songs are sung in churches throughout the world each weekend as well as in school classrooms. Bauer has six albums to his credit. The newest album "Roots of Worship" is a folk-worship sounding album including many of the top 10 songs sung in churches throughout the world. Bauer's previous album Forevemore was awarded "2012 Praise and Worship Album of the Year" by the GMA Canada Covenant Awards. It was also nominated by the 2012 Juno Awards for "Contemporary Christian Album of the Year".

Past TV coverage includes Trinity Broadcasting Network (TBN), The Harvest Show, Daystar Television Network, 100 Huntley Street, The Miracle Channel, Living Truth and the TCT Network.

Bauer's worship singles "Awaken" and "Come and Save Us" have been included on the compilation albums for Hosanna Integrity’s Maximum Worship. "Awaken" also appeared in the March 2008 Worship Leader Magazine Song Discovery Disc, and "Forevermore" appeared in the July 2010 Worship Leader Magazine Song Discovery Disc, distributed to over 35,000 worship leaders.

== Discography ==
=== Studio albums ===
- Life of Worship (2005)
- Surround (2007)
- Giver of Grace - Kids Worship: Volume 1 (2008)
- Light of Another World (EP) (2009)
- Forevermore (2011) (Canadian Release)
- Come and Save Us - Kids Worship: Volume 2 (2011)
- Forevermore (2012) (US Release)
- Roots of Worship (2013)
- The Light in Us (2016)

=== Songs on Compilations ===
- Merge (Lakeside, 2005)
- Sea to Sea: I See The Cross, "Life of Worship" (CMC, 2005)
- Sea to Sea: For Endless Days, "Your Amazing Grace" (CMC, 2006)
- Sea to Sea: The Voice of Creation, "Awaken" (CMC, 2007)
- Maximum Worship Blue - Canada's Top 25 Worship Songs, "Awaken" (Hosanna, 2007)

== Awards and recognition ==
GMA Canada Covenant Awards

- 2005 nominee, Praise And Worship Album Of The Year: Life of Worship
- 2005 nominee, Male Vocalist Of The Year
- 2006 nominee, Song Of The Year: "Promise"
- 2006 Compilation Album Of The Year: Sea to Sea - I See the Cross, "Life of Worship"
- 2007 nominee, Worship Song Of The Year: "Life of Worship"
- 2008 Male Vocalist Of The Year
- 2009 Children's Album Of The Year: Giver Of Grace
- 2009 nominee, Modern Worship Song Of The Year: "Surround"
- 2010 nominee, "Praise and Worship Song of the Year" for his song "Forevermore". He also received a second nomination for "Seasonal Song of the Year" for his Christmas song "Silent Night – Our Savior is Born"
- 2011 Children's Song Of The Year: "Giver Of Grace"
- 2011 nominee, "Male Vocalist of the Year", "Song of the Year", "Worship Song of the Year", and "Classical/Traditional Song of the Year"
- 2012 Praise and Worship Album Of The Year: "Forevermore"
- 2012 Children's Song of the Year: "Chasing After Me"
- 2012 nominee - Most nominated artist with the following nominations: Artist of the Year, Male Vocalist of the Year, Praise and Worship Album of the Year (Forevermore), Praise and Worship Song of the Year ("Come and Save Us"), Song of the Year ("Come and Save Us"), Pop/Contemporary Song of the Year ("Chasing After Me"), Instrumental Song of the Year ("Forevermore"), Children’s Album of the Year (Come and Save Us), Children’s Song of the Year ("Chasing After Me"), and Classical/Traditional Song of the Year ("How Marvelous")
- 2016 Inspirational Song of the Year - Where the Sidwalk Ends
- 2016 Pop Song of the Year - Say Something (nominee)
- 2016 Praise and Worship Album of the Year - Light in Us (nominee)
- 2016 Recorded Song of the Year - Starts With Us(nominee)
- 2016 Male Vocalist of the Year (nominee)
- 2016 Artist of the Year (nominee)
- 2016 Album of the Year (nominee)

Juno Awards

- 2012 nominee, Best Contemporary Christian/Gospel Album: Forevermore

Maja Awards

- 2006 seven nominations
- 2008 Male Artist Of The Year

Shai Awards

- 2007 New Artist Of The Year
- 2007 nominee, Male Soloist Of The Year
- 2007 nominee, Pop/Contemporary Album Of The Year: Life of Worship

Western Canadian Music Awards

- 2008 nominee, Outstanding Contemporary Christian/Gospel Recording: Surround
- 2012 nominee, Outstanding Contemporary Christian/Gospel Recording: Forevermore

Independent Music Awards

- 2009 "Surround" nominated for the 8th Annual Independent Music Awards for Contemporary Christian Album.
- 2012 "Forevermore" awarded Independent Music Awards the Contemporary Christian Album of the Year.

== See also ==
- Contemporary Christian music
