= Glen Soderholm =

- Born: December 5, 1959 (age 66); Toronto, Ontario, Canada
- Origin: Guelph, Ontario, Canada
- Genres: acoustic, Folk
- Occupations: singer, songwriter, teacher/facilitator
- Instruments: guitar, vocals
- Label: Moveable Feast Resources
- Website: www.glensoderholm.com

Glen Soderholm is a Canadian, singer-songwriter, minister, praise and worship leader, speaker and teacher based in Guelph, Ontario, Canada.

== Musical career ==
Glen Soderholm is an ordained Presbyterian minister who has five albums to his credit. His music is insightful spiritual acoustic folk, which often highlights Trinitarian themes.

He took up the guitar at 13 years of age, playing with the Jesus People at his church and at coffee-houses in the early seventies in Montreal. Soderholm graduated from the University of Toronto in 1981, with a BA degree in History and English. He subsequently worked with the Youth for Christ high school campus ministry for some six years. He continued his studies at Knox College and was awarded the Master of Divinity degree. He was ordained a minister of the Presbyterian Church in Canada in 1991.

Between 1991 and 2004 Soderholm pastored two parishes in the town of Milton, Ontario, St. David's in the village of Campbellville, and Nassagaweya. During this time he recorded several of his albums. His debut, In The Belly Of the Fish, was released in 1997 on his own Pilgrim Gargoyle Recordings label. Glen Soderholm presently records on the Moveable Feast label, distributed via Signpost Distribution.

In June 2004 Soderholm founded Moveable Feast Resources, of which he is the full-time director. This is an innovative ministry consulting ministry based in Guelph, with performing and teaching, singing, songwriting, worship leadership and guidance. The ministry aims to tune up worship services in churches and is done within all the different church traditions. He still occasionally performs live. Since 2012, he has pastored a church plant called Two Rivers Church in downtown Guelph, Ontario.

Glen Soderholm is the father of Danielle and Julia, and husband of Sharon Soderholm.

== Discography ==
In The Belly Of the Fish (review)

- Released: 1997
- Format: CD/MP3
- Label: Pilgrim Gargoyle Recordings
- Producer: Glen Soderholm and Bruce Stacey

By Faint Degrees

- Released: 2000
- Format: CD/MP3
- Label: Pilgrim Gargoyle Recordings
- Producer: Roy Salmond

Rest

- Released: 2003
- Format: CD/MP3
- Label: Signpost Music
- Producer: Roy Salmond

World Without End (reviews)

- Released: 2006
- Format: CD/MP3
- Label: Moveable Feast / Signpost Distribution
- Producer: Roy Salmond

This Bright Sadness (review)

- Released: 2008
- Format: CD/MP3
- Label: Moveable Feast / Signpost Distribution
- Producer: Roy Salmond

Do Not Be Afraid

- Released: November 5, 2010
- Format: CD/MP3

=== Collaborations ===
- co-wrote "Tremble" with Steve Bell on By Faint Degrees (2000)
- co-wrote "Never Give Up On You" and "Magnolia" on Jacob Moon's album Eventide (2005)
- co-wrote the lyrics for "I Will Gather You" with Jacob Moon on Soderholm's album World Without End (2006)
- co-wrote "This Christmas" with Jacob Moon on Moon's album This Christmas (2007)
- co-wrote "These are the Ones" with Steve Bell on This Bright Sadness (2008)

=== Notable appearances ===
- backing vocals on "Everybody Wants Everything", on Carolyn Arends' Pollyanna's Attic (Signpost, 2006)
- vocals (choir) on "Just Like You", on Jacob Moon's album The Loop (Signpost, 2007)
- vocals on "This Christmas", on Jacob Moon's This Christmas (Signpost, 2007)

=== Songs in other projects ===
- Steve Bell, Waiting for Aidan, music and lyrics: "Psalm 121" (Signpost, 2001)
- Signpost Collections Vol. 1, "What Can We Do For You" (Signpost, 2003)
- Sea to Sea: Filled With Your Glory, "The Peace Of Christ" (CMC, 2004)

== Awards and recognition ==
GMA Canada Covenant Awards

- 2005 Compilation Album of the Year: Sea to Sea: Filled With Your Glory, "The Peace Of Christ"
- 2008 nominee, Seasonal Song Of The Year: "This Christmas" (co-written with Jacob Moon)
- 2009 nominee, Folk/Roots Album Of The Year: This Bright Sadness
- 2009 nominee, Folk/Roots Song Of The Year: "Mercy Seat"

== See also ==
- Contemporary Christian Music
- Signpost Music
