= Kerri Woelke =

- Born: August 15, 1977 (age 48); Winnipeg, Manitoba, Canada
- Origin: Winnipeg, Manitoba, Canada
- Genres: Folk, Roots, Alt-Country
- Occupations: Performer, songwriter
- Instruments: Guitar, vocals
- Years active: 2003–present
- Label: Signpost Music
- Website: www.kerriwoelke.com

Kerri Woelke (born August 15, 1977) is a Folk/Roots/Alt-Country singer-songwriter from Winnipeg, Manitoba, Canada. She is currently represented by Signpost Music.

== Biography ==
Manitoba born, the child of fun-loving 60's musician mother and a poetic (but tone deaf) father, Kerri showed her artistic promise early. Her parents gave her a karaoke machine during her elementary school years, and by the time she emerged from her room for her high school graduation, she was ready to begin sharing her music with the public. At her parents' insistence ("You need to learn to back yourself up!"), and to her roommate's distress, Kerri taught herself to play guitar while attending college. Relegated to the tiny dorm bathroom to practice, she emerged from this experience determined to offer her growing repertoire of originals with a wider audience. The next years were spent honing her craft with the bands Dirty Old Hank and Gretchen, playing at Manitoba festivals and on the CBC. In 2005, Kerri switched to a solo singer–songwriter format, won the Manitoba Christian Talent Search, and recorded her first solo album (self-titled – released February 2007). That project received 2 Covenant Award nominations, Folk/Roots Album of the Year, and CD Design of the Year (designed by Cyndi Koshowski) as well as a Western Canadian Music Award (WCMA) for Outstanding Christian Recording. Kerri is presently an Artist in Development with Canadian indie label Signpost Music. She continues touring across Canada, and has completed her second album Where We Were which was released in September 2008.

== Discography ==
Kerri Woelke

- Released: 2007
- Label: Avante Records
- Producer: Jordan Jackiew and Brian James
- Tracks: Long Way Home, D-Train, What Would You Do, If I Give You Time, Please Believe (The Diary), Real, Stand Still, Falling Down, Liars & Spiders, Rain Down, Lament

Where We Were (Executive Producers Steve Bell and Dave Zeglinski)

- Released: 2008
- Label: Signpost Music
- Producer: Jordan Jackiew and Brian James
- Tracks: Last Dance, Sweep, On My Way (To You), Take A Chance, Other Side, The Mom Song, BC, By The Mark, Find Me Here, If I Give My Soul, What Would It Take, Lame On Me, Tonight I Am The Wind, Last Dance (Reprise)

== Awards and recognition ==
=== Gospel Music Association of Canada Covenant Awards ===
- 2007 nominee, Folk/Roots Album of the Year: Kerri Woelke
- 2007 nominee, CD/DVD Artwork Design of the Year: Kerri Woelke (designed by Cyndi Koshowski)

=== Western Canadian Music Awards ===
- 2007 nominee, Outstanding Christian Recording: Kerri Woelke

== See also ==
- Music of Manitoba
