= Tara Dettman =

- Origin: Clifford, Ontario, Canada
- Genres: Contemporary Christian
- Years active: 2004–present

Tara Dettman is a Canadian Christian music artist and songwriter from Clifford, Ontario, currently residing in South Africa. Her debut album, Overtaken was released in 2004.

== Biography and career ==
She spent three years doing an internship program at Hillsong, Australia, where she released her album, as well as concentrated on furthering her relationship with Jesus Christ. Her songs have been featured on several compilations.

Overtaken was recorded in Australia and the song "King Of My Heart" was nominated in 2006 for a GMA Canada Covenant Award for Song of the Year and Recorded Song Of The Year. She was also nominated for a GMA Canada Covenant Award in 2007 for Instrumental Song of the Year, for a rendition of "King of My Heart" performed by Glen Teeple and Jeff Teed. She was nominated in 2008 for Recorded Song Of The Year and Seasonal Song Of The Year at the 30th Annual GMA Canada Covenant Awards for the song "She Lay Down (Her Only Child)" co-written by Glen Teeple, Martin Smith and Jeff Teed.

== Discography ==
=== Albums ===
- Overtaken (Hillsong, 2004)

=== Songs on compilations ===
- Sea to Sea: I See The Cross, "King Of My Heart" (CMC, 2005)
- Maximum Worship - Canada's Top 25 Worship Songs, "King Of My Heart" (Hosanna, 2006)
- Merge (Blue), "Overtaken" (Lakeside, 2006)
- Sea to Sea: For Endless Days, "Glimpse Of You" (CMC, 2006)
- Girls Night Out Worship, "You Shine" (World Vision, 2007)
- 28th Annual Covenant Hits, "King Of My Heart" (CMC, 2007)
- GMA Canada presents 30th Anniversary Collection, "The Voice Of Creation" (CMC, 2008) (with Deanna Chapman and Monica Joy)
- Maximum Worship Christmas, "She Lay Down (Her Only Child)" (Hosanna, 2008) (with Brett Fliesser)
- Sea to Sea: Christmas, "She Lay Down (Her Only Child)" (Lakeside, 2009)

== Awards ==
GMA Canada Covenant Awards

- 2006 nominee, Song Of The Year: "King Of My Heart"
- 2006 nominee, Recorded Song Of The Year: "King Of My Heart"
- 2007 nominee, Instrumental Song Of The Year: "King Of My Heart" (performed by Glen Teeple and Jeff Teed)
- 2008 nominee, Recorded Song Of The Year: "She Lay Down (Her Only Child)" (with Brett Fliesser)
- 2008 nominee, Seasonal Song Of The Year: "She Lay Down (Her Only Child)" (with Brett Fliesser)
