= Sea to Sea: I See the Cross =

Compilation album by various artists
- Released: 18 October 2005
- Genre: CCM, Gospel
- Label: Lakeside Media Group / CMC Distribution
- Producer: Various; Executive producer: Martin Smith

Various artists chronology
Sea to Sea: Filled With Your Glory (2004)	Sea to Sea: I See the Cross (2005)	Sea to Sea: For Endless Days (2006)

Sea to Sea: I See the Cross is the second album in the annual Sea to Sea praise and worship music series. The album includes thirty songs performed by Canadian Christian artists on two CDs. The album won a Gospel Music Association Canada Covenant Award in 2006 for Special Events/Compilation Album of the Year. The Sea to Sea series is the brainchild of Covenant Award winning Executive Producer Martin Smith.

== Track listing ==
=== Disc 1 ===
1. Lift Me Higher - Shezza
2. Do You Hear the Sound? - Elias Dummer
3. Thank You for Your Love - Meeting House
4. King of My Heart - Tara Dettman
5. Open Sky - Dan Macaulay
6. Glimmer - Elevate
7. Merciful - Curtis Mulder
8. Lord We Come to You - Margaret Graham
9. Alive in This Moment - Starfield
10. Shelter - Sean Dayton
11. Surround Me - Drentch
12. Rest in His Promise - David Ruis
13. Walk into Heaven - North Park Community Church
14. You - Stephanie Mainville
15. If Anything Is Excellent - Jaylene Johnson

=== Disc 2 ===
1. I See the Cross - Brian Doerksen
2. Evidence - Chanda Cooper
3. Life of Worship - Jon Bauer
4. There Is a Redeemer - Heather Clark / Martin Jones
5. Home - Matt Brouwer
6. Holy Is Your Name - The Kry
7. Lord of the Starfields - Ali Matthews
8. Holy Holy Holy Is the Lord - Tim Van Brummelon / Willow Park Church
9. You Are God and You Are Wonderful - Lianna Klassen
10. Going Back to the Source - Graham Ord
11. Not My Own - Lowana Wallace
12. J'espere en toi - Tabitha Lemaire
13. You Heard My Cry - Jane Erickson
14. You Are - Joe Di Francesco
15. We Receive Your Blessing - Grace & Natasha Moes
