= GMA Canada Lifetime Achievement Award =

The GMA Canada Lifetime Achievement Award is handed out annually by GMA Canada (the Gospel Music Association of Canada). This annual award recognizes the achievements of artists and industry experts who have made the greatest contribution to further the Canadian Christian music scene. It is presented during GMA Canada Week, during which the annual Covenant Awards are handed out. Past winners have included Connie Scott (2006), Tommy Hunter (2005) and George Beverly Shea (2004).

The Lifetime Achievement Award has been given to both artists and industry leaders (Gerry Scott/Arlen Salte). In 2011 GMA Canada honored hard rock trail blazers Daniel Band.

In 2012, GMA Canada honoured the Toronto Mass Choir at ceremonies held November 7 in Burlington, Ontario.

== Winners ==
- Previous: The Torchmen Quartet, The Goodberry Sisters, Janet Sonnenberg, The Pavey's
- 2004 George Beverly Shea
- 2005 Tommy Hunter
- 2006 Connie Scott
- 2007 Hokus Pick
- 2008 Rhythm & News
- 2009 Gerry Scott
- 2010 Arlen Salte
- 2011 Daniel Band
- 2012 Toronto Mass Choir
- 2013 Industry - Lando Klassen
- 2013 Artist - Servant (band)
- 2014 Brian Doerksen
- 2015 Roy Salmond
- 2017 Industry - Martin Smith
- 2017 Artist - Chris Janz
- 2018 Industry - Dave Zeglimski
- 2018 Artist - Steve Bell

2004 - George Beverly Shea. GMA Canada recognized the efforts of George Beverly Shea who was born in Winchester, Ontario February 1, 1909. His long association with the Billy Graham Crusades and his more than 70 albums led to his being referred to as "America's Beloved Gospel Singer". According to the Guinness Book of Records Shea holds the world record for singing in person to the most people ever, with an estimated cumulative live audience of 220 million people. In 1932 Shea composed the tune to "I'd Rather Have Jesus," with words written by Rhea F. Miller (1894–1966). Shea was unable to attend the GMA Canada Covenant Awards ceremony in person, but sent his thanks via video link.

2005 - Tommy Hunter was recognized by GMA Canada in 2005. Hunter was born in London, Ontario, March 20, 1937. "The Tommy Hunter Show" began as a CBC radio program in 1960 and went on to replace Country Hoedown on CBC television in 1965; Hunter's show was picked up by TNN in 1983 and ran on CBC Television until 1992. One of the regular features of the program included Hunter's inspirational and Gospel songs at the close of each show. He also released two Gospel albums "Songs Of Inspiration" and "Readings" which featured the fan favourites "Touch Of The Master's Hand" and "No Charge". Tommy Hunter was inducted into the Canadian Country Music Hall of Fame in 1984. In 1986, Hunter was made a Member of the Order of Canada. He has received three Canadian Juno Awards and one Gemini Award. In 1990, he was given a place in the Country Music Hall of Fame's "Walkway of Stars". A street ("Tommy Hunter Way") was also renamed in his honour in his hometown of London, Ontario, in the late 1990s. He became a member of the Order of Ontario in 1996

2006 - Connie Scott was recognized by GMA Canada in 2006. Scott grew up around Gospel Music. Her father, Gerry Scott was both an early radio show host playing Gospel Music and the owner of Canada's largest distributor of Christian Music at the time, Word Records Canada. Connie Scott first recorded with her sister but was later signed to Sparrow Records, where she released her debut album "Heartbeat" in 1983. She followed her initial success with a string of albums through the 1980s and into the 1990s including "Spirit Mover", "Hold On" and "Forever Young". She was one of the first Contemporary Christian artists of the era to record a concept music video and toured with many of the successful artists of the era including Steve Camp, David Meece and Roby Duke.
