= Dan Macaulay =

Daniel Raymond Macaulay
- Born: Brantford, Ontario, Canada
- Occupations: speaker, singer, songwriter, worship leader author, podcaster
- Website: danmacaulay.com marriedup.net

Dan Macaulay is a Contemporary Christian music recording artist, contemporary worship leader/teacher and marriage speaker from Brantford, Ontario, Canada. He now resides in Nashville,Tennessee. Some of his most well-known songs are: "Amazing", "Hope Is Here (Joy To The World)", "Win With Love", "Morning By Morning" and "Christmas Party"

== Marriage Ministry ==
In 2018 Dan and his wife, Danielle Macualay, joined the newly formed Canadian marriage TV show A Better Us along with Ron and Ann Mainse and Mike "Pinball" and Diane Clemons. This launched them in marriage ministry. In 2021 Dan and Danielle launched their own marriage ministry endeavor called Married Up, including a Marriage Podcast and live marriage events which they lead regularly all over North America. In February 2024 Dan and Danielle released their first co-authored marriage book called "The Triangle Effect"

== Musical career ==
Macaulay released his debut album Captured Again as an independent artist in 2004. The album won two 2007 Shai Awards (formerly Vibe Awards), Worship Album of the Year and Male Soloist of the Year.

The song "Open Sky" from Captured Again was selected to be on the Canadian Christian Worship compilation Sea to Sea: I See the Cross which won a GMA Canada Covenant Award in 2006 for Special Events/Compilation Album of the Year.

He released a 4-track EP in 2009 called The Listening EP produced by Nathan Nockels (formerly of Watermark). The EP received two 2009 GMA Canada Covenant Award nominations (Canada's equivalent to the U.S. GMA Dove Award), Pop Contemporary Song of the Year for "Listening", and Worship Song of the Year for "Amazing". These songs were then included on the full-length album called "From You For You" released in April 2012.

Macaulay's song "Win With Love" from The Listening EP was chosen by Worship Leader magazine's Song Discovery program and was featured in their March and April 2009 issue.

Also, "Live Like You're Free" from the full-length album "From You For You" was chosen by Worship Leader magazine's Song Discovery program to be featured in their May 2012 issue.

Macaulay was a finalist in the 2011 session II John Lennon Songwriting Contest in the Gospel song category for his song "In Awe" found on the album '"From You For You"'

Macaulay worked with Michael W. Smith on a cover of Michaels song "Breathe in Me" from Michael's 1995 album I'll Lead You Home. Michael played keyboard on the recording and produced the track along with Bryan Lenox. This recording was included on Macaulay's April 3, 2012 full-length worship release "From You For You".

Macaulay received four 2012 Canadian Gospel Music Award Nominations (Canada's equivalent to the U.S. GMA Dove Award), including: "2012 Praise & Worship Album of The Year" (From You For You); "2012 Praise & Worship Song of The Year" (In Awe); "2012 Modern Worship Song of The Year" (From You For You); "2012 Seasonal Song of The Year" (Hope Is Here).

Original Christmas song "Hope Is Here (Joy to the World)", released by Macaulay in November 2011 was listed by Praise Charts.com at No. 9 on their list of the "Top 100 Christmas Worship Songs"

== Discography ==
=== Albums ===
From You For You Worship Leader Magazine March 2012 Review )

- Released April 2012
- Tracks:
1. From You For You
2. Be Our Love
3. Your Kindness
4. In Awe
5. Permanent
6. Listening
7. Breathe In Me
8. Win With Love
9. Amazing
10. Saving Grace (Come Thou Fount)
11. Live Like You're Free

Hope Is Here (Joy To The World) – Single

- Released November 2011
- Tracks:
1. Hope Is Here (Joy To The World)
2. In Awe (new album preview)

The Listening EP (reviews)

- Released 2009
- Tracks: "Win With Love", "Listening", "Amazing", "Listening Radio Edit"

Captured Again (review)

- Released 2004
- Tracks:
1. You Make Me
2. Open Sky
3. Amazing
4. Presence Interlude
5. In The Presence
6. Your Love
7. Wonderful Maker / So Much
8. In Me Interlude
9. Today
10. Captured Again
11. Holy
12. Amazing Interlude
13. Our Offering
