= Sea to Sea: For Endless Days =

Compilation album by various artists
- Released: 10 October 2006
- Genre: CCM, Gospel
- Label: Lakeside Media Group / CMC Distribution
- Producer: Various; Executive Producer: Martin Smith

Various artists chronology
Sea to Sea: I See The Cross (2005)	Sea to Sea: For Endless Days (2006)	Sea to Sea: The Voice of Creation (2007)

Sea to Sea: For Endless Days is the third album in the Sea to Sea Christian praise and worship music series. The album has thirty songs and two bonus tracks performed by various Canadian artists on two CDs. It won a Gospel Music Association Canada Covenant Award in 2007 for Special Events/Compilation Album of the Year. The song "For Endless Days", written for this album, garnered a 2007 Covenant Award nomination for Praise And Worship Song Of The Year.

== Track listing ==
=== Disc 1 ===
1. "Show Us Your Glory" - Jody Cross
2. "Son Of God" - Starfield
3. "Above Every Name" - Riley Armstrong
4. "Your Amazing Grace" (Sea To Sea Mix) - Jon Bauer
5. "Glimpse Of You" - Tara Dettman
6. "I've Found Love" - Adam Farrell
7. "More Than Amazing" - Jachin Mullen
8. "Summer Rain" - Andréanne Lafleur
9. "Like Rain" - Thursday Waiting
10. "Lift Voice: Lift Soul" - Corey Doak
11. "Let It Be" - Dave Hensman
12. "When You Shepherd Me" - Brian Doerksen
13. "All I'm Living For" - Matt Tapley
14. "Perfect Picture" - Lamont Hiebert
15. "Come, Now Is The Time To Worship" - Hiram Joseph
16. "My Jesus I Love Thee" - Sean and Aimee Dayton

=== Disc 2 ===
1. "For Endless Days" - Various (Songwriters: Glen Teeple, Martin Smith and Jeff Teed)
2. "God Is Our Hope" - Toronto Mass Choir
3. "Mystery" - Elevate / Briercrest College
4. "Great Is Your Name" - Sebastian Demrey
5. "Glory" - Cindy Morgan
6. "Who Will Open" - David Johnston
7. "Song Of Praise" - Paul Turner
8. "Speak To Me" - Encounter
9. "Majesty" - Victory Christian Centre
10. "Hakuna" - Krystaal
11. "Freedom Reigns" - Michael Larson
12. "Poetry In Motion" - Jeff Somers Band
13. "Holy Place" - Meghan Pierce
14. "My Troubled Soul" - Robert Critchley
15. "Amazed" - Kelly Draper
16. "Pluie D'été" - Andréanne Lafleur
