= Simple Songs (Steve Bell album) =

Studio album by Steve Bell
- Released: 2000
- Recorded: Signpost Studios, Winnipeg, Manitoba, Canada, et al
- Genre: Contemporary Christian music
- Length: 47:28
- Label: Signpost Music
- Producers: Steve Bell and Dave Zeglinski

Steve Bell chronology
Steve Bell Band Live in Concert (1999)	Simple Songs (2000)	Waiting for Aidan (2001)

Professional ratings
Review scores
Source	Rating
CCM Magazine	(favourable)

Simple Songs is the eighth album by Steve Bell. The album won the Juno Award for Best Gospel Album of the Year at the Juno Awards of 2001.

Simple Songs also won the award for Outstanding Christian Recording at the 2001 Prairie Music Awards. Steve Bell and Dave Zeglinski shared the Outstanding Producer award for the album.

== Personnel ==
- Steve Bell - guitar, mandolin, vocals
- Sarah Bell - lead vocal on "Unto the Least of These"
- Jesse Bell - second guitar on "We Come"

== Related ==
Song Book, Simple Songs (2000)

== Track listing ==
1. "God Our Protector" - 3:10
2. "Home" - 3:47 (Joseph Brauen)
3. "High Above the Fray" - 4:13
4. "Fox Glove" - 2:24 (Bruce Cockburn)
5. "All the Diamonds" - 2:36 (Bruce Cockburn)
6. "Down the Way" - 2:14
7. "Done Made My Vow to the Lord" - 3:30 (anon.)
8. "What Kind of Love is This" - 2:36 (Bryn & Sally Hayworth)
9. "Unto The Least of These" - 4:35 (Mary-Kathryn)
10. "Fresh and Green" - 2:33
11. "Peace Prayer" - 3:23 (John Foley)
12. "Come Thou Long Expected Jesus / Be Thou My Vision / Great Is Thy Faithfulness" - 5:28 (Rowland Pritchard, anon., and William M. Runyan)
13. "We Come" - 3:09 (David Adam and Jim Croegaert)
14. "For the Journey" - 3:00

Words and music by Steve Bell except where noted.
