= Romantics & Mystics =

Studio album by Steve Bell
- Released: 1997
- Recorded: Signpost Studios, Winnipeg, Manitoba, Canada, et al
- Genre: Contemporary Christian music
- Length: 53:26
- Label: Signpost Music
- Producer: Steve Bell and Dave Zeglinski

Steve Bell chronology
| The Feast of Seasons (1995) | Romantics & Mystics (1997) | Beyond a Shadow (1999) |

Professional ratings
Review scores
| Source | Rating |
|---|---|
| Cross Rhythms | 10/10 stars |
| Romantics and Mystics at AllMusic | |

Romantics & Mystics is the fifth album by Steve Bell. The album won the Juno Award for Best Gospel Album of the Year at the Juno Awards of 1998. The song "Moon Over Birkenau" later received a 2008 GMA Canada nomination for Instrumental Song Of The Year.

== Related ==
Song Book, Romantics & Mystics (1997)

== Track listing ==
1. "Dark Night of the Soul" - 4:41
2. "Here by the Water" - 4:54
3. "Remember Me" - 3:53
4. "Alone Tonight" - 3:58
5. "Drumheller Circle" - 2:12
6. "All for a Loveless Night" - 4:04
7. "Moon Over Birkenau'" - 5:45
8. "Lament for a Nation" - 4:34
9. "Keeping Vigil" - 4:53
10. "This is Love" - 4:40
11. "Can I Go With You" - 4:27
12. "Let's Do It Again" - 5:06

Words and music by Steve Bell except "Here by the Water" and "Keeping Vigil" by Jim Croegaert.
