= Starfield Technologies =

Web hosting company

- Current owner: GoDaddy
- Country: United States
- Markets: World
- Website: starfieldtech.com

Starfield Technologies is a company founded as a spin-off from GoDaddy in 2003, the American internet domain registrar and web hosting company that also sells e-business related software and services. Starfield handles research and design for GoDaddy's web based services, developing technologies and tools to support the company and their customers.

== Criticism ==
There are a growing number of concerned users of Starfield's software, due to the subtlety, invasiveness, and potential privacy-breaching nature of their 'Workspace Installer' tool. Once installed the program creates a shortcut on the desktop called 'Workspace Desktop'. The tool promotes its use as an extension of the GoDaddy web interface, allowing users added functionality, such as drag-and-dropping media files into their GoDaddy web based email client, desktop notification, and others.

On Mac devices it requires root privileges; the same is also true for older versions of the installer for Windows in that it requires administrator privileges to install. Newer Windows versions install using normal user privileges and only in the user account that invokes the installer. Once installed it becomes apparent that the application has been developed in a suspicious way as its location in the file system is not easily found. Older versions of the tool on Windows hides itself because the uninstall application is not found within Windows' native program removal interface. Newer versions on Windows appear in the Program and Features listing under the Control Panel and are readily uninstalled.

The program runs silently in the background and never shows any visible signs of its presence except for system resource usage, which has also been found by some users to be at times notably high. Again, with older versions of the program the persistence of the application pack also lends itself to criticism because uninstalling or removing permissions of any part of the application can result in one of the remaining modules to ask for re-installation or elevated privileges. It also silently installs plug-ins to Firefox browser, which are more persistent than the similar but more simply removed extensions.

The criticisms might have had an effect on the developer because many of the worst characteristics of the program have been removed from newer versions of the program. New versions do not require elevated privileges, uninstall properly, and the program is visible via a desktop shortcut.

This initial analysis has been deemed Starfield's Workspace "a nasty and abusive application that performs remote activities and installation of unwanted plug-ins and application without user consent. It is a bloatware and a backdoor."
