= Riley Armstrong (album) =

Studio album by Riley Armstrong
- Released: March 14, 2000
- Genre: Acoustic, Pop, Christian
- Length: 39:17
- Label: Flicker
- Producer: Riley Armstrong

Riley Armstrong chronology
Novel Reason (1998)	Riley Armstrong (2000)	Whatever The Weather (2002)

Professional ratings
Review scores
Source	Rating
Jesus Freak Hideout	4/5 stars

Riley Armstrong is the self-titled debut album of Christian singer-songwriter Riley Armstrong, released in 2000 (see: 2000 in music). It marked the replacement of his stage name Plain Edson with his real name. Riley had previously released the album Novel Reason under his pseudonym. Riley Armstrong also marked the debut of newly formed Flicker Records. The album includes a cover of Simon and Garfunkel's "Bridge over Troubled Water."

== Track listing ==
1. "Intro"
2. "Sunray"
3. "> (Greater Than)"
4. "Reborn"
5. "The Table"
6. "Bridge over Troubled Water"
7. "Sleep"
8. "Watching Out for Tristyn"
9. "The Only"
10. "9 Point 8"
11. "Paper Cup"
