= I Will Go =

Studio album by Starfield
- Released: March 25, 2008
- Genre: Contemporary Christian music
- Length: 50:42
- Label: Sparrow
- Producer: Ed Cash; Allen Salmon

Starfield chronology
Beauty in the Broken (2006)	I Will Go (2008)	The Saving One (2010)

I Will Go is the third album released by the Christian music band Starfield.

== Reception ==
Professional ratings
Review scores
Source	Rating
Jesusfreakhideout	3/5 stars
Christian Music Today	2.5/5 stars

== Track listing ==
1. "From the Corners of the Earth" (Jon Neufeld, Tim Neufeld) - 3:42
2. "Hosanna" (Brooke Fraser) - 4:04
3. "Reign in Us" (Ben Glover, Jon Neufeld, Tim Neufeld) - 5:34
4. "Holy Is Our God" (Jon Neufeld, Tim Neufeld) - 5:33
5. "I Will Go" (Jon Neufeld, Tim Neufeld, Allen Salmon)- 3:17
6. "Remain" (Ben Cantelon) - 4:56
7. "All We Need" (Jon Neufeld, Tim Neufeld) - 5:31
8. "Great in All the Earth" (Jon Neufeld, Tim Neufeld, Gordie Cochran)- 4:48
9. "The Loveliest Sound" (Jason Ingram, Jon Neufeld, Tim Neufeld) - 4:11
10. "Hiding Place" (Jon Neufeld, Tim Neufeld) - 4:34

== Credits ==
Starfield

- Tim Neufeld – vocals, acoustic guitars
- Jon Neufeld – vocals, electric guitars
- Dave Crisp – bass guitar
- Gordie Cochran – drums

Additional musicians

- Matt Stanfield – programming (1, 6, 7)
- Allen Salmon – programming (2–5, 8–10), additional guitars (2–5, 8–10), backing vocals (2–5, 8–10)
- Adrian Bradford – additional programming (2–5, 8–10)
- Andy Walker – additional programming (2–5, 8–10)
- Ed Cash – additional guitars (1, 6, 7)
- Rob Hawkins – additional guitars (1, 6, 7)
- Tony Lucido – bass guitar
- Ben Phillips – additional drums (2–5, 8–10)

=== Production ===
- Brad O'Donnell – A&R
- Ed Cash – producer (1, 6, 7), engineer (1, 6, 7), mixing (1, 6, 7)
- Allen Salmon – producer (2–5, 8–10), engineer (2–5, 8–10), mixing (2–5, 8–10), drum engineer (2–5, 8–10)
- Lee Bridges – mixing (1, 6, 7)
- Matt Armstrong – assistant engineer (1, 6, 7)
- Ben Phillips – drum engineer (2–5, 8–10)
- Chris Janz – assistant engineer (2–5, 8–10)
- Steve Klassen – assistant engineer (2–5, 8–10)
- Bob Boyd – mastering at Ambient Digital (Houston, Texas)
- Jesse Chambers – A&R administration
- Andy Walker – production assistant (2–5, 8–10)
- Starfield – design, artwork
- Fabric – design, artwork
- The Visual Republic – production design
- Ameris – photography
