= The Saving One =

Studio album by Starfield
- Released: February 23, 2010
- Studio: The Holiday Ian (Franklin, Tennessee): Superphonic (Nashville, Tennessee)
- Genre: Contemporary Christian music
- Length: 38:32
- Label: Sparrow Records
- Producer: Ian Eskelin

Starfield chronology
I Will Go (2008)	The Saving One (2010)	The Kingdom (2012)

The Saving One is the fourth studio album released by Starfield on February 23, 2010. The album was nominated in the category of Contemporary Christian/Gospel Album of the Year for the Juno Awards of 2011.

== Track listing ==
All lyrics are written by Tim Neufeld and Jon Neufeld, except where noted; all music is composed by Starfield.

No.	Title	Writer(s)	Length
1.	"The Saving One"	Tim Neufeld, Jon Neufeld, Mia Fieldes	4:07
2.	"Rediscover You"	Tim Neufeld, Jon Neufeld, Ben Glover	3:20
3.	"Declaration of Dependence"	Tim Neufeld, Jon Neufeld, Ian Eskelin	4:23
4.	"No Other Saviour"		4:26
5.	"Something to Say"		3:54
6.	"Absolutely"	Tim Neufeld, Jon Neufeld, Eskelin	3:29
7.	"Overwhelm"	Tim Neufeld, Jon Neufeld, Eskelin	3:59
8.	"Top of Our Lungs"		3:17
9.	"Glory Is Rising"	Tim Neufeld, Jon Neufeld, Eskelin	3:43
10.	"I Need a Father"	Tim Neufeld, Jon Neufeld, Ed Cash	3:29
11.	"The Saving One (Acoustic)"		3:13
Total length:			38:32

== Personnel ==
Starfield

- Tim Neufeld – vocals, acoustic piano, acoustic guitars
- Jon Neufeld – vocals, electric guitars
- James Johnston – bass
- Dave Lalonde – drums

Additional musicians

- Tim Lauer – keyboards, acoustic piano, organ
- Adrian Bradford – programming
- Aaron Shannon – programming
- Mike Payne – guitars
- Tony Lucido – bass
- Aaron Mortensen – drums
- Steve Hindalong – percussion

=== Production ===
- Brad O'Donnell – A&R
- Ian Eskelin – producer
- Barry Weeks – vocal producer, vocal engineer
- Aaron Shannon – engineer
- Ainslie Grosser – mixing
- J.R. McNeely – mixing
- Adam Hull – mix assistant
- Richard Dodd – mastering
- Jess Chambers – A&R administration
- Jan Cook – art direction
- Benji Peck – design, illustrations
- Lee Steffen – photography
