= Lianna Klassen =

Canadian Christian, Celtic musician

- Born: August 25, 1961 (age 63); Vancouver, British Columbia
- Origin: Vancouver, British Columbia, Canada
- Genres: Celtic music, Christian New Age, Folk
- Occupation(s): singer, songwriter, producer
- Instrument(s): guitar, piano, vocals
- Years active: 1995–present
- Labels: Dawntreader Productions
- Website: liannaklassen.com

Lianna Klassen is a Canadian Christian Celtic and Christian New Age-influenced musician, songwriter, speaker and worship leader. A Juno Award nominee and GMA Canada Covenant Award winner, Klassen has released seven albums to date. Her compositions are chants, hymns and meditations on the themes of praise, prayer and worship. Stylistically they have also included Christmas carols, contemporary praise, country music and Christian folk. Notable songs written by Lianna include: "Song for Canada", "I will Not Be Silent" and "Song of Declaration."

Klassen was born on August 25, 1961, in Vancouver, British Columbia and has been based out of Abbotsford, British Columbia, Calgary, Alberta, and most recently, Montreal, Quebec. Lianna was a worship leader at Northview Community Church in Abbotsford for several years. She wrote her first gospel song at the age of 14 and has been performing since the age of eight. Klassen is married and has three children. Her son Jordan Klassen is a singer-songwriter.

== Discography ==
Swept off Your Feet

- Released: 1995
- Tracks: "Fall On Your Knees", "Our God Is Good", "King Of All Kings", "Song Of Job Song Of Faithfulness", "Family Tree", "God Most High", "Firm Foundation", "Victory Won", "Abba Father", "Song Of Blessing", "Song for My Children", "My Jesus I Love Thee"

Listen to the Sound (reviews)

- Released: 1998
- Tracks: "Listen to the Sound", "Lord You Have Searched Me", "Trust in His Hand", "Salvation", "Doors and Windows", "Shekinah", "Pilgrim's Progress", "Romans 8", "Midst Of It All", "Beautiful", "Morning Call (Psalm 5)"

Love in the Ruins, Hope in the Wasteland (reviews)

- Released: 2001
- Tracks: "Proclamation", "Song Of Declaration", "I will Not Be Silent", "The Intercessor", "Shine Down", "The Way", "Love in the Ruins", "God Of Wonder", "Incense to the Father", "I will Run With You", "The Voice", "Sweet Contentment", "Song For Canada"

Once Upon a Time Forever After (review)

- Released: 2002
- Tracks: "Anticipation", "Once Upon A Time Forever After", "The Women's Song", "Zecharia's Song", "Gloria Deo", "The Wise Men Interlude", "O Little Town Of Bethlehem", "Celebrate Emmanuel", "Huron Carol", "Listen To You Breathe", "Once Upon A Time Forever After (Instrumental)"

Out of Borderland (reviews)

- Released: 2004
- Tracks: "Let All Who Have Breath", "Sing!", "Borderland", "Song Of Unity", "When I Survey The Wondrous Cross", "History Belongs", "Letting Go", "You Are God And You Are Wonderful", "Veni Sancte Spiritus", "Travel With Me", "My Shepherd", "Serendipity"

The Guest (reviews)

- Released: 2007
- Tracks: "Laudate Dominum", "Morning Prayer", "Adoramus Te Christe", "God Eternal", "Adoramus Te Christe (Reprise)", "Celtic Blessing", "Veni Sancte Spiritus", "Lord Have Mercy / Pray", "Repentance Lament", "I Am", "Alleluia", "Take Your Place", "Alleluia (Reprise)", "I See His Blood Upon The Rose", "Sleeping Prayer"

Song for Ireland

- Released: 2009
- Format: EP
- Tracks: "Song For Ireland", "Hear Our Cry", "Listen To You Breathe"

Songs of the Journey – The Story Goes On...

- Released: 2011
- Format: CD
- Tracks: "First Breath / The Traveller's Song", "Hide Me Away", "I Am What I Am", "Song of Adoration", "Yours", "True Religion (A Cry for Mercy)", "Glorificamus Tel", "The Old Rugged Cross", "Sacred Waste", "The Story Goes On..."

=== Songs on compilations ===
- Window of Hope, "Song of Declaration", "Doors and Windows", "Listen to the Sound" & "Salvation" (Gospel Music Foundation, 2002)
- Sea to Sea: I See The Cross, "You Are God And You Are Wonderful" (CMC, 2005)
- Sea to Sea: The Voice of Creation, "Celtic Blessings: You Are The Peace" (CMC, 2007)
- Sea to Sea: Christmas, "Huron Carol" (Lakeside, 2009)

=== Notable appearances ===
- duet with Graham Ord on: "Like Joshua of old", on his album: Regarding the Maker (Knewsense Records, 2005)

== Awards and recognition ==
GMA Canada Covenant Awards

- 2001 Contemporary Gospel Album of the Year: Love In the Ruins, Hope In the Wasteland
- 2001 Inspirational Song of the Year: "Song for Canada"
- 2005 nominee, Inspirational Album of the Year: Out of Borderland
- 2007 nominee, Folk/Roots Song of the Year: "Celtic Blessing"
- 2007 nominee, Inspirational Song of the Year: "I Am"
- 2007 nominee, Instrumental Song of the Year: "Repentance Lament"
- 2007 nominee, Folk/Roots Album of the Year: The Guest
- 2007 nominee, Album of the Year: The Guest
- 2011 Inspirational Album of the Year: Songs For The Journey – The Story Goes On...

Juno Awards

- 1999 nominee, Best Gospel Album: Listen to the Sound

Shai Awards (formerly The Vibe Awards)

- 2002 nominee, Female Vocalist of the Year
- 2002 nominee, Contemporary/Pop Album Of The Year: Love In the Ruins, Hope In the Wasteland
- 2002 nominee, Worship Album of the Year: Love In the Ruins, Hope In the Wasteland
- 2002 nominee, Song of the Year: "Song for Canada"
- 2003 nominee, Female Vocalist of the Year
- 2003 nominee, Inspirational Album Of The Year: Once Upon A Time Forever After
- 2004 Seasonal Album Of The Year: Once Upon a Time Forever After
- 2004 nominee, Female Soloist of the Year
- 2004 nominee, Song of the Year: "The Women's Song"
- 2005 nominee, Female Vocalist of the Year
- 2005 nominee, Inspirational Album of the Year: Out of Borderland
