= Beauty in the Broken =

Studio album by Starfield
- Released: May 16, 2006
- Studio: Ed's (Franklin, Tennessee): Pentavarit, Bridge Street Studios and Sound Stage Studios (Nashville, Tennessee)
- Genre: Contemporary Christian music
- Length: 50:42
- Label: Sparrow
- Producer: Ed Cash: Matt Bronleewe

Starfield chronology
Starfield (2004)	Beauty in the Broken (2006)	I Will Go (2008)

Professional ratings
Review scores
Source	Rating
AllMusic	3.5/5 stars
Jesus Freak Hideout	3.5/5 stars
Cross Rhythms	9/10 stars

Beauty in the Broken is the third album released by the Christian music band Starfield. It was a 2007 Juno Award nominee for Contemporary Christian/Gospel Album of the Year. The album includes the song "Son of God" recorded with Chris Tomlin. The single "Everything is Beautiful" was the 17th most played song on Christian Hit Radio in 2007.

Beauty in the Broken immediately went to the top of the Canadian Christian music sales chart and remained at the No. 1 position for three months. 2006 Year End charts placed the album at No. 2 for the year in Canada at Christian retail stores. The album peaked at No. 31 in the United States on the Billboard Top Christian Albums chart, and at No. 45 on the Billboard Top Heatseekers chart.

== Track listing ==
All songs written by Jon Neufeld and Tim Neufeld, except where noted.

1. "My Generation" (Jon Neufeld, Tim Neufeld, Douglas Kaine McKelvey) – 4:34
2. "The Hand That Holds the World" (J. Neufeld, T. Neufeld, Matt Bronleewe, Jason Ingram) – 4:46
3. "Son of God" [featuring Chris Tomlin] – 4:23
4. "Everything Is Beautiful" (J. Neufeld, T. Neufeld, McKelvey) – 4:05
5. "Captivate" – 4:51
6. "Great Is The Lord" (J. Neufeld, T. Neufeld, McKelvey) – 4:54
7. "Unashamed" (J. Neufeld, T. Neufeld, McKelvey) – 5:04
8. "Love Is The Reversal" (J. Neufeld, T. Neufeld, McKelvey) – 3:58
9. "Obsession" – 5:32
10. "Glorious One" – 4:42
11. "Shipwreck" – 4:04

== Personnel ==
Starfield

- Tim Neufeld – vocals, acoustic guitars, electric guitars
- Jon Neufeld – acoustic guitars, electric guitars, vocals
- Shaun Huberts – bass
- Gordie Cochran – drums

Additional musicians

- Ed Cash
- Jeremy Bose
- Matt Bronleewe
- Paul Moak
- Tony Lucido
- James Gregory
- Dan Needham
- Josh Robinson
- Scott Williamson
- Chris Tomlin – guest vocals (3)

=== Production ===
- Brad O'Donnell – executive producer
- Ed Cash – producer (1, 3–7, 10, 11), engineer (1, 3–7, 10, 11), mixing (1, 3–7, 10, 11)
- Matt Bronleewe – producer (2, 8, 9)
- Rusty Varenkamp – engineer (2, 8, 9)
- F. Reid Shippen – mixing (2, 8, 9)
- Lee Bridges – assistant engineer, editing
- Steve Lotz – assistant engineer
- Bob Boyd – mastering at Ambient Digital (Houston, Texas)
- Alice Smith – production coordinator (2, 8, 9)
- Dave Steunebrink – production coordinator (2, 8, 9)
- Jess Chambers – A&R administration
- Holly Meyers – A&R administration
- Jan Cook – creative director
- Alexis Goodman – art direction
- Jeremy Cowart – photography
- Christina Nichols – management
