= Hokus Pick =

Canadian Christian rock band

- Also known as: Hokus Pick Manouver
- Origin: Vancouver, British Columbia, Canada
- Genres: Christian rock, contemporary Christian music
- Years active: 1989–1999
- Labels: Word Canada, Via, Freedom
- Past members: Matt Pierrot; Rick Colhoun; Russ Smith; David Strilchuk

Hokus Pick (or Hokus Pick Manouver) was a Christian rock band that was together from 1989 to 1999. The four members of Hokus Pick met in Vancouver, British Columbia, Canada. Hokus Pick was well known for their quirky sense of humour, using sarcasm, satire, and general silliness to convey a deeper message.

Hokus Pick toured extensively in Canada and the United States. The band opened for Steve Taylor's Squinternational tour in 1994 and played in Costa Rica in May 1998. The group released their final album in 1999, opting to spend more time with their families after more than a decade of recording and touring together. They have remained active in music ministry and the industry.

The Encyclopedia of Contemporary Christian Music cites their song "I'm So Happy" as possibly the worst CCM song of all time. The song is a satire of simplistic lyrics often heard on Christian radio. Ironically, it received heavy rotation on Christian stations.

In October 2007, Hokus Pick received a Lifetime Achievement Award from the Canadian Gospel Music Association at the 29th Annual Covenant Awards in Calgary, Alberta. Hokus Pick then performed live and hosted the 30th Annual Covenant Awards on October 24, 2008.

Rumours abounded that Hokus Pick was planning a comeback into music, after having been spotted in a secluded warehouse jamming together. Filmmaking company Transposition Films, composed of legendary members itself, avoided questions regarding their involvement in filming a documentary about the process.

== Members ==
- Russ Smith – lead vocals, guitar
- Matt Pierrot – guitar, vocals
- Dave Strilchuk – bass guitar, vocals
- Rick Colhoun – drums, vocals

== Discography ==
- Hokus Pick Manouver (independent) (1988)
- Hey Man! (independent) (1989)
- Pick It Up (1992, review)
- The Independents (1993)
- Brothers from Different Mothers (1994, review)
- Brothers From Different Mothers (video) (1994)
- Bookaboom (1995)
- The B-Sides (1996)
- Snappy (1997, reviews)
- Greatest Picks (1998)
- Super Duper (1999, reviews)

=== Songs in other projects ===
- "We Are the People" on Believe It, Various Artists (Revival, 1999)
- GMA Canada presents 30th Anniversary Collection, "I'm So Happy" (CMC, 2008)

=== Further reading ===
- "Hokus Pick". 7ball (4). January–February 1996.
