= Starfield (album) =

Studio album by Starfield
- Released: May 18, 2004
- Studio: Masterlink, Pentavarit, and Fireside Studios (Nashville, Tennessee): Planet of The Tapes (Los Angeles, California)
- Genre: Contemporary Christian Music
- Label: Sparrow
- Producer: Matt Bronleewe

Starfield chronology
Tumbling After (2003)	Starfield (2004)	Beauty in the Broken (2006)

Professional ratings
Review scores
Source	Rating
Allmusic	3.5/5 stars
Jesus Freak Hideout	3.5/5 stars
Cross Rhythms	10/10 stars

Starfield is the first major label album by the Christian music band Starfield. It was released on May 18, 2004, by Sparrow Records.

== Track listing ==
All songs written by Jon Neufeld and Tim Neufeld, except where noted.

1. "Filled with Your Glory (Prelude)" - 0:37
2. "Filled with Your Glory" - 3:35
3. "Love Break Me" - 4:42
4. "Revolution" (Jon Neufeld, Tim Neufeld, Matt Bronleewe) - 4:18
5. "Alive in This Moment" - 4:07
6. "Tumbling After" - 3:26
7. "Outstretched Hands" - 5:15
8. "Ordinary Life" (Jon Neufeld, Tim Neufield, Matt Bronleewe) - 4:25
9. "Over My Head" - 7:28
10. "Can I Stay Here Forever?" - 4:24
11. "All for You" - 5:17
12. "Cry in My Heart" - 5:52

== Personnel ==
Starfield

- Tim Neufeld – vocals, acoustic guitars
- Jon Neufeld – electric guitars, backing vocals
- Shaun Huberts – bass
- John Andrews – drums

Additional musicians

- Matt Bronleewe – keyboards, additional guitars
- Jeremy Bose – keyboards (2, 5, 6)
- Phil Madeira – Hammond B3 organ (5-7, 10)
- James Gregory – bass
- Lindsay Jamieson – drums
- David Henry – cello (5, 7, 10, 11)
- City of Prague Philharmonic Orchestra – strings (9, 11)
- Keith Getty –orchestrations and conductor (9, 11)
- Joni McCabe – orchestral assistant (9, 11)
- Lucie Svehlova – concertmaster (9, 11)

=== Production ===
- Brad O'Donnell – executive producer
- Matt Bronleewe – producer
- Aaron Swihart – recording
- Shane D. Wilson – recording
- Rob Clark – recording assistant
- Dave Salley – recording assistant
- Chris Henning – additional Pro Tools editing
- Jan Holzner – string recording at Barrandov Studios and Smeeky Soundstage (Prague, Czech Republic)
- J.R. McNeely – mixing at Sound Kitchen (Franklin, Tennessee)
- Adam Deane – mix assistant
- Matt Weeks – mix assistant
- Richard Dodd – mastering
- Alice Smith – production coordinator
- Jan Cook – creative director
- Alexis Goodman – art direction, design, illustration
- Stewart Cohen – cover photography
- Ben Pearson – back and inside photography
