= The Kingdom (Starfield album) =

Studio album by Starfield
- Released: January 31, 2012
- Studio: Das Studio (Nashville, Tennessee)
- Genre: Contemporary Christian music
- Length: 43:00
- Label: Tone Tree Music
- Producer: Allen Salmon

Starfield chronology
The Saving One (2010)	The Kingdom (2012)

The Kingdom is the fifth studio album by Starfield, released on January 31, 2012.

== Reception ==
The album entered the Canadian Albums Chart at No. 66.

== Track listing ==
All music is composed by Starfield.

No.	Title	Writer(s)	Length
1.	"Natural Disaster"	Jon Neufeld, Tim Neufeld, Allen Salmon	3:41
2.	"Burn for You"	J. Neufeld, T. Neufeld, Salmon	4:07
3.	"The Kingdom"	J. Neufeld, T. Neufeld, Salmon	4:25
4.	"Just Surrender"	J. Neufeld, T. Neufeld, Salmon	4:30
5.	"Heart and Flesh"	J. Neufeld, T. Neufeld, Salmon	4:23
6.	"I Have Decided"	Traditional	4:33
7.	"All I Want Is You"	J. Neufeld, T. Neufeld	3:57
8.	"Innocence (And Other Things Lost)"	J. Neufeld, T. Neufeld, Salmon, Jon Bryant	4:18
9.	"Speak Now Jesus"	J. Neufeld, T. Neufeld	4:36
10.	"Light of the World"	J. Neufeld, T. Neufeld, Salmon	4:36

== Personnel ==
Starfield

- Tim Neufeld – vocals, backing vocals, keyboards, acoustic guitars, electric guitars
- Jon Neufeld – vocals, backing vocals, keyboards, acoustic guitars, electric guitars
- James Johnston – bass guitar
- Dave Lalonde – drums

Additional musicians

- Allen Salmon – keyboards, programming, acoustic guitars, bass guitar, backing vocals

Group vocals

- Seth Jones, Joe Kane, Emily Lutz, Jon Neufeld, Tim Neufeld, Allen Salmon and Rhett Walker

=== Production ===
- Jon Neufeld – executive producer
- Tim Neufeld – executive producer
- Allen Salmon – producer, recording, mixing
- Dan Shike – mastering at Tone and Volume Mastering (Nashville, Tennessee)
- Joe Courtney – back cover photography
- Katie Moore – album artwork
- Chris Nichols – management
