= Shaun Huberts =

- Born: 14 January 1981 (age 44)
- Origin: Victoria, British Columbia, Canada
- Genres: Alternative rock, Folk, Jazz, Country, Funk
- Occupation(s): Bass guitarist, Session musician, Songwriter
- Instrument: Bass guitar

Shaun Huberts (born 14 January 1981) is a musician, songwriter, and producer and was the bassist for the Christian contemporary band Starfield until 2006. He was bassist for indie rock band Tegan and Sara up until 2010. He is also a member of the band Rococode

== Early life ==
Shaun Huberts picked up his first bass when he was ten. He immediately began playing in school concert and jazz bands, adding church gigs and other groups in high school. Moving to Los Angeles when he was 20, Shaun attended the Los Angeles Music Academy, learning the skills necessary to move to the next level. Since then, he's been playing everything from Rock, Pop and Funk, to Country and Jazz, touring almost constantly in the US and Europe. He's also done session work in Victoria, LA and Nashville.

== Equipment ==
Shaun uses an Eden WT800 to power a pair of 410XLTs. According to the Eden website, he chose Eden because "[he] care[s] about tone. No matter where [he is] or what style [he's] playing, [his] gear always sounds great."
