= Jeff Watt =

Canadian curator (born 1957)

- Born: March 23, 1957
- Known for: curator

Jeff Watt (born March 23, 1957) is a scholar and curator of Himalayan and Tibetan Art and well known translator of Tibetan texts.

Since 1998 he has been the Director and Chief Curator of the Himalayan Art Resources (HAR) website, a comprehensive on-line resource for Himalayan art and iconography that features thousands of artworks from Tibet, Nepal, Bhutan, and Mongolia with a catalog of about 60,000 images written by Watt. From October 1999 until October 2007 Watt was also the founding Curator and leading scholar at the Rubin Museum of Art (RMA) in New York City which houses one of the largest collections of Himalayan and Tibetan art in North America.

== Early life ==
Watt began studying Tibetan Buddhism in Seattle, Washington with Dezhung Rinpoche as a teenager and dropped out of school to take monk's vows at the age of seventeen in 1974. He gave back his vows in 1985 but continued his studies and also undertook traditional retreats.

== Publications ==
- Watt, Jeff. "Sakya Resource Guide". Sakya Resource Guide. Jeff Watt.
- Watt, Jeff. "Himalayan Art Resources". Himalayan Art Resources. The Rubin Foundation.
- Mullin, Glenn H.; Watt, Jeff (2003). Female Buddhas, Women of Enlightenment in Tibetan Mystical Art. Santa Fe: Clear Light Publishers. ISBN 1-57416-068-0.
- Watt, Jeff; Linrothe, Rob; Luczanits, Christian (June 2004). "Turning A Blind Eye". Orientations. Orientations Magazine Ltd. 73-74.
- Linrothe, Rob; Watt, Jeff (2004). Demonic Divine, Himalayan Art & Beyond. Chicago: Serindia. ISBN 1-932476-15-6.
- Karmay, Samten G; Watt, Jeff (2007). Bon, The Magic Word: the indigenous religion of Tibet. New York: Philip Wilson Publishers. ISBN 9780856676499. LCCN 2007041891.
- Watt, Jeff (August 2007). "Gaton Ngawang Lekpa". Treasury of Lives.
- Brauen, Martin; Watt, Jeff (2009). Mandala, Sacred Circle in Tibetan Buddhism. Stuttgart: Arnoldsche Art Publishers. ISBN 978-3-89790-305-0. (contains 18 articles by Jeff Watt)
- Watt, Jeff (Fall 2009). "The Sakya Tradition: A Brief Overview". Bodhi, the Voice of Vajrayana Buddhism. 10 (3).
- Watt, Jeff (21 February 2013). "Himalayan Buddhist Art 101". Tricycle. The Tricycle Foundation.

== Curated exhibitions ==
- Female Buddhas, Women of Enlightenment in Tibetan Mystical Art, Glenn Mullin, Jeff Watt (Atlanta: 2001)
- Demonic Divine, Rob Linrothe & Jeff Watt (New York: 2004; Phoenix, Arizona: 2005)
- RMA Opening Exhibitions, (New York: 2004)
- Female Buddhas, Women of Enlightenment in Himalayan Art, Jeff Watt, Tenzin Dharlo, Monty McKeever (New York :2005; Connecticut: 2005; Dallas, Texas: 2006)
- What Is It? Concept & object selection, Jeff Watt & Tenzin Dharlo (New York: 2005)
- Karmapa, The Black Hat Lama of Tibet, Jeff Watt & Tenzin Dharlo (New York: 2005)
- Dalai Lama, Jeff Watt & Tenzin Dharlo (New York: 2005)
- Wutaishan, Pilgrimage to the Five Peaked Mountain, Jeff Watt & Karl Debreczeny (New York: 2007)
- Bon: The Magic Word, Jeff Watt & Samten Karmey (New York: 2007)
- Big Himalayan Art (New York: 2007; Dallas: 2008)
- From the Land of the Gods: Art of the - Kathmandu Valley, David Pritzker under the Direction of Jeff Watt (New York: 2008)
- Red, Black & Gold, David Pritzker under the Direction of Jeff Watt (New York: 2008)
- Tibet House Repatriation Collection Exhibition, Honoring Jack & Murial Zimmerman, Jeff Watt (New York: 2008)
