= Starfield (band) =

Canadian Christian rock band

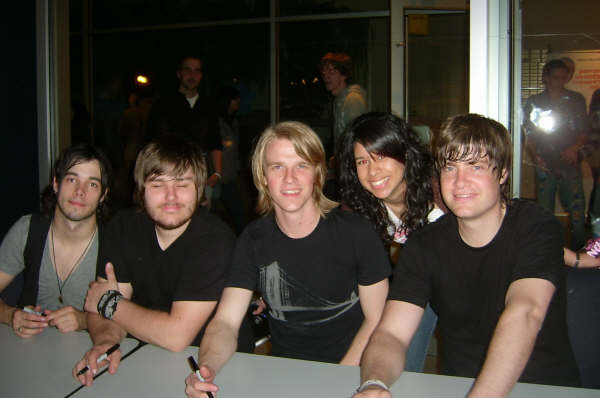
- Left to right: David Crisp, Gordie Cochran, Jon Neufeld, fan, Tim Neufeld

Background information
- Origin: Winnipeg, Manitoba, Canada
- Genres: Christian rock, CCM
- Years active: 2000–present
- Labels: Sparrow, independent
- Members: Tim Neufeld; Jon Neufeld; Colin Trask; Greg Peace
- Past members: John Andrews; Adrian Bradford; Mike Hill; Ben Peterson; Shaun Huberts; Dave Crisp; Carlin Lemon; Dave Miller; Gordie Cochran; Dave Lalonde; James Johnston
- Website: www.starfieldonline.com

Starfield is a Canadian Christian music group from Winnipeg, Manitoba. The group has songs and albums that have charted in Canada, the United Kingdom, and the United States. They have won multiple GMA Canada Covenant Awards (Canada's Dove Awards), received four Juno nominations, five Vibes, and the Prairie Music Award for best Christian album.

== Origins ==
The band was started by Tim and Jon Neufeld who were leading worship at their small church in Winnipeg. They started out making demos in former members Dave Miller and Adrian Bradford’s basements, resulting in their first two independent albums Starfield and Tumbling After, which sold more than 20,000 units in Canada alone. "The fact that we sold any CDs to more people than just friends and family, or that we won any awards, still blows my mind," Tim said "we really just thought it would be fun to record some stuff for memory's sake. What has happened is just an amazing testimony to God's faithfulness!" The band's vision in music is: "To lift up Jesus so he is impossible to ignore."

The name "Starfield" was adopted from Bruce Cockburn's 1976 song named "Lord of the Starfields".

== History ==
The release of their self-titled debut album (2004) introduced the band to a whole new audience in the United States. When it came time for recording the follow-up to the critically acclaimed record, Starfield teamed up with Bronleewe (Michael W. Smith, dc Talk, Plumb) for a second time while also enlisting the talents of GMA Award-winning producer Ed Cash (Chris Tomlin, David Crowder Band, Steven Curtis Chapman). The end result was, Beauty in the Broken (2006).

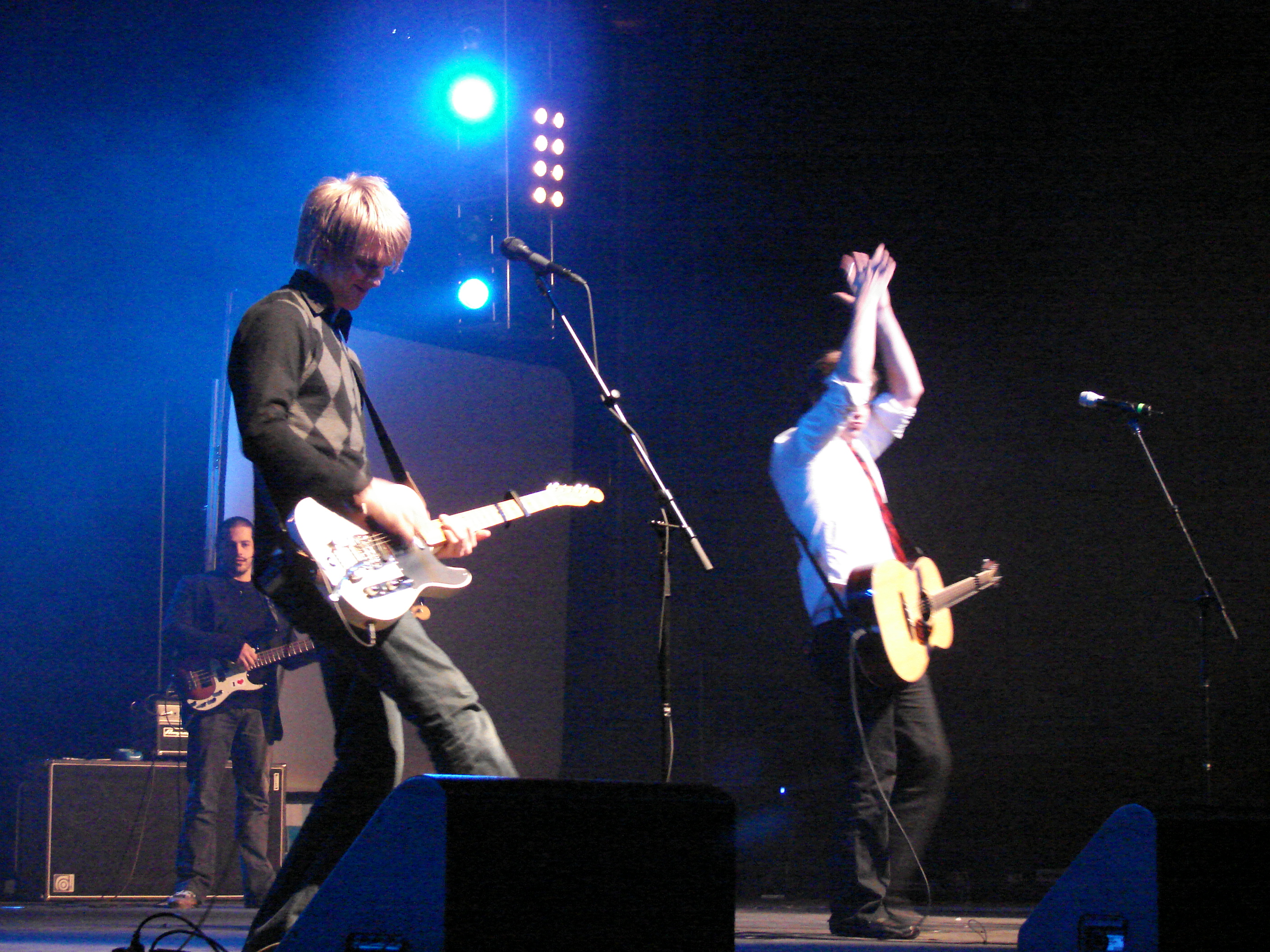
Starfield in concert

"When we began writing songs for Beauty in the Broken, our goal was to make a corporate worship record an album for the church", explains Tim Neufeld, the group's primary lyricist. "However, as we got deeper into the process of music and lyric, we couldn't get away from our need to first address the often nagging disconnect between us and God its tough to march right into a song like Great is the Lord without first acknowledging the distance that exists between us and God. At the end of the day we felt like Beauty in the Broken was an incomplete worship record without songs like "My Generation," "Captivate," and "Shipwreck" that fess up to the pain, condemnation, and doubt that often get in the way of true intimacy with Jesus."

Beauty in the Broken was followed up with I Will Go in 2008 and The Saving One in 2010.

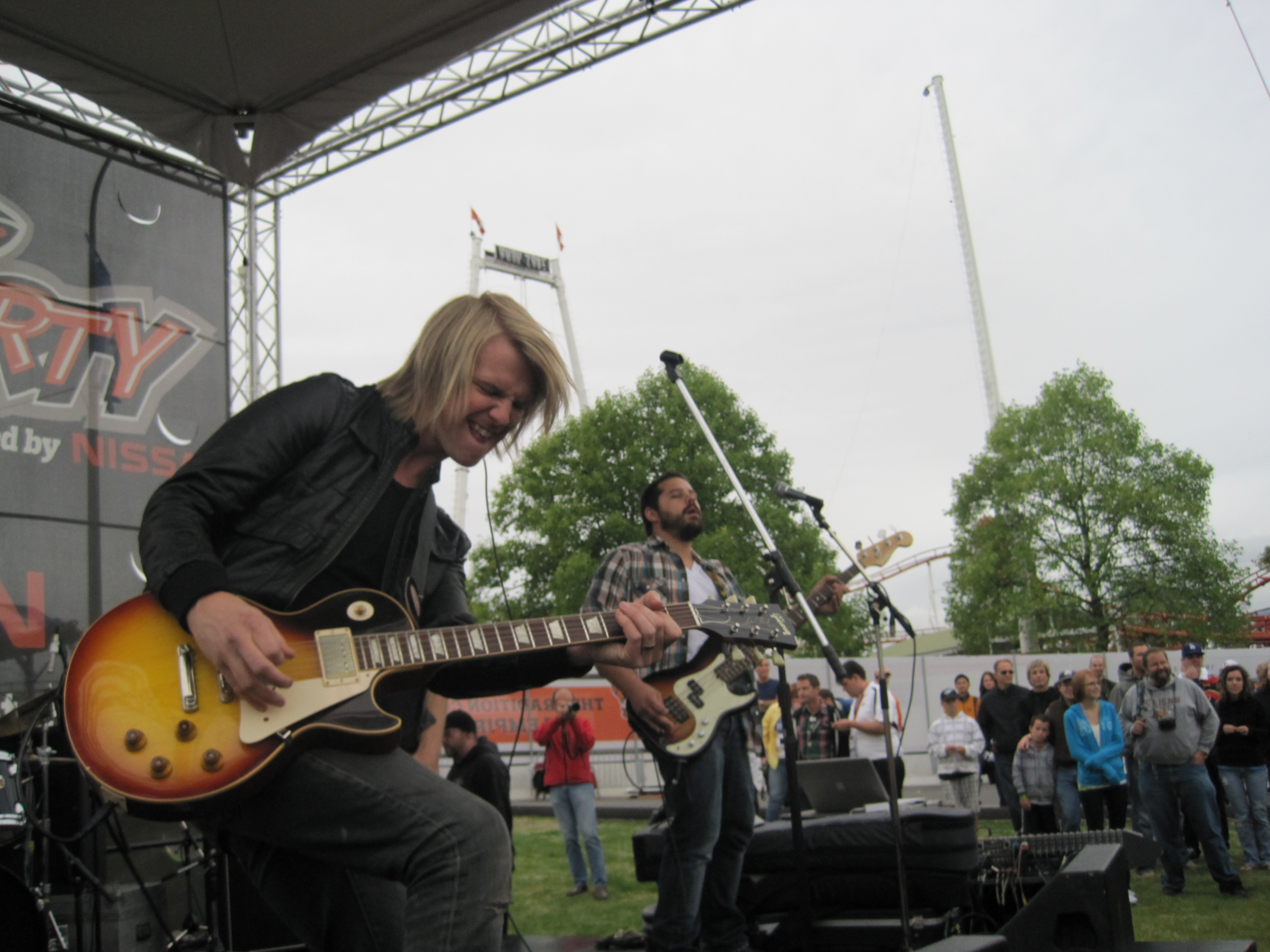
Jon Neufeld performing in 2010

The band concluded their record deal with EMI/Sparrow in early 2011. Rather than enter into a new record deal, the band went into the studio and recorded an independent record, covering all their own recording costs and negotiating distribution agreements. The result of those sessions, The Kingdom, released on January 31, 2012.

The band was on a hiatus from 2012 until the early 2019 cross-Canada Starfield Reunion Tour, with Canadian band The Color and Brooke Nichols..

=== Abbotsford church floor collapse ===
On April 25, 2008, Starfield was performing a concert at the Central Heights Church in Abbotsford, British Columbia, when the floor collapsed and a lighting scaffold fell under fans dancing in front of the stage. A number of concert-goers, mostly youth, fell through the floor into the basement. More than 40 people were injured, several seriously, but there were no fatalities. During the event, singer Tim Neufeld asked the crowd to cease dancing. When the floor collapsed, Neufeld threw his microphone aside and jumped down about 10 feet (3.0 m) to help the victims below. As a result, a concert scheduled April 26 in Burnaby, British Columbia was postponed and a concert scheduled April 28 in Red Deer, Alberta was cancelled. The Abbotsford concert was rescheduled to June 7 in another venue (Sevenoaks Alliance), while the Burnaby concert was rescheduled for June 6. Tickets purchased for the show of April 25 were redeemable at the rescheduled Abbotsford show.

== Band members ==
The two original members of Starfield: Tim (right) and Jon (left) Neufeld

- Tim Neufeld (lead vocals, guitars)
- Jon Neufeld (guitars, vocals)
- Colin Trask (drums)
- Greg Peace (bass guitar)

Starfield was originally formed by brothers Tim and Jon Neufeld, both from Winnipeg. Shaun Huberts and Gordie Cochran, both of Victoria, British Columbia, had then joined the band. Shaun Huberts left the band August 9, 2006, after his last performance at the DCLA Convention in Anaheim, California. His replacement was Dave Crisp. The band moved back to Canada (Abbotsford, British Columbia) in the fall of 2006 after several years of living in Nashville. Soon after their North American tour with Shane and Shane, both Dave Crisp and Gordie Cochran moved on. Cochran is now playing drums on a worship team at Christian Life Assembly in Langley, British Columbia and has produced the GMA Canada Covenant Awards. James Johnston (Winnipeg, Manitoba) and Dave Lalonde (Oakville, Ontario) joined Starfield to play bass and drums, respectively. Both Johnston and Lalonde had played with the band on and off for the past eight years before signing on full-time in September 2008. As of June 2011, Starfield has a show-to-show hired bass player and drummer. Johnston left just before his first child was expected to be born, and Lalonde left just after the band's East Coast of Canada "Saving One" tour.

Former members

- Dave Lalonde – drums
- James Johnston – bass guitar
- John Andrews – drums
- Adrian Bradford
- Mike Hill
- Ben Peterson
- Shaun Huberts
- Dave Crisp
- Carlin Lemon
- Dave Miller
- Gordie Cochran

== Discography ==
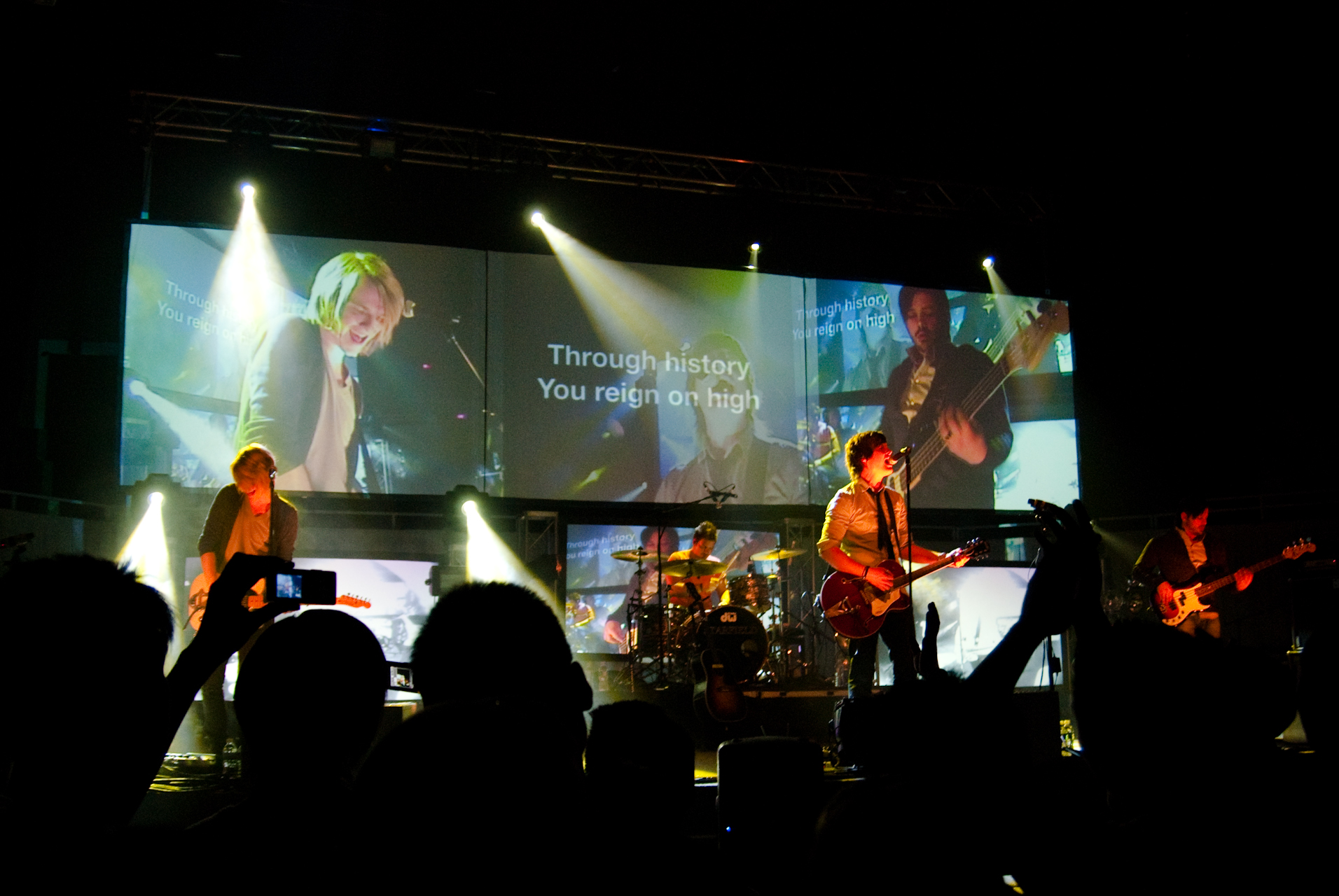
Starfield in 2009

- Starfield (2001)
- Tumbling After (2002)
- Starfield (2004)
- Beauty in the Broken (2006)
- I Will Go (2008)
- The Saving One (2010)
- The Kingdom (2012)

== Awards ==
Gospel Music Association Canada Covenant Awards

- 2005 Special Events/Compilation of the Year: Sea to Sea: Filled With Your Glory
- 2006 Group of the Year
- 2006 Album of the Year: Beauty in the Broken
- 2006 Pop/Contemporary Album of the Year: Beauty in the Broken
- 2006 Song of the Year: "Son of God"
- 2007 Group of the Year
- 2007 Blessings Fan Choice Award
- 2007 Rock Song of the Year: "The Hand That Holds The World"
- 2007 Recorded Song of the Year: "The Hand That Holds The World"
- 2008 six awards including: Artist of the Year, Group of the Year, Album of the Year: I Will Go, Modern Worship Album of the Year: I Will Go, Praise And Worship Song of the Year: "Reign In Us", and Recorded Song of the Year: "Hosanna"
- 2009 six nominations, including: Artist of the Year, Group of the Year, Song of the Year: "I Will Go", Recorded Song of the Year: "I Will Go", Rock Song of the Year: "I Will Go", Video of the Year: "I Will Go"
- 2010 Artist of the Year
- 2010 Modern Worship Album of the Year: The Saving One
- 2010 Modern Worship Song of the Year: "Glory Is Rising"

Juno Awards

Year	Nominee / work	Award	Result
2003	Tumbling After	Contemporary Christian/Gospel Album of the Year	Nominated
2007	Beauty in the Broken	Contemporary Christian/Gospel Album of the Year	Nominated
2009	I Will Go	Contemporary Christian/Gospel Album of the Year	Nominated
2011	The Saving One	Contemporary Christian/Gospel Album of the Year	Nominated

Shai Awards

- 2003 Artist of the Year
- 2003 Group of the Year
- 2003 Rock/Alternative Album of the Year: Tumbling After
- 2003 Worship Album of the Year: Tumbling After
- 2003 Song of the Year: "Alive in this Moment"
- 2004 Group of the Year
- 2005 Artist of the Year
- 2007 Artist of the Year
- 2007 Group of the Year
- 2007 Contemporary/Pop Album of the Year: Beauty in the Broken

Western Canadian Music Awards

Year	Nominee / work	Award	Result
2003	Tumbling After	Outstanding Christian Recording	Won
