= List of compositions by Charles Ives =

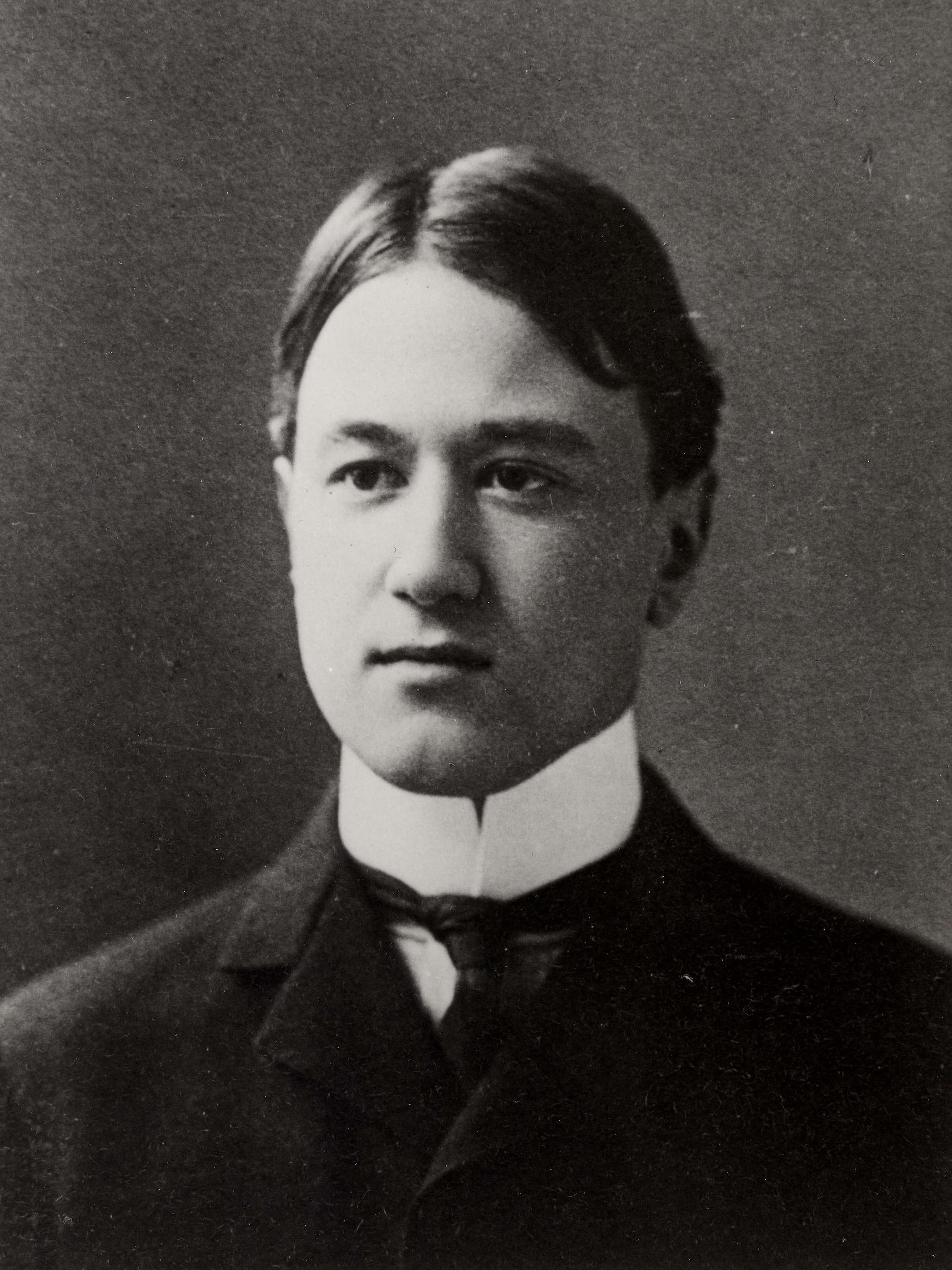
Ives's graduation portrait from Yale University, c. June 1898

The compositions of American composer Charles Ives (1874–1954) are mostly modern classical music. Ives was prolific, revised works multiple times, and left ambiguous fragments with no title or notes. A chronology of works is especially difficult because of missing and sometimes misleading dates; as Elliott Carter put it in 1939: "[Ives] has rewritten his works so many times, adding dissonances and polyrhythms, that it is impossible to tell just at what date the works assumed the surprising form we know now."

This list follows James B. Sinclair's A Descriptive Catalogue of the Music of Charles Ives. It does not include fragments or projected works.

== Orchestra ==
=== Symphonies ===
- Symphony No. 1 in D minor (1898–1902)
- Symphony No. 2 (1897–1902, revised 1910)
- Symphony No. 3: The Camp Meeting (1901–1904, rev. 1911)
- Symphony No. 4 (1916)
- Symphony No.5: New England Holidays (1919)
- Symphony No.6: Universe Symphony (1928, unfinished)

=== Sets ===
For orchestra

- Orchestral Set No. 1: Three Places in New England (1912–16, revised 1929)
- Orchestral Set No. 2 (1909–1919)
- Orchestral Set No. 3 (fragments only; 1919–26; notes added after 1934)

For chamber orchestra

- Set No. 1 (1912); includes Calcium Light Night
- Set No. 2 (1912); includes Gyp the Blood, or Hearst? Which Is Worst?
- Set No. 3 (At Sea – Luck and Work – Premonitions, 1917)
- Set No. 4, Three Poets and Human Nature – projected only
- Set No. 5, The Other Side of Pioneering, or Side Lights on American Enterprise – projected only
- Set No. 6, From the Side Hill – projected only
- Set No. 7, Water Colors – projected or lost
- Set No. 8, Songs Without Voices – projected only
- Set No. 9 of Three Pieces (The Last Reader – The See'r – The Unanswered Question, 1934)
- Set No. 10 of Three Pieces (Like a Sick Eagle – Luck and Work – The Indians, 1934)
- Set for Theatre Orchestra (1915)

=== Overtures ===
- Alcott Overture (1904, inc., but re-used for the third movement of Piano Sonata No.2)
- Emerson Overture for Piano and Orchestra or Emerson Concerto (1911–12, incomplete, but re-used for the first movement of Piano Sonata No.2)
- Matthew Arnold Overture (1912, inc.)
- Overture and March: 1776 (1904, rev. 1910; re-used in "Putnam's Camp" from Three Places in New England and Holidays Symphony)
- Overture in G Minor (1899, inc.)
- Overture: Nationals (1915, inc. sketches; adapted from Overture and March: 1776; )
- Robert Browning Overture (1914, rev. 1942)

=== Marches ===
- Holiday Quickstep (1887)
- Country Band March ((Sketched 1903), rev. 1912, inc. – used in "Putnam's Camp")
- March No. 2, with Son of a Gambolier (1895?)
- March No. 3 in F and C (1893?, inc.)
- March No. 3, with My Old Kentucky Home (1895?)
- March No. 4 in F and C (1894?, inc.)
- The Circus Band (1898)

=== Others ===
- Hymn: Largo cantabile, from A Set of Three Short Pieces (1904)
- Central Park in the Dark (1906, rev. 1936)
- Chromâtimelôdtune (1913-1919)
- Quarter-Tone Chorale for Strings (1914, lost)
- The General Slocum (1910?, inc.)
- The Gong on the Hook and Ladder or Firemen's Parade on Main Street (1911)
- Piece for Small Orchestra and Organ (1905?, mostly lost)
- The Pond (1906, rev. 1913)
- Postlude in F (1899?)
- Three Ragtime Dances (1911, mostly lost)
- Four Ragtime Dances (?)
- Nine Ragtime Pieces (1902?, mostly lost)
- The Rainbow (1914)
- Skit for Danbury Fair (1909, inc.)
- Take-Off No. 7: Mike Donlin–Johnny Evers (1907, inc.)
- Take-Off No. 8: Willy Keeler at Bat (1907, inc.)
- Tone Roads et al. (1915?)
  - Tone Roads No. 1 (1911)
  - Tone Roads No. 2 (1915?, lost)
  - Tone Roads No. 3 (1915)
- The Unanswered Question (1908, rev. 1935)
- Yale–Princeton Football Game (1899, inc.)

== Band ==
- Fantasia on Jerusalem the Golden (1888)
- March in F and C, with Omega Lambda Chi (1896)
- March Intercollegiate, with Annie Lisle (1892)
- Runaway Horse on Main Street (1908, inc.)
- Schoolboy March in D and F, Op. 1 (1886, mostly lost)

== Chamber/Instrumental ==
String quartet

- String Quartet No. 1: From the Salvation Army (1900)
- String Quartet No. 2 (1913)

Violin sonata

- Pre-First Sonata for Violin and Piano (1913)
- Violin Sonata No. 1 (1903-1908)
- Violin Sonata No. 2 (1917?)
- Violin Sonata No. 3 (1905-1914)
- Violin Sonata No. 4: Children's Day at the Camp Meeting (1916)

Other

- Decoration Day (1919)
- From the Steeples and the Mountains (1901)
- Fugue in B-flat (1895?, inc.)
- Fugue in D (1895?, mostly lost)
- Fugue in Four Greek Modes (1897, inc.)
- Fugue in Four Keys on The Shining Shore (1903?, inc.)
- Hymn: Largo cantabile, from A Set of Three Short Pieces (1904)
- Hallowe'en (1914)
- In Re Con Moto et al. (1916), for violin, viola, bass, and piano, world premiere given in February 1966 at Carnegie Hall
- Largo for Violin and Piano (1901)
- Largo for Violin, Clarinet, and Piano (1934? arrangement of Largo for violin and piano)
- Largo Risoluto No. 1 (1909)
- Largo Risoluto No. 2 (1910)
- An Old Song Deranged (1903)
- Piece in G for String Quartet (1891?)
- Polonaise (1887, inc.)
- Practice for String Quartet in Holding Your Own! (1903)
- Prelude on Eventide (1908)
- Scherzo: All the Way Around and Back (1908)
- Scherzo: Over the Pavements (1910)
- Scherzo for String Quartet (1904)
- A Set of Three Short Pieces (1935?)
- Take-Off No. 3: Rube Trying to Walk 2 to 3!! (1909)
- Trio for Violin, Violoncello, and Piano (1907, rev. 1915)

== Keyboard ==
=== Works for piano ===
Sonatas

- Three Page Sonata (1905)
- Piano Sonata No. 1 (1909)
- Piano Sonata No. 2 (Concord) (1915)

Studies

- 27 Studies for piano, 8 lost
  - Study No. 1: Allegro (incomplete)
  - Study No. 2: Andante moderato–Allegro molto (Varied Air and Variations)
  - Study No. 3: (lost)
  - Study No. 4: Allegro moderato (incomplete)
  - Study No. 5: Moderato con anima
  - Study No. 6: Andante (1907–1909)
  - Study No. 7: Andante cantabile (1907)
  - Study No. 8: Trio (Allegro moderato–Presto) (1907)
  - Study No. 9: The Anti-Abolitionist Riots in the 1830s and 1840s
  - Study No. 10 (mostly lost)
  - Study No. 11: Andante (incomplete)
  - Study No. 12: (lost)
  - Study No. 13: (lost)
  - Study No. 14: (lost)
  - Study No. 15: Allegro moderato (incomplete) (1907–1909; 1920s)
  - Study No. 16: Andante cantabile (incomplete) (1907–1909; 1920s)
  - Study No. 17: (lost)
  - Study No. 18: Sunrise Cadenza (Adagio) (incomplete)
  - Study No. 19 (incomplete) (1907–1909; 1920s)
  - Study No. 20: March (Slow allegro or Fast andante) (1910, 1920s)
  - Study No. 21: Some Southpaw Pitching (1918–19)
  - Study No. 22: Andante maestoso–Allegro vivace (1909)
  - Study No. 23: Allegro (1912–1914; 1920s)
  - Study No. 24: (lost)
  - Study No. 25: (lost)
  - Study No. 26: (lost)
  - Study No. 27: Chromâtimelôdtune (incomplete)

Marches

- March No. 1 for Piano, with "Year of Jubilee" (c. 1894–95)
- March No. 2 for Piano, with "Son of a Gambolier" [inc.] (1895)
- March No. 3 for Piano, with "Omega Lambda Chi" (c. 1895–96)
- March No. 5 for Piano, with "Annie Lisle" (c. 1895)
- March No. 6 for Piano, with "Here's to Good Old Yale" (c. 1895–96)
- March in G and C for Piano, with "See the Conquering Hero Comes" (1896–7)
- March for Piano: The Circus Band (c. 1898–99)

Other works

- The Celestial Railroad (c. 1922–25)
- Three Improvisations (1938)
- Invention in D (c. 1898)
- Minuetto, Op. 4 (1886)
- New Year's Dance (1887)
- Piece in G Minor
- Set of Five Take-Offs (c. 1909)
- Four Transcriptions from "Emerson" (c. 1923–27)
- Varied Air and Variations (1920–22)
- Waltz–Rondo (1911)

Two pianos

- Burlesque Storm
- Drum Corps or Scuffle [mostly lost]
- Three Quarter-Tone Pieces
- Ragtime Dances for Two Pianos

=== Works for organ ===
- Adagio in F
- "Adeste Fideles" in an Organ Prelude (c. 1903)
- Burlesque Postlude in B
- Burlesque Postlude in C
- Canzonetta in F (c. 1893–94)
- Fugue in C Minor (c. 1898)
- Fugue in E (c. 1898)
- Interludes for Hymns (1898–1901)
- Melody in E
- Postlude for Thanksgiving Service [mostly lost]
- Variations on "America", for organ (1891) (arranged for orchestra by William Schuman and also arranged for piano solo by Lowell Liebermann)
- Voluntary in C Minor
- Voluntary in F

== Vocal ==
=== Songs ===
Title	(Incipit)	in 114 Songs	Collections	Words	Comments
Abide with me
Aeschylus and Sophocles			19 Songs		
Afterglow	At the quite close	39		James Fenimore Cooper Jr.	
Allegro	By morning's brightest beam	95		H. or Ch. Ives	
The All-Enduring
Amphion (from "Amphion")	The mountain stirred	106		Tennyson	
Ann Street	Quaint name…	25		Maurice Morris	
At Parting
At Sea	Some things are undivined	4		R. U. Johnson	
At the River	Shall we gather			Robert Lowry	arr. from Violin Sonata 4
Atalanta
August	For August, be your dwelling	35		D. G. Rossetti, after San Geminiano	
Autumn [II]	Earth rests	60		H. or Ch. Ives	
Because of You
Because Thou Art
Berceuse	O're the mountain	93		H. or Ch. Ives	
The Cage	A leopard went around	64		H. or Ch. Ives	
The Camp Meeting	Across the summer meadows	47		Charlotte Elliot	from Symphony No. 3
Canon [I]	Oh, the days are gone	111	19 Songs	Moore	
Canon [II]
Chanson de Florian	Ah! s'il est dans votre village	78		Claris de Florian	
Charlie Rutlage	Another good cowpuncher	10		Cowboy Songs	
The Children's Hour, from	Between the dark	74		Longfellow	
A Christmas Carol	Little town of Bethlehem	100	19 Songs	"traditional"	
The Circus Band	All summer long	56		H. or Ch. Ives	
The Collection	Now help us, Lord	38		"stanzas from old hymns"	
The Coming of the Day
Country Celestial
Cradle Song	Hush thee	33	19 Songs	A. L. Ives	
December	Last, for December	37		D. G. Rossetti, after San Geminiano	
Disclosure	Thoughts, which deeply rest	7		Ch. or H. Ives	
Down East	Songs! Visions of my home	55		Ives	
Dream Sweetly
Dreams	When twilight comes	85		Porteous	German version?
Du alte Mutter / My dear old mother
Du bist wie eine Blume				Heinrich Heine	
Ein Ton / I hear a tone
Elégie	O doux printemps	77		Gallet	
The Ending Year
Evening	Now came still Evening	2		Milton	
Evidence	There comes o're the valley	58		Ives	
Far from my heav'nly home
Far in the wood
A Farewell to Land			19 Songs		
La Fède	La fede mai non debe	34	19 Songs	Ariosto	
Feldeinsamkeit / In Summer Fields	Ich ruhe still / Quite still I lie	82	19 Songs	Allmers (tr. Chapman)	
Flag Song
Forward into Light		99		Alford after St Bernard	from "The Celestial Country"
Friendship
Frühlingslied
General William Booth Enters into Heaven	Booth led boldly		19 Songs	Vachel Lindsay	
God Bless and Keep Thee
Grace
Grantchester	would I were in Grantchester	17		Rupert Brooke	
The Greatest Man	My teacher said	19		Anne Timoney Collins	
Gruss
Harpalus (An Ancient Pastoral)	Oh, Harpalus!	73		Thomas Percy	
He Is There!	Fifteen years ago	50		Ives	also a WW2 sequel
Her Eyes
Her gown was of vermilion silk
His Exaltation	For the grandeur	46		Robert Robinson	from Violin Sonata No. 2
The Housatonic at Stockbridge	Contented river!	15		R. U. Johnson	
Hymn	Thou hidden love	20		James George Walton after Tersteegen	quoted by O. W. Holmes
Hymn of Trust
I knew and loved a maid
I travelled among unknown men	I travelled among unknown men	75		Wordsworth	
Ich grolle nicht / I'll not complain		83		Heine	w/o English in 114
Ilmenau / Over all the treetops	Über allen Gipfeln/Over all the hilltops	68		Goethe (tr. Harmony Twitchell Ives)	
Immortality	Who dares to say	5			
In a mountain spring
In April-tide
In Autumn
In Flanders Fields	In Flanders Fields	49		McCrae	
In My Beloved's Eyes
In the Alley	On my way to work	53		Ives	
from the "Incantation"	When the moon	18		Byron	
Incomplete song [I]
Incomplete song [II]
The Indians	Alas! for them	14		Charles Sprague	
The Innate	Voices live in every finite being	40	19 Songs	Ives	
Kären	Do'st remember child!	91		unknown	
The Last Reader	I sometimes sit	3		O. W. Holmes	
The Light That Is Felt	A tender child	66		Whittier	
Like a Sick Eagle	The spirit is too weak	26		Keats	
Lincoln, the Great Commoner	And so he came	11		Edwin Markham	
Longing
Die Lotosblume / The Lotus Flower	Die Lotosblume ängstigt			Heine	see The South wind
The Love Song of Har Dyal
Luck and Work	While one will search	21		R. U. Johnson	
Majority	The Masses	1	19 Songs	Ch. Ives	
Maple Leaves	October turned my maple's leaves	23		Th. B. Aldrich	
Marie	Marie, I see thee	92		Gottschall	
Memories: a. Very Pleasant; b. Rather Sad	We're sitting in the opera house/ From the street a strain	102			
Minnelied
Mirage	The hope I dreamed of	70		Ives	
Mists [I]	Low lie the mists	57		Ives	
Mists [II]
My Lou Jennine
My Native Land [I]	My Native Land now meets my eye	101		Traditional	
My Native Land [II]				Farewell to land?	
My Task
Nature's Way	When the distant evening	61		Ives	
Naught that country needeth		98	Alford after St Bernard	from "The Celestial Country"	
The New River	Down the river	6		Ch. or H. Ives	
Night of Frost in May (from)	There was the lyre of earth	84	Meredith		
A Night Song	The young May moon	88		Moore	
A Night Thought	How oft a cloud	107		Moore	
No More
Nov. 2, 1920 (An Election)	It strikes me that	22	19 Songs (An Election)	Ch. Ives?	
An Old Flame	When dreams enfold me	87		Ives	
Old Home Day	Go my songs!	52		Ives	
The Old Mother/ Du alte Mutter	Du alte Mutter/My dear old mother	81		Cordier, after Vinje	set by Grieg "Du gamle Mor!"
Omens and Oracles	Phantoms of the future	86		'unknown' [ Robert Bulwer-Lytton ]	
On Judges' Walk
On the Antipodes			19 Songs		2 pianos & organ pedal
On the Counter	Tunes we heard	28		Ch. Ives?	
"1, 2, 3"
The One Way
The Only Son
Paracelsus (from)	For God is glorified	30	19 Songs	Browning	from latter part of sc. v
Peaks
A Perfect Day
Pictures
Premonitions	There's a shadow	24		R. U. Johnson	
Qu'il m'irait bien	Qu'il m'irait bien	76		Moreau Delano	
The Rainbow (So May It Be!)	My heart leaps up	8		Wordsworth	
Religion	There is no unbelief.	16		James T. Bixby	
Remembrance	The sound of a distant horn	12		Ch. Ives	untitled in 114; "The Pond" in orchestral version
Requiem		19 Songs			
Resolution	Walking stronger	13	19 Songs	Ch. or H. Ives	
Rock of Ages
Romanzo (di Central Park)	Grove, Rove, Night, Delight	96		parody, attr. Leigh Hunt	
Rosamunde (De la drama:)	J'attends, helas!	79		Bélanger	
Rosenzweige
Rough Wind	Rough wind that moanest loud	69		Shelley	
Runaway Horse on Main Street
A Scotch Lullaby
A Sea Dirge
The Sea of Sleep
The See'r	An old man	29		Ch.Ives?	
Sehnsucht
September	And in September	36		D. G. Rossetti, after San Geminiano	
Serenity	O Sabbath rest of [sic]	42		Whittier	
The Side Show	Is that Mister Riley	32		Ives	
Slow March (Inscribed to the Children's Faithful Friend)	One evening just at sunset	114		H. or Ch. Ives	after the dead march in Saul
Slugging a Vampire			19 Songs	Ives	see Tarrant Moss, replaced for copyright reasons
Smoke
Soliloquy
A Son of a Gambolier	Come join my humble ditty	54		Ives?	
Song
A Song—For Anything:	a. When the waves softly sigh; b. Yale, Farewell!; c. Hear My Prayer, O Lord	89			
Song for Harvest Season
The Song of the Dead [lost]
Song without words [I]
Song without words [II]
Song without words [III]
Songs my Mother Taught Me		108		Heyduk 'tr. adapted'	
The South Wind / Die Lotosblume	When gently blows	97		Ives, substituting Heine	
Spring Song	Across the hill of late	65		Ives	
The Sun shines hot
Sunrise
Swimmers (from the)	Then the swift plunge	27		Louis Untermeyer	
Tarrant Moss	I closed and drew	72		Kipling	see Sluggin a Vampire
Thee I Love
There is a certain garden
There is a lane	There is a lane	71		Ives	
They Are There!	There's a time in many a life			C.Ives	revised version of He is there! in 1917
The Things Our Fathers Loved	I think there must	43		Ives	
Thoreau	He grew in those seasons	48			from Piano Sonata 2
Those Evening Bells	Those Evening Bells!	63		Moore	
Through Night and Day
To Edith	So like a flower	112		Ives	new words?
Tolerance	How can I turn	59		Pres. Hadley (actually Kipling)	
Tom Sails Away	Scenes from my childhood	51	19 Songs	Ives	
Two Little Flowers	On sunny days in our backyard	104	19 Songs	H. or Ch. Ives	
Two Slants (Christian and Pagan): a. Duty; b. Vita		9 a&b			
Vote for Names! Names! Names!
The Waiting Soul	Breathe from the gentle South	62		Cowper [??]	
Walking	A big October morning	67		Ives	
Walt Whitman	Who goes there?	31		Walt Whitman	from LoG stanza 20
Waltz	Round and round	109		Ives	
Watchman!	Watchman, tell us	44		John Bowring	from Violin Sonata 2
Watchman! [II]
Weil' auf mir / Eyes so dark	Weil auf mir/Eyes so dark	80		Lenau/Westbrook	
West London	Crouch'd on the pavement	105		Matthew Arnold	
When stars are in the quiet skies	When stars are in the quiet skies	113		Bulwer-Lytton	
Where the eagle cannot see		94		Monica Peveril Turnbull	
The White Gulls (from the Russian)	The White Gulls dip and wheel	103		Maurice Morris	
Who knows the light
Widmung
Wie Melodien zieht es mir
Wiegenlied
William Will
The World's Highway	For long I wander'd happily	90		H. or Ch. Ives	
The World's Wanderers	Tell me, star	110		Shelley	
Yellow Leaves

=== Choral works ===
Multi-movement sacred works

- The Celestial Country (1898–1902)
- Communion Service (c. 1894)
- Three Harvest Home Chorales (c. 1902, c. 1912–15)

Psalms

- Psalm 14 (1902, 1912–13)
- Psalm 24 (1901, 1912–13)
- Psalm 25 (1901, 1912–13)
- Psalm 42 (1891–92)
- Psalm 54 (1902)
- Psalm 67 (1898–99)
- Psalm 90 (1923–24)
- Psalm 100 (1902)
- Psalm 135 (1902, 1912–13)
- Psalm 150 (1898–99)

Other sacred works

- All-Forgiving, look on me
- Anthem: With Hearts Rejoicing Ever
- Be Thou, O God, Exalted High
- Benedictus in E
- Benedictus in G
- Bread of the World
- Nine Canticle Phrases
- Chant, Op. 2, No. 2
- Crossing the Bar
- Easter Anthem
- Easter Carol
- Gloria in excelsis
- Hymn, Op. 2, No. 1
- I Come to Thee
- I Think of Thee, My God
- Kyrie
- Life of the World
- The Light That Is Felt
- Lord God, Thy Sea Is Mighty
- O God, My Heart Is Fixed
- Processsional: Let There Be Light
- Serenity [mostly lost]
- Turn Ye, Turn Ye

Secular chorus with instrumental ensemble

- December
- An Election
- General William Booth Enters into Heaven
- He Is There!
- Johnny Poe
- Lincoln, the Great Commoner
- The Masses (Majority)
- The New River
- Sneak Thief
- They Are There! (A War Song March)
- Two Slants (Christian and Pagan)
- Walt Whitman

Partsongs

- Age of Gold
- The Bells of Yale
- The Boys in Blue
- For You and Me!
- My Sweet Jeanette
- O Maiden Fair
- Partsong in A
- Partsong in B
- Partsong in E
- Serenade
- A Song of Mory's
- The Year's at the Spring

== Ballets to the music of Charles Ives ==
- Ives, Songs
- Ivesiana
- The Unanswered Question
