= The Unanswered Ives =

- DVD cover
- Also known as: The Unanswered Ives - American Pioneer of Music
- Genre: Documentary
- Created by: Anne-Kathrin Peitz
- Developed by: Accentus Music/WDR
- Written by: Anne-Kathrin Peitz
- Directed by: Anne-Kathrin Peitz
- Creative director: Anne-Kathrin Peitz
- Presented by: Arte
- Starring: John Adams; Jack Cooper; James Sinclair; Jan Swafford
- Country of origin: Germany
- Original languages: English; German

Production
- Executive producer: Paul Smaczny
- Producer: Maria Stodtmeier
- Production locations: Berlin, Germany; Leipzig, Germany; New York, N.Y. Danbury, Connecticut; New Haven, Connecticut
- Cinematography: Mitja Hagelüken
- Editor: Dirk Seliger
- Camera setup: Ulf Wogenstein, Christoph Wonneberger (sound)
- Running time: 54 minutes
- Production companies: Accentus Music GmbH; Arte [de/fr] WDR - Westdeutscher Rundfunk [de] Mitteldeutsche Medienförderung

Original release
- Network: WDR, Arte
- Release: September 22, 2019

The Unanswered Ives is an hour-long documentary about the life and musical career of the American composer Charles Ives. Written and directed by German film maker Anne-Kathrin Peitz, the documentary features Ives' early years in Danbury, CT, his musical relationship with his father, education at Yale and later career as insurance executive and composer. The documentary was commissioned by and produced for Arte and WDR television for broadcast and later distributed as part of a double DVD set. Notably, the production received the Czech Crystal – “Documentary Programmes Dedicated to Music, Dance and Theatre” at the Golden Prague International Television Festival.

== Background ==
After numerous successful collaborations on music documentaries between Accentus Music, WDR (Westdeutscher Rundfunk) and Arte T.V., an agreement was signed in 2017 to complete a definitive documentary on American composer Charles Ives. The idea was generated by award-winning film director Anne-Kathrin Peitz and backed by Accentus Music owner Paul Smaczny. In January 2018 the Mitteldeutsche Medienförderung awarded Accentus Music €140,000 to proceed with the production of the documentary.

== Production and documentary ==
Most of the Peitz' on-location cinematography in the New England region was completed in late spring of 2018. Part of the exterior filming was hampered by four tornadoes on May 15, 2018.

Live filming was completed on June 1, 2018 in Berlin, Germany at the Hochschule der populären Künste recording studio. Editing and final credits were completed at the end of September 2018 in Leipzig, Germany. Post-production color processing was completed at Trickkiste Studios.

== Premieres, presentations and distribution ==
The first showing of The Unanswered Ives was on the campus of the University of North Carolina, Chapel Hill on October 13, 2018. This was in conjunction the North Carolina Repertory Jazz Orchestra concert playing the music of the Mists: Charles Ives for Jazz Orchestra album.

The documentary received its first European preview on April 9, 2019 in Mannheim, Germany at the Popakademie Baden-Württemberg during the 15th edition of the International Forum for Music, ‘’The Look of Sound’’. Arte Television’s official premiere and initial broadcast of The Unanswered Ives documentary was through the ARD network on Saturday, September 22, 2019 (11:20 p.m. – 12:15 a.m. programming slot, CET) and was re-broadcast on Sunday, September 29 at 9:20 a.m. The classical and archival music station SWR2 in Baden-Württemberg, Germany broadcast an extensive 6 minute segment on the Südwestrundfunk Meeting Point Classic show about the combined DVD: Universe, Incomplete/The Unanswered Ives.

Other European and Middle Eastern film festivals The Unanswered Ives was presented on include the Projection Music’Arte and the Golden Prague International Film Festival where it received the Czech Crystal – “Documentary Programmes Dedicated to Music, Dance and Theatre”. The documentary was entered into and shown at 5th Beirut Art Film Festival (BAFF) in Lebanon, held at the American University of Beirut. The film was shown on December 11, 2020.

The DVD of The Unanswered Ives was released by Accentus Music for purchase in November 2019 as part of a two DVD set, Charles Ives – UNIVERSE, INCOMPLETE//THE UNANSWERED IVES. The first DVD, UNIVERSE, INCOMPLETE, is a live production directed by Christoph Marthaler, music conducted by Titus Engel with stage design by Anna Viebrock. They developed a highly individual take on Ives' unfinished project: the Universe Symphony. The second CD is Anne-Kathrin Peitz production: The Unanswered Ives.

== Critical reception and professional ratings ==
"The small-town environment of (Ives) childhood and youth are well-conjured up though (sic) and there’s an impressive roll-call of experts, who don’t outstay their welcome. The interwoven performances are straightforwardly presented"

Martin Cotton, BBC Music Magazine

"...A solid Ives documentary completes this outstanding publication..."

Juan Martin Koch, Neue Musikzeitung (translated)

"...The Unanswered Ives...give in brief sketches a friendly but not exaggerated look at this enfant terrible of the US American music scene."

Uwe Krusch, Pizzicato (translated)
