= Peter Thoegersen =

American musician

Peter Alexander Thoegersen (b. June 29, 1967) is an American composer, author, music theorist and drummer best known as a theorist and practitioner of a variety of music called polytempic polymicrotonality.

== Early life ==
Thoegersen was born in Los Angeles, California. He earned a doctorate in music composition from the University of Illinois in 2012, writing his dissertation on the subject of polytempic polymicrotonality, with only a single precursor in the literature, the Universe Symphony (1915) of Charles Ives.

== Style ==
Composer Kyle Gann provides a detailed introduction to Thoegersen's practice in his liner notes to the CD Three Pieces in Polytempic Polymicrotonality on New World Records. He begins by saying that he has spent a lifetime explaining radical music and calls the music on the disc the most radical he's ever written about. He says, radically, Thoegersen has musical layers simultaneously moving in different tempos, plus, even moreso, in different microtonal scales playing at the same time. Nevertheless, Gann contrasts the resulting "fervent and heterogeneous multidimensionality" with an emergent level of charm and simplicity that belies the initial impression.

Gann has it from Thoegersen himself that Thoegersen begins composing by working out rhythms with his hands and feet and that Thoegersen thinks of pitch as of coloring the rhythmic skeleton. Thoegersen, Gann says, is "not ideologically committed to either the dissonant or consonant end of the tonal spectrum." Gann says Thoegersen avoids "the long-overworked duality of tonal vs. atonal" and thinks about pitch in terms of centricity, namely using certain pitches as anchor points and stacking similar intervals around them in both directions.

He likens the overall effect "to a carefully composed environmental recording." Gann does make it clear that the details matter, specifically the relationships between the chosen simultaneous tempi and the simultaneous microtonal tunings in any particular Thoegersen composition; readers interested in the details of Gann's analysis should seek out his notes.

Gann in the liner notes also states that "...by going further than anyone else has gone in terms of this particularly American concept of fusing the polytempic with the polymicrotonal--extending and combining the conceptual worlds of Ives, Nancarrow, Partch, Carter and even Frank Zappa, he (Thoegersen) has created a special place for himself within American music."

== Reception ==
Thoegersen's monograph "Polytempic Polymicrotonal Music" stands now as the basic reference for this compositional tactic. Polytempic polymicrotonal ensemble music moves simultaneously in multiple independent tempi and sounds simultaneously in multiple independent intonational systems (whether equal temperaments or just intonational systems). The monograph both guides contemporary composers into this novel approach and practice (which can accommodate multiple styles), and establishes diverse historical precedents reaching back to Ancient Greece (in particular Aristoxenus of Tarentum), the Middle Ages (in particular Boethius), the Renaissance (Gioseffo Zarlino and Nicola Vicentino) and many 20th century composers, especially Charles Ives and Jean-Etienne Marie. Thoegersen singles out Ives's Universe Symphony as the first fully polytempic polymicrotonal work. Thoegersen's analysis of the ratio relationships between the three orchestras that constitute the Universe Symphony, is cited by Johnny Reinhard.

Thoegersen has composed many works exploring polytempic polymicrotonality. Reviewing Thoegersen's CD: Milko. Irrational Quartet. Herniated Lumbar Discs Much Better Now, New World (with notes by Kyle Gann), Robert Carl notes that this music is "unlike almost anything you've ever heard. Readers take note, and hardy souls may respond" and suggests bringing "a laser-like and microscopic intensity to one's listening." Carl cites Elliott Carter, Pierre Boulez and Milton Babbitt as composers from a previous generation whose music had a similar feeling of "pure research", a fresh sound emerging from a fresh method.

Writing on Thoegersen's song cycle "Facebook: What's On Your Mind? 2016 - 2020", Gerard Pape says "Thoegersen's work exists at an intersection of freedoms: musical and social, where one might at once sound the musical limit of free sound and the social limit of «free speech. His work is both courageous and dangerous to academia. No easy categories for this music. We are in the no-man's land of unlimited freedom far from job security and clear social status."

== Personal life ==
Thoegersen lives in Urbana, Illinois.

== List of works in score form ==
Thoegersen freely distributes his scores via the Internet Archive. Scores for all the works below are available there. Dates indicate composition.

=== Drumset ===
- 3:4:5:7, for Solo drumset #1 (1995)
- Solo for Drumset #2 (2022)
- Solo for Drumset #3 (2022)
- Solo for Drumset #4 (2022)
- Solo for Drumset #5 (2022)
- Solo for Drumset VI (2022)
- STSOMA Drumsolo #7 (2022)
- solo for drumset #8 (2022)
- Solo for Drumset #9 (2022)
- Solo for Drumset X: polymixtures (2022)
- Drumset solo #11 (2022)

=== Vocals and other instruments ===
- Always Sleeping (2006)
- Facebook Song Cycle: What's on your mind (2017)

=== Solo works ===
- Dreams Like Little Movies, for solo bassoon (2016)
- I Am A Force Of Nature, for solo trombone (2018)
- Jove Defeats Saturn, polymicrotonal saxophone solo (2011)
- May The Force Be With You, solo bass trombone (2017)
- Vibes Solo (2020)
- Vibraphone Solo 1b (2020)
- Solo for C Flute in Polymicrotonality (2018)
- Solo for Bb Clarinet (2002)
- Sit Down and Shut Up, for microtonal Horn in F (2011)
- Solo for Oboe: polymicrotonal modulations around a 12tet framework (2019)
- Trumpet Solo in Bb: Polymicrotonal modulations (2019)
- Solo for Contrabass Clarinet in Bb at the 8th tone (2024)

=== Duos ===
- Duo for Drumset and Piano in Polymeter (2022)
- Duo for Harp and Percussion in Polytempic Polymicrotonality (2019)
- Harp part for Duo for Harp and Percussion (2019)
- Masterdangler, for bassoon and guitar (2017)
- Music for 13tet Microtonal Flute and Drumset in Polytempo (2022)
- Music for Drumset and 22tet Microtonal Cello in Polymeter/polytempo (2022)
- Rondo: duet for two saxophones (1997)
- Saturn Eats His Child, for piano and saxophone (2007)
- PolyReinosaurus Rex, for bassoon and drumset (2016)
- Summer in Helsinki, microtonal duo for bassoon and violin (2017)
- Skullen a Coldie at the Servo w/M8ts, for two Bb Horns in Polytempic Polymicrotonality (2020)
- sub specie aeternitatis, for two vibraphones (2020)

=== Trios ===
- Wind Trio in Polymicrotonality (2023)
- Suite For Clarinet, Cello, and Drumset (2002)

=== Quartets ===
- Polymicrotonal Etude XVII, for mixed quartet (2024)

=== Percussion ensemble ===
- Percussion Series II: The wrath of the "Connies" (2019)
- there's nothing that can't be done, for percussion quartet (2005)

=== Quintets ===
- Andante Democratico, for flute, bassoon, drumset, Horn in F and C Trumpet (2002)
- Brass Quintet #1 (2001)
- Harmiklot's Revenge, for Woodwind Quintet (2005)
- Mixed Quintet #2, for Piano, viola, Harp, Guitar, and Marimba (2024)

=== Large chamber ensembles ===
- F 5 (standard tuning) (2005)
- Milko (polytempic polymicrotonal) (2013)
- Two Worlds: quartertone quintets in conversation (2003)

=== Electroacoustics and acousmatics ===
- Gorgeous Monstrosity (2005)
- Drums Of War (2005)

=== Piano ===
- Piano Collection I: #1-4 (1999)
- Piano Collection 2 (2002)
- Piano Collection 3 (2010)
- Piano Collection 4 (2016)
- Piano Collection 5 (2016)
- Piano Collection VI: Mikrokomplexmos (2016)
- Piano Collection VII (2016)
- Piano Collection 8 (2016)
- Piano Collection IX: 'Ten Finger' (2017)
- Piano Collection X: "Singularity" (2017)
- Piano Collection XI: "Ewe" (2017)
- Piano Collection XII (2017)
- Piano Collection XIII: Ode to Henry Cowell (2017)
- Piano Collection XIV (2017)
- Piano Collection 15a : I can't walk... (2017)
- Piano Collection XV: "Herniated Lumbar Disks" (2018)
- Piano Collection 16: in treatment (2019)
- Piano Collection 17 a-f (2020)
- Piano Collection 18: gratis mutandis (2022)
- Piano Collection 19: quod libet (2022)
- Piano Collection XX: "your interpretation" (2023)
- Piano Collection XXI: new beginning (2024)
- Piano Collection 22: Maximus (2024)
- Piano Collection 23: Maximus Part Deux (2024)

=== String Quartets ===
- String Quartet #1 (1999-2022)
- String Quartet #2: Hypercube, for Polytempic Polymicrotonal Strings (2012)
- String Quartet #3 (2013)
- String Quartet IV: Irrational Quartet (2018)
- String Quartet V (2018)
- String Quartet VI (2018)
- String Quartet VII: two-bow quartet (2019)
- String Quartet VIII: post post post structuralist (2019)
- String Quartet #9: Fractured Consciousness (2019)
- String Quartet X: irrational quartet ii (2019)
- String Quartet XI: 7 C's (2019)
- String Quartet XII: BIG BAD MOTHER FUCKER FROM OUTER SPACE (2019)
- String Quartet xiii: poly-just intonation quartet (2019)
- String Quartet #14: "armageddonouttahere" (2019)
- String Quartet XV, in three movements (2020)
- String Quartet XVa: It Is Now; a polymicrotonal quartet in monody (alternate version) (2019)
- String Quartet #16: COVID-19, the world pandemic (2020)
- String Quartet #17 in Polytempic Polymicrotonality (2025-26)

=== Symphonies ===
- Symphony I in Polytempic Polymicrotonality (2023)
- Symphony II: five short pieces for polytempic polymicrotonal orchestra (2013)
- Symphony III IN FULL POLYTEMPIC POLYMICROTONALITY IN FOUR MOVEMENTS (2024)
- Symphony IV in Polytempic Polymicrotonality: melodiae perpetuae (2025)
- Symphony V in Polytempic Polymicrotonality (in progress, 2026)

== Discography ==
- "Three Pieces in Polytempic Polymicrotonality" / New World Records, 80812-2; New World Records, 2019
- "Alien Music" / Magic and Unique Music Publishing, 2022
- "Facebook: What's On Your Mind? 2016 - 2020", 2021, Flea Label
- "Polytempic Polymicrotonal Music in Four Pieces" 2024, Fragments of Blue label, Bandcamp
- "Harmiklot: an American Tragedy" 2024, Fragments of Blue label, Bandcamp
- "Soliloquy in Monopolymicrotonality" Compilation Album 2019, George Christian, Bandcamp compilation album
- "The Legend of Zip Caustic: how I became a failure" Acts I-IV, 2025, Fragments of Blue label, Bandcamp

== Bibliography ==
- Polytempic Polymicrotonal Music / Jenny Stanford Publishing, Peter Thoegersen, (2022)
- Maqam Melodies : Pitches, Patterns, and Developments of Music in the Middle East and other Microtonal Writings / Jenny Stanford Publishing, Peter Thoegersen, (released August 7th, 2024)
