= Peitz (disambiguation) =

Peitz is a town in Brandenburg, Germany.

Peitz may also refer to:

== People ==
- Anne-Kathrin Peitz (born 1972), German film director and producer
- Dominic Peitz (born 1984), German footballer
- Heinie Peitz (1870–1943), American baseball player
- Joe Peitz (1869–1919), American baseball player

== Other uses ==
- Peitz 101, French aircraft
