= The Gong on the Hook and Ladder =

Composition by Charles Ives

The Gong on the Hook and Ladder or Firemen's Parade on Main Street
- by Charles Ives
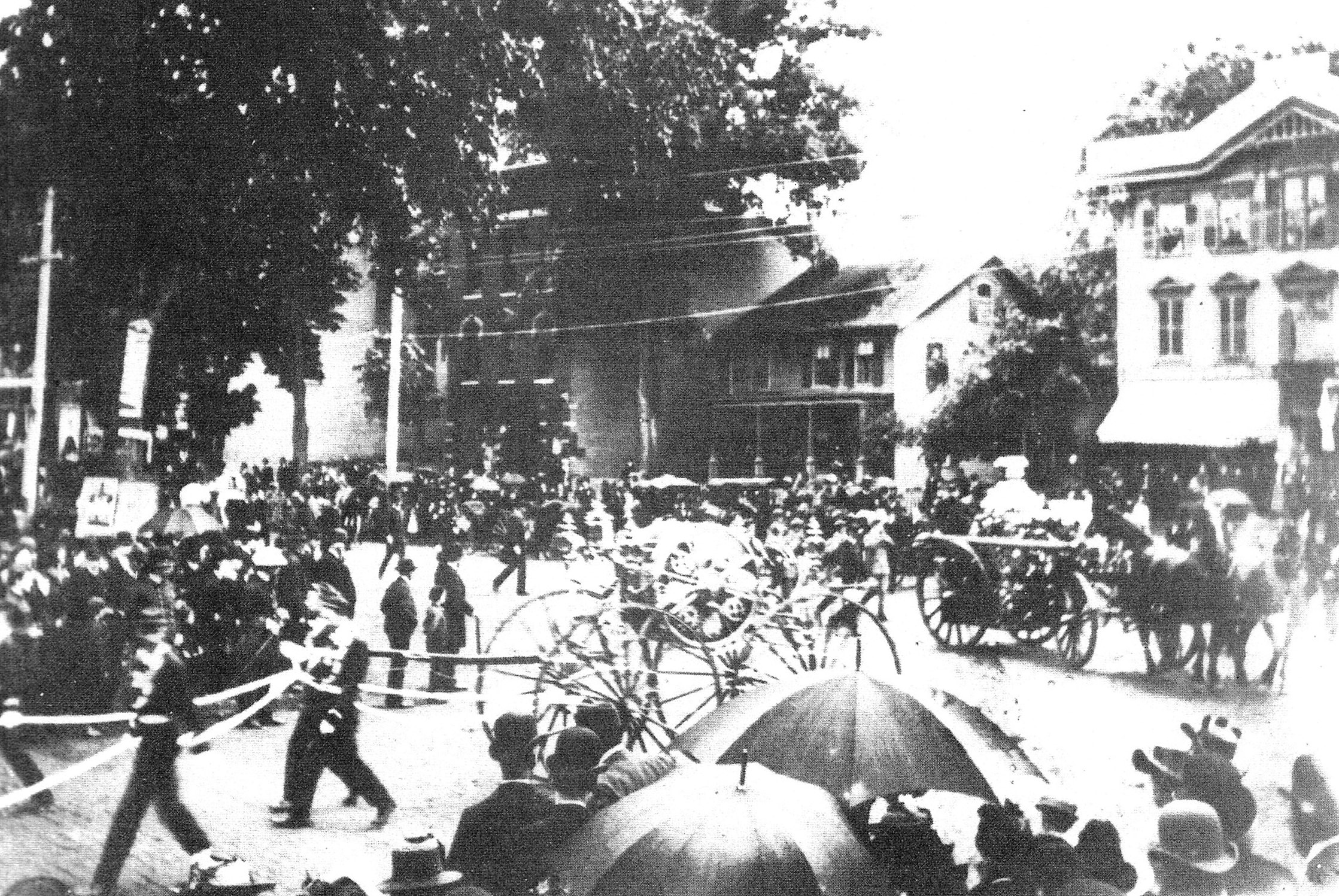
- Firemen on parade in the 1890s. Photograph used in the score cover.
- Composed: Piano quintet version: Probably 1911; Chamber orchestra version: unknown, probably c. 1934
- Performed: April 22, 1934 - New York City
- Published: 1960:
- Scoring: Piano quintet (1911); Chamber orchestra (1934)

The Gong on the Hook and Ladder or Firemen's Parade on Main Street, normally shortened as The Gong on the Hook and Ladder and also initially entitled Allegro moderato, is a short composition by American composer Charles Ives.

== Background ==
This piece was first composed in a very early form as a section in Charles Ives's Pre-Second String Quartet, (Note: Ives's second string quartet is a completely different composition that was composed some time later.) a work that he composed between 1904 and 1906, but later discarded and destroyed. Ives described the piece as a series of short movements, the material of which would later be used in other pieces, such as Hymn, Hallowe'en or The Gong on the Hook and Ladder. In the period between 1906 and 1916, Ives formed a professional partnership with his friend and business colleague, Julian S. Myrick, to start what eventually developed into a highly successful insurance company and married Harmony Twichell, thus moving out of "Poverty Flat", a bachelor's apartment that he shared with his friends at Yale University where he tried out different rhythms and harmonies at the piano. It was in this decade that he devoted his time and energy to business and composition; it was the most musically prolific decade of his life.

Originally written for strings and piano, this composition was probably composed circa 1911, from fragments written for the Pre-Second String Quartet as early as 1905. The piece was later arranged for chamber orchestra. Even though the date of the orchestration is unknown and the holograph of that version is presumed to be lost, Ives's fair copy of the work allowed him to premiere it at the Alvin Theater, in New York City, on April 22, 1934. This performance took place in a concert of music and dance organized by Martha Graham and her group and sponsored by the Pan American Association of Composers. Alfred Stoessel conducted the piece with a pick-up chamber orchestra. The Ives works performed on this occasion also included The Pond and Hallowe'en, all being premiered as an instrumental interlude.

The work was first published many years later, in July 1953, under the erroneous title Calcium Light. (Note: Calcium Light Music is a different composition altogether and is in no way related to The Gong on the Hook and Ladder.) It was published without Ives's authorization in Henry Cowell's New Music Quarterly series, Vol. 24, No. 4. The correct title was reinstated when the work was published in 1960 by Peermusic, with corrections from 1979. The second public performance of this composition took place in an all-Ives Young People's concert on January 22, 1967, at Lincoln Center's Philharmonic Hall, in New York City. Leonard Bernstein, who also championed Ives's work, premiered what Howard Klein with The New York Times later entitled "[The Gong on the Hook and Ladder's] first concert performance" with the New York Philharmonic. The piece was first recorded by these musicians just ten days later, on January 31, 1967. This piece was included as the third movement of the composer's Set of Three Pieces for Small Orchestra. However, these groupings were primarily made for performance and the individual pieces from the set are not related.

== Structure ==
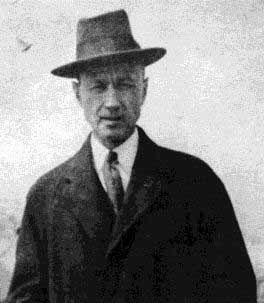
The composer in 1913

The Gong on the Hook and Ladder was first conceived as a small chamber composition scored for first and second violin, viola, cello, piano, optional double bass, and optional gong, bell or drum. The revised orchestrated version premiered in 1934, however, is scored for a chamber orchestra, consisting of a flute, a B-flat clarinet, a bassoon, a first and second B-flat trumpet, a trombone, timpani, an optional gong, a snare drum, a triangle, a piano and a small string section, consisting of three first violins, three second violins, two violas, two cellos, and two double basses. Both versions have an approximate duration of 2 to 3 minutes, the latter being 35 bars long. It is marked Allegro moderato in the score, later reaching Allegro vivace, only to come back to Tempo primo in the last five bars.

=== Analysis ===
It is in 7/8, though time subdivision is not clear because of the multiple irregular beats performed by the musicians. Many different rhythm elements take place in a performance of this piece. This piece is well-known for juxtaposing non-tonal and tonal rhythms, which attempt to resemble the sounds produced during a parade by a marching band while the engine of a fire truck speeds up or slows down. In the case of the chamber orchestra version, the rhythm in the first 21 bars can be broken down into these parts:

- The gong strikes once in each 7/8 measure throughout the whole piece, while the snare drum plays the same rhythm striking twice (two double-dotted quarter notes in each bar) and the timpani executes a roll from f decreasing to pp in each bar. The gong is only meant to be played in case the ensemble is large.
- The bassoon, bowed cello and pizzicato bass keep rhythmically synchronized with the triangle, which is meant to strike in expanding and contracting patterns: first, two events in the first bar, then three events in the second, then four in the third, etc. The series follows this pattern: 2, 3, 4, 5, 6, 5, 4, 3, 2, 3, 4, 5, 6, 7, 6, 5, 4, 3, 2, 3, and 4.
- The piano plays two large whole-tone chords, the one on the left hand being built on C and the one on the right hand on C-sharp. Incidentally, these two highly dissonant chords are the first two notes on the cello, bass, and bassoon line. From the third bar onwards, the piano also plays a second sound event per bar, which consists of double octaves that have slight alterations in the three lower notes.
- The trumpets, the trombone, the clarinet, and the flute all play different melodic themes in four different keys.

From bar 21 onwards, at the Allegro vivace mark, the piece slightly changes and becomes more agitated: the strings play tremolos; the piano plays fast, high-pitched chords; the melodic themes played by most instruments change, etc. The tempo changes to 7/4 at the climax in bar 29, only to go back to Tempo primo in bar 31, decrescendo and ritardando until the end of the piece.

A highly experimental work, The Gong on the Hook and Ladder famously quotes three different melodies: first, Oh My Darling, Clementine, played by the flute in bar 12 and the violin at the end of the piece in bar 32; then, a Psi Upsilon marching song from Yale entitled Few Days, played by the trumpet in bar 19; finally, Marching through Georgia is also played by the trumpet in bar 27.

== Recordings ==
=== Piano quintet version ===
- Violinists Eva Gruesser and Mia Wu, violist Rachel Evans, cellist Beverly Lauridsen and pianist Joel Sachs recorded the piece under Naxos. The recording, initially released by the Musical Heritage Society in 1988 on LP, was taken at the Middle Tennessee State University, in Murfreesboro, Tennessee, in September 1987, and was released on compact disc much later, in March 2005.

=== Chamber orchestra version ===
- Leonard Bernstein conducted the world premiere recording on January 31, 1967 with the New York Philharmonic.
- Bernstein and the New York Philharmonic recorded a live performance of this composition again in November 1988. The recording was taken at the Avery Fisher Hall in New York City and was released by Deutsche Grammophon on compact disc in 1990 and re-released in 2004, 2013, and 2018.
- Conductor Ingo Metzmacher also recorded the piece with the Ensemble Modern under EMI Classics. The performance was recorded at the Saal der Deutschen Bank in Frankfurt, between December 2 and 6, 1991. The recording was made available on compact disc in 1992 and re-released in 2008,
- Accentus Music released an all-Ives double DVD in Germany. This release consisted of two films, the first of which was Universe, Incomplete, which included The Gong on the Hook and Ladder. The two-hour feature was a stage production of Ruhrtriennale 2018, which was filmed at the Jahrhunderthalle, in Bochum, and was premiered on August 17, 2018. The DVD was released in 2019.
