= Overture in G minor (Ives) =

Unfinished composition by Charles Ives

- by Charles Ives
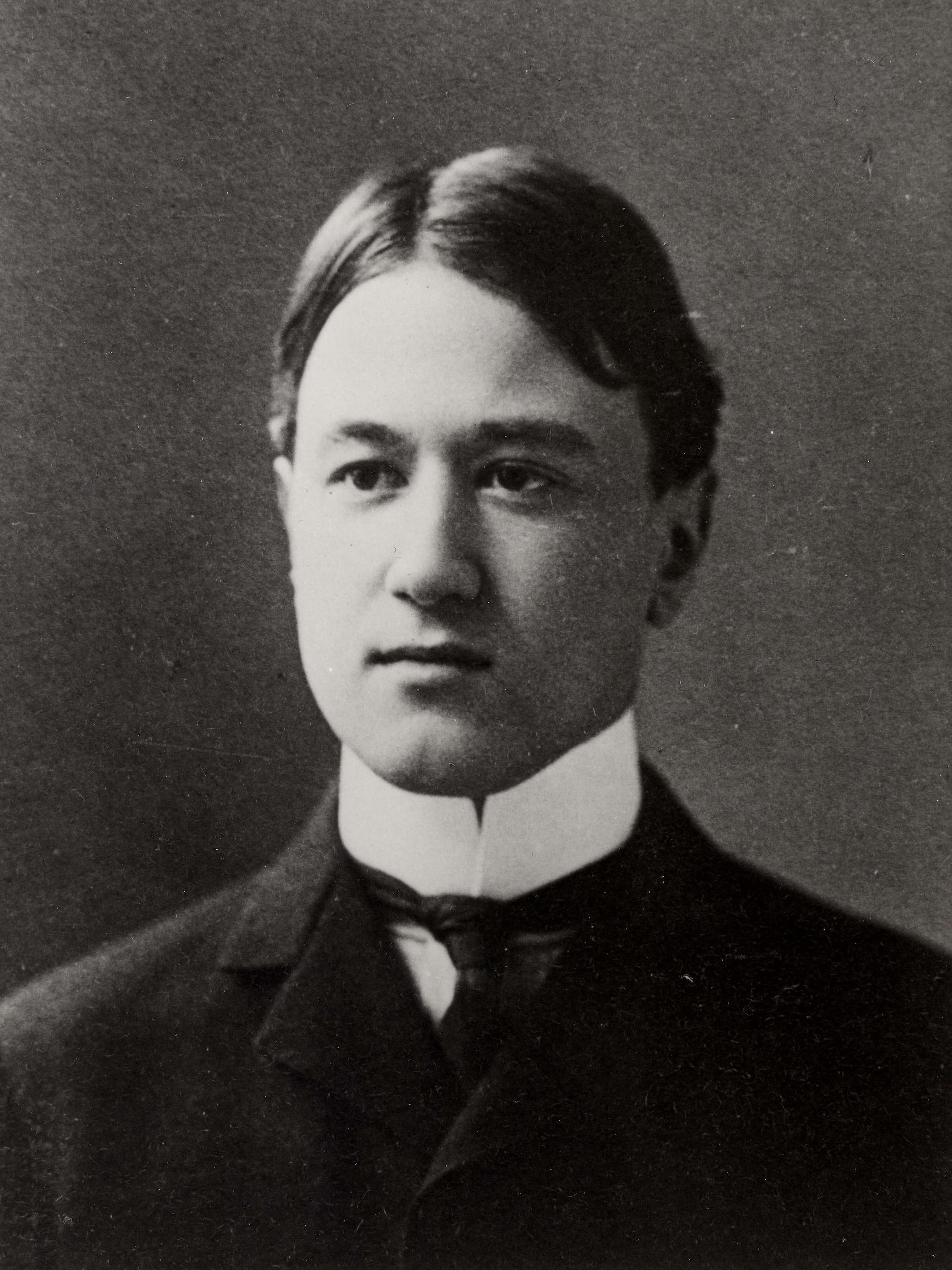
- Ives's graduation portrait from Yale University, c. 1898
- Style: Romanticism
- Form: Sonata form
- Composed: c. 1896–1897
- Publisher: Subito Music Publishing
- Duration: 8 minutes
- Scoring: Symphony Orchestra

Premiere
- Date: September 15, 2007
- Location: Madison, Connecticut, US
- Conductor: James Sinclair
- Performers: Orchestra New England

The Overture in G minor is an unfinished piece sketched out by Charles Ives perhaps between 1896 and 1897. It was probably a composition exercise produced under the tutelage of composer Horatio Parker. The piece was edited and completed by David G. Porter, then premiered in Madison, Connecticut, on September 15, 2007, performed by the Orchestra New England conducted by James Sinclair. Structured in sonata form, the piece was influenced by Tchaikovsky, Dvořák, and Brahms. Assessment of the work is divided.

== Background ==
In September 1894, Ives entered Yale University, studying under Horatio Parker, who at the time was considered one of the most important composers of the United States. Parker gave Ives a solid education in composition, counterpoint, and instrumentation in the Germanic European tradition. Ives would later write part of his Symphony No. 1 as his senior thesis under Parker's supervision.

Ives, encouraged by his father George, liked to experiment in his compositions. For instance, in his Psalm 67 he employed polytonality, and in his Psalm 54 he made use of whole-tone scales. However, Parker was not receptive at all towards Ives's experimentation, criticising his use of unresolved dissonances. Parker also often dismissed the compositions Ives presented him. In one case, when presented with one or two fugues on four keys, Parker joked that Ives was "hogging all the keys at one meal".

Despite Ives's later ambivalent regard towards Parker, often unfavourably comparing him with his father, his tutelage is what allowed Ives to approach large musical forms such as the symphony or string quartet. Parker was also a professional composer, while George was a dilettante.

== Composition and form ==
=== Composition ===
Originally untitled, Ives sketched the overture probably around 1896 and 1897 (although the manuscript carries no date), being a composition exercise in both orchestration and style. More specifically, it is possible that, alongside the Postlude in F, the piece was written for Parker's instrumentation class Ives had taken between 1896 and 1898, in the last two years at Yale University. The piece was left unfinished at around 291 measures, making it one of the most substantial unfinished works of the composer.

Ives did not directly mention the piece in either his work lists nor his Memos, but it was probably included in the section "Marches, Short Pieces,Overtures, etc. for Orchestra from about 1894 to 1904" in one of his work lists. When John Kirkpatrick examined the sketches, many staves were blank, several pages were missing (presumably lost) and the instrumental parts were not written in. Kirkpatrick also speculated that the piece may have been part of a lost set of overtures described as "In these United States", and that the "Overture alla Zampa" (Note: "alla Zampa" referring to Ferdinand Hérold's Overture to the Opera Zampa) may actually refer to the Overture in G minor.

The piece was edited and completed by David G. Porter. In this version, it was premiered in Madison, Connecticut on September 15, 2007, performed by the Orchestra New England conducted by James Sinclair. The score has been published by Subito Music Publishing alongside the Ives Society Editions. For his part, Sinclair arranged the piece for Symphonic Band.

=== Form ===
External audio
- Performed by the Malmö Symphony Orchestra under James Sinclair
- Overture in G minor

Tchaikovsky, Dvořák, and Brahms are the most prominent influences on the piece according to composer and teacher Jan Swafford. The piece is structured in sonata form. It begins with a slow and dramatic introduction with the tempo mark lento, followed by an allegro moderato with two contrasting themes; a bold and rhythmic first one and a more lyrical second. These materials are then developed and recapitulated, the latter part being very varied and with modulations that deviate from the conservative standards of Parker. Despite being a student composition, the piece already anticipates the "Ivesian" polyrhythm, according to Swafford.

== Instrumentation ==
The piece is scored for Symphony Orchestra.

Woodwinds

2 Flutes
2 Oboes
2 Clarinets
2 Bassoons

Brass

6 Horns (2 being tenor horns, which are ad libitum in Porter's completion)
2 Trumpets
3 Trombones
Tuba

Percussion

Timpani

Strings

Violins I
Violins II
Violas
Violoncellos
Double basses

== Assessment ==
An AllMusic review described the style of the piece as "by-the-numbers classicism", while Brian Wilson in a review from MusicWeb International noted that the overture was "hardly recognisable as the work of Ives". Music critic Andrew Clement, in a review from The Guardian, remarked the influence of Brahms. Georg Henkel, in a review for Musik an sich reaffirmed the work's "classical-romantic character ... nonetheless not without surprises". Steve Schwartz gave a highly ambivalent review in the now defunct website ClassicalCDReview, in which he praised the orchestration but criticised the work as "formulaic", awkward and a "a dull mess". On the other hand, Bob Briggs, also from MusicWeb International, gave a more favourable view of the composition, remarking its "quirkiness" and humour.

== Recordings ==
Conductor	Orchestra	Recording date	Formats	Labels	Catalogue ID	References
James Sinclair	Malmö Symphony Orchestra	2008, released 2009	CD / Digital	Naxos Records	NAXOS 8.559370	
