= Minoru Arakawa =

Japanese businessman (born 1946)

- 荒川 實

1st President of Nintendo of America
- In office April 23, 1980 – January 8, 2002
- Succeeded by: Tatsumi Kimishima

Personal details
- Born: September 3, 1946 (age 80) Kyoto, Japan
- Spouse: Yoko Yamauchi (m. 1973)
- Children: 2
- Education: Kyoto University (B.S., M.S); Massachusetts Institute of Technology (M.S)
- Minoru Arakawa's voice interview with Maximilian Schönherr, 1990.

Minoru Arakawa (荒川 實, Arakawa Minoru; born September 3, 1946) is a Japanese businessman best known as the founder and former president of Nintendo of America, and the co-founder of Tetris Online, Inc.

== Biography ==
Minoru Arakawa was born on 3 September 1946 in Kyoto, Japan, the second son of Waichiro Arakawa and Michi Ishihara. His elder brother, Shoichi, later took over the family business. His sister married a professor of medicine. Waichiro was the manager of Arakawa Textiles, and was more concerned with maintaining positive relationships with suppliers and customers than growing the company. Michi was an artist, who spent afternoons in the family garden or her studio; her paintings were hung at their family home. Arakawa's family was wealthy; the total real estate of Arakawa's family combined was about one-fifth of the downtown district in Kyoto.

Arakawa began studying at Kyoto University in 1964, taking general classes for the first two years before focusing on civil engineering. He graduated with a master's degree in 1969, before moving to Boston in 1971 to continue studying civil engineering at the Massachusetts Institute of Technology. He witnessed several protests against the United States involvement in the Vietnam War, but did not participate. Arakawa graduated MIT with a second master's degree in 1972. Following a conversation on campus with a group of young Japanese businessmen, he decided to try to find work with a trading company. Upon returning to Japan, he was hired by Marubeni, a company in Tokyo that developed hotels and office buildings. At a Christmas party in Kyoto, Arakawa met Yoko Yamauchi, daughter of Nintendo president Hiroshi Yamauchi. They married in November 1973. Arakawa, along with his wife and three-year-old daughter Maki, moved to Vancouver, Canada in 1977 for work. A second daughter, Masayo, was born in 1978.

Hiroshi Yamauchi offered Arakawa the job of establishing Nintendo of America; while Yoko opposed the position, having seen the impact of the company on her father's life, Arakawa accepted the offer. Arakawa and his wife established an office in Manhattan in 1980, and Arakawa became the company's first president. He had modest success at importing arcade games from the parent company in Japan, and then betting his small company on a huge order of Radar Scope with disastrous reception. This failure prompted the parent company's innovative creation of Donkey Kong, and he converted his warehouse full of useless Radar Scope units into a phenomenally successful inventory of Donkey Kong units. This is the debut of Mario, who Arakawa is credited with naming after the office's Italian landlord Mario Segale. Starting in 1985, he and Howard Lincoln were instrumental in rebuilding the North American video game industry from the crash of 1983, with the launch of the Nintendo Entertainment System. Arakawa also hired Howard Phillips, who would be invaluable to the creation of the Nintendo Power magazine. In January 2002, Arakawa resigned as NoA president and was succeeded by Tatsumi Kimishima, former chief financial officer of Nintendo's Pokémon subsidiary. Arakawa won a lifetime achievement award in February 2007 at the Interactive Achievement Awards.

In January 2006, Arakawa co-founded Tetris Online, Inc. with Henk Rogers and Tetris creator Alexey Pajitnov, which developed various games for Nintendo DS, Wii, iOS, and Facebook. Arakawa served as the president of Tetris Online, Inc. until March 2013. He is also an advisor to Avatar Reality.

Arakawa is played by Ken Yamamura in the 2023 movie Tetris.

Business positions
First	President of Nintendo of America; 1980–2002	Succeeded by Tatsumi Kimishima
