= Ochi (disambiguation) =

Ochi is a narrative technique characteristic of rakugo and kobanashi.

Ochi may also refer to:

- Ochi (surname), a Japanese surname
- Ochi, Kōchi, a Japanese town
- Ochi (mountain), a Greek mountain
- Ochi of Bestoon, a character first mentioned in the film Star Wars: The Rise of Skywalker
- Ochi, the titular fictional race of creatures in the 2025 film The Legend of Ochi

OCHI may refer to:

- Office of the Chief Herald of Ireland

== See also ==
- Ohi Day, a Greek holiday also spelled Ochi Day
- Ochi District (disambiguation), two districts in Japan
