= Songs My Mother Taught Me =

Songs My Mother Taught Me may refer to:

== Books ==
- Songs My Mother Taught Me, Audrey Thomas 1973
- Songs My Mother Taught Me (Marlon Brando book), an autobiography by Marlon Brando
- Songs My Mother Taught Me, a collection of stories and plays by Wakako Yamauchi

== Music ==
- "Songs My Mother Taught Me" (Dvořák), "Když mne stará matka" from Ciganské melodie (Gypsy Melodies), Op.55 - No. 4
- "Songs My Mother Taught Me" (Charles Ives song)

=== Albums ===
- Songs My Mother Taught Me (Joan Sutherland album), an album by Joan Sutherland
- Songs My Mother Taught Me, album by Lorna Luft
- Songs My Mother Taught Me, album by Magdalena Kožená: Songs by J.J. Rösler, A. Dvořák, V. Novák, L. Janáček, B. Martinů, E. Schulhoff and P. Eben.
