= Tone Roads No. 1 =

Composition by Charles Ives

- Chamber music composition by Charles Ives
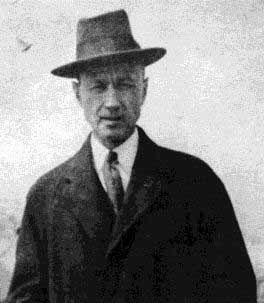
- The composer in 1913
- Genre: Modernism
- Time: common time
- Composed: 1911
- Published: 1949
- Publisher: Peermusic
- Recorded: October 1962 — Harold Farberman and the Boston Chamber Ensemble
- Scoring: Chamber ensemble or chamber orchestra

Premiere
- Date: August 10, 1949
- Location: San Francisco
- Conductor: George Barati
- Performers: Barati Chamber Orchestra

Tone Roads No. 1 is a short composition for chamber ensemble by American composer Charles Ives. It was finished in 1911.

== Background ==
Tone Roads No. 1 was written by Ives in 1911, during a productive composition in his life that led him to write many of his best known works. It was included soon after in a suite entitled Tone Roads et al. in 1915, with Tone Roads No. 2, now believed to be lost, and Tone Roads No. 3. However, the composition is published and often performed separately. In early sketches of the piece, Ives wrote that "All roads lead to Rome and to F. E. Hartwell & Co. Gent's Furnishings." The individual piece was initially subtitled "Tone Roads, rough ones—good ones, bad ones, fast ones, slow ones!".

Ives only ended up including an inscription at the end that reads "All roads lead to the Centre—in a race to the Town Meetin'." It was published many years after its completion, in 1949, by Peermusic. The first documented performance of this composition took place on August 10, 1950, in San Francisco. The performers on that occasion were the Barati Chamber Orchestra, with conductor George Barati. The piece was not performed as a set together with the other Tone Roads. A small part of this composition was later re-used in Ives's Universe Symphony, particularly bars 33 and 34. It is also possible that fragments of Tone Roads No. 1 were used in the unrealized A Symposium—Five Movements for Orchestra.

== Structure ==
Tone Roads No. 1 is scored for a small chamber ensemble consisting of a flute, a B-flat clarinet, a bassoon, a first violin, a second violin, a viola, two cellos, and a double bass. Ives also sanctioned performing the piece with a chamber orchestra, as long as the instrumentation remains the same. In scores used by conductor and composer Leonard Bernstein, who championed Ives's work, a scoring of two flutes, two clarinets in B-flat, two bassoons, twelve first violins, ten second violins, eight violas, six cellos, and four double basses is suggested for chamber orchestra performances. It has a total duration of seven to eight minutes, according to Ives. However, most performances tend to be three or four minutes long. It is marked Allegro at the beginning of the score and has a total length of 42 bars without repetitions or 70 bars with repetitions. The piece is meant to be repeated twice with first and second endings, although the first four bars are omitted after repeating.

The scoring is presumed to have changed within the few years after the piece's completion. Ives wrote in pencil in some manuscripts that it is possible to use three violins, two violas, two cellos, and double bass, apart from the wind section mentioned previously. In other manuscripts, Ives also added a trombone. However, the original instrumentation, which was discarded at the time, featured a flute, a clarinet, a trombone, and a piano.

Over the rough & rocky roads are ole Forefathers strode on their way to the steepled village church or to the farmers Harvest Home Fair or to the Town Meetings, where they got up and said whatever they thought regardless of consequences!

— Charles Ives, Inscription on the original manuscript of Tone Roads No. 1.

=== Roads ===
Written "half serious, half in fun, but carefully worked out", Tone Roads No. 1 is a piece where counterpoint is paramount, as contrapuntal lines are meant to represent roads, all converging in the center of a town, where a meeting is taking place. According to Ives, the "Tone Roads" are meant to represent roads that lead right and left (F. E. Hartwell & Co. Gent's Furnishings), right before starting an afternoon's sport. All the wagons and carriages in the township take different roads that are in different conditions, but all of them converge in "Main Street" in the end. In this case, the center of town is represented by all instruments (or roads) ending up in the same key: "All roads lead to Rome."

According to scholar Philip Lambert, there are two main "roads" in the piece which are presented in the first five bars. The first one is played by the two cellos. It features many wide melodic intervals played mostly staccato, very rhythmically and roughly. This melodic line is repeated by the flute, only transposed up a semitone. The second "road" is presented by the bassoon and the strings. It is very different from the first "road", as notes are longer and intervals are wider. When both main "roads" and their variants meet in "Main Street", located on the first and second endings in the score, all instruments play in rhythmic unison while some members of the string section use rhythmic tremolos. After a few bars, the bassoon breaks the unison to restate the second "road" and the piece is repeated.

== Recordings ==
- The first documented recording of this composition was taken in October 1962, with the Boston Chamber Ensemble with conductor Harold Farberman. It was released in 1963 on LP by Cambridge Records.
- Conductor Gunther Schuller also recorded the piece with a pickup orchestra. The recording was made at Jordan Hall in the New England Conservatory of Music, in Boston, Massachusetts, and was released in 1970 on LP by Columbia Masterworks.
- Leonard Bernstein and the New York Philharmonic recorded a live performance of the string orchestra version of this piece in November 1988. The recording was taken at the Avery Fisher Hall in New York City and was released by Deutsche Grammophon on compact disc in 1990 and re-released in 2004, 2013, and 2018.
- Conductor Ingo Metzmacher also recorded the piece with the Ensemble Modern under EMI Classics. The performance was recorded at the hall of Deutsche Bank in Frankfurt, between December 2 and 6, 1991. The recording was made available on compact disc in 1992 and re-released in 2008,
