= Hymn (Ives) =

Composition by Charles Ives

- Composition for strings by Charles Ives
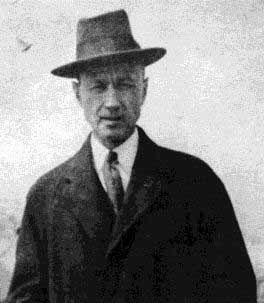
- The composer in 1913
- Catalogue: S.84/1
- Composed: August 1904, Morristown, New Jersey
- Performed: February 8, 1965; Syracuse, New York (Probably before in 1935 or 1937)
- Published: 1966
- Scoring: String orchestra

"Hymn: Largo cantabile", S. 84/1, sometimes also referred to as "Largo cantabile: Hymn" and often shortened as "Hymn", is a composition by American composer Charles Ives written in 1904. Grouped in the suite A Set of Three Short Pieces, it is published and commonly performed as a standalone work.

== Background ==
"Hymn" was first conceived as a movement in an early string quartet commonly referred to as the Pre-Second String Quartet. This piece was later extracted from bars 7 to 32 of the first movement of the quartet, which was later discarded. According to Ives's inscriptions in early manuscripts, it was written in Morristown, New Jersey, in August 1904. It was performed privately and "for fun" as early as December 1904, but was not premiered formally at around the time of composition.

Ives decided to include the "Hymn" in his suite A Set of Three Short Pieces, which was made from material he composed between 1903 and 1908. There is much speculation as to when the pieces were grouped together: sources vary from 1914 and 1935. The date of the first performance is also unknown. Correspondence between Ives and Arthur Cohn on July 27, 1935, indicates the three pieces were probably meant to be performed with "Hallowe'en". Another possible first performance of the "Hymn" was made by Bernard Herrmann, when he wrote to Ives on October 26, 1937, that "in about two weeks, I think I will be able to do your Two Pieces for Strings, the Largo ('Hymn') and 'Hallowe'en' on a Friday program, but I will surely write you when I know definitely."

The first documented performance of the piece as a movement in the set took place at the Crouse Auditorium, in Syracuse University, in Syracuse, New York, on February 8, 1965. The concert, sponsored by the Syracuse School of Music, was given by a student chamber ensemble. A second performance also took place on December 1, 1966, at Carnegie Recital Hall in New York City. The piece was performed by the [artt Chamber Players, a small ensemble consisting of violinists Abraham Mishkind and Elaine Mishkind, violist Louise Schulman, cellist Judith Glyde, double bassist Bertram Turetzky, and pianist Charles Gigliotti. The program on that occasion announced that it was the "first performance of complete set anywhere."

It was published more than half a century later, in 1966, by Peermusic. Out of all the pieces that make up the Set, this is the only piece that is available individually.

== Structure ==
This compositions has an approximate duration of three minutes and 32 bars. It is scored for string orchestra, consisting of first and second violins, violas, cellos, and double basses. The string orchestra version also requires a solo cello. When grouped in A Set of Three Short Pieces, it can also be played by a simple string quartet and double bass. The piece features free counterpoint around two hymn melodies: "More Love to Thee" and "Olivet". It is marked Largo cantabile in the score, later progressing to Più animando in bar 19.

== Recordings ==
"Hymn" has sometimes been recorded as a work separately from the Set. Here is a list of recordings of the piece: (Note: Whenever the recording contains the "string orchestra version", it means the piece was recorded as a standalone work and not with the rest of the Set of Three Short Pieces.)

- The Boston Chamber Ensemble recorded the string orchestra version of the piece in October 1962 with conductor Harold Farberman. The recording took place at New England Conservatory's Jordan Hall and was released on LP in 1963 by Cambridge Records.
- The New York String Quartet, consisting of violinists Paul Zukofsky and Romuald Teco, violist Jean Dupouy and cellist Robert Sylvester recorded the string quartet version of the piece with pianist Gilbert Kalish and double bassist Alvin Brehm. The recording was released in 1970 on LP by Columbia Masterworks.
- Leonard Bernstein and the New York Philharmonic recorded a live performance of the string orchestra version of this piece in November 1988. The recording was taken at the Avery Fisher Hall in New York City and was released by Deutsche Grammophon on compact disc in 1990 and re-released in 2004, 2013, and 2018.
- Conductor James Sinclair recorded the world premiere recording of the Ives Society Critical Edition of the string orchestra version of the piece with the Orchestra New England with solo cellist Steven Thomas. It was recorded between February and May 1990 at the Sprague Hall in Yale University in New Haven, Connecticut. The recording was released in 1990 and again in 2000 on compact disc by Koch International Classics.
- Violinists Edwin Blankenstijn and Jan Erik van Regteren Altena, violist Annette Bergman, cellist Eduard van Regteren Altena, double bassist Quirijn van Regteren Altena, and pianist Fred Oldenburg recorded the piece in 1992. The recording was released by Etcetera Records in the Netherlands on compact disc in 1993.
