= Ochi (surname) =

Ochi (written: 越智) is a Japanese surname. Notable people with the surname include:

- Chieko Ochi (越智 千恵子, born 1987), Japanese singer, model and actress
- Daisuke Ochi (越智 大祐, born 1983), Japanese baseball player
- Hayato Ochi (越智 隼人, born 1982), Japanese footballer
- Hideo Ochi (born 1940), Japanese karateka
- Ryosuke Ochi (越智 亮介, born 1990), Japanese footballer
- Takao Ochi (越智 隆雄, born 1964), Japanese politician
- Yoshiaki Ochi (越智 義朗), Japanese classical composer and percussionist
- Yuki Ochi (越智 友己, born 1990), Japanese actor
- Thomas Ochi (トーマス・オチ, born 1984), Famous Japanese GPM
