= Maximilian Schönherr =

German journalist, musician, and photographer

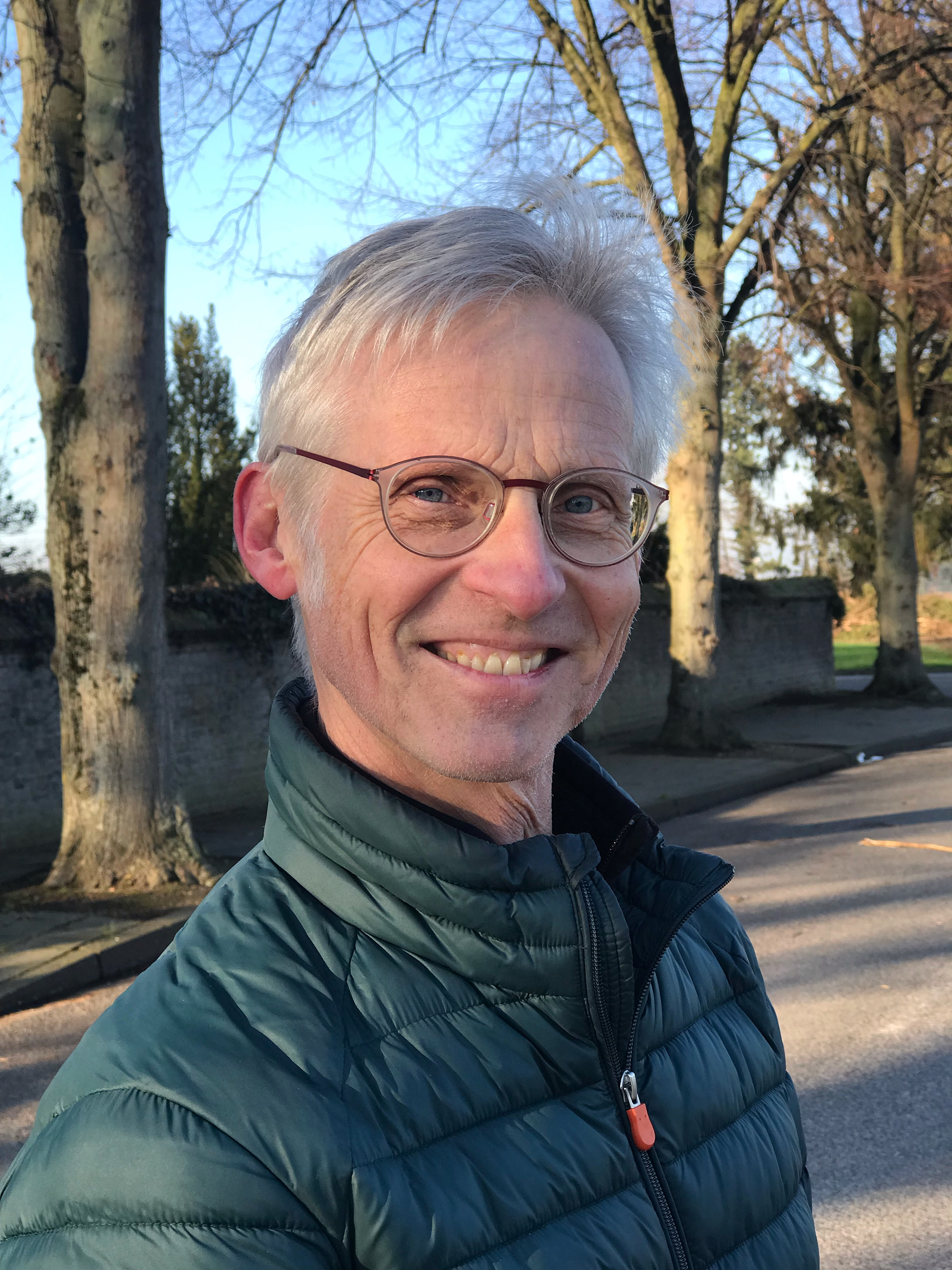
- Schönherr in 2018
- Born: 27 December 1954 (age 71); Haßfurt, Bavaria, Germany
- Education: Universities of Würzburg and Munich
- Occupations: Journalist; Musician; Photographer
- Awards: See Awards
- Website: Official website (in German)

Maximilian Schönherr (born 27 December 1954) is a German journalist, musician, and photographer.

== Life ==
Schönherr was born on 27 December 1954 in Haßfurt, Bavaria, Germany.

After studying mathematics and physics at the Universities of Würzburg and Munich, he worked for the Bayerischer Rundfunk. In 1986, he received the Kurt-Magnus-Preis for Bit, byte, gebissen, the first series on computers on ARD radio, one of the most important radio awards in Germany. From 1987 to 1988, he traveled to the United Kingdom and the United States, as well as shorter stays in South Korea, Japan and China. Since 1995, he has worked regularly for Deutschlandfunk and Westdeutscher Rundfunk (WDR).

His contributions to Deutschlandfunk are Forschung aktuell, its Saturday edition Computer und Kommunikation, and its Sunday edition Wissenschaft im Brennpunkt, amongst other things.

Since 1987, he writes occasionally for the computer magazin c't. He has written several books on computer animation with Maya and in 2001/2002 had lectureships for visual communication at the FH Aachen and the Filmakademie Ludwigsburg.

Schönherr is also a musician and photographer as well as an author in the German Wikipedia since 2007 and later also in the English Wikipedia.

== Awards ==
In 2008, Charité awarded Schönherr the media award „Medizin – Mensch – Technik“ for the radio feature „Smarties für die Prostata – IT-gestützte Visualisierungstechniken in der Medizin“. In 2009 and 2014, he received the Deutscher Hörbuchpreis for the best non-fiction.

== Books ==
- Die Moral ist gut im Land (Gedichte), Die Gießkanne 1976
- Maya 3. Ästhetik & Technik von High-End 3D-Animationen, Addison-Wesley 2000
- Maya 4 Sketches. 30 Tutorials in 3D, Addison-Wesley 2001
- Autodesk Maya – Die Referenz, Addison-Wesley 2005, ISBN 978-3-8273-2487-0

== See also ==
- SWR2 Archivradio
