= Ochi District =

Ochi District may refer to:

- Ochi District, Ehime (越智郡)
- Ōchi District, Shimane (邑智郡)

== See also ==
- Ochi (disambiguation)
