= Anne-Kathrin Peitz =

German film director and producer (born 1972)

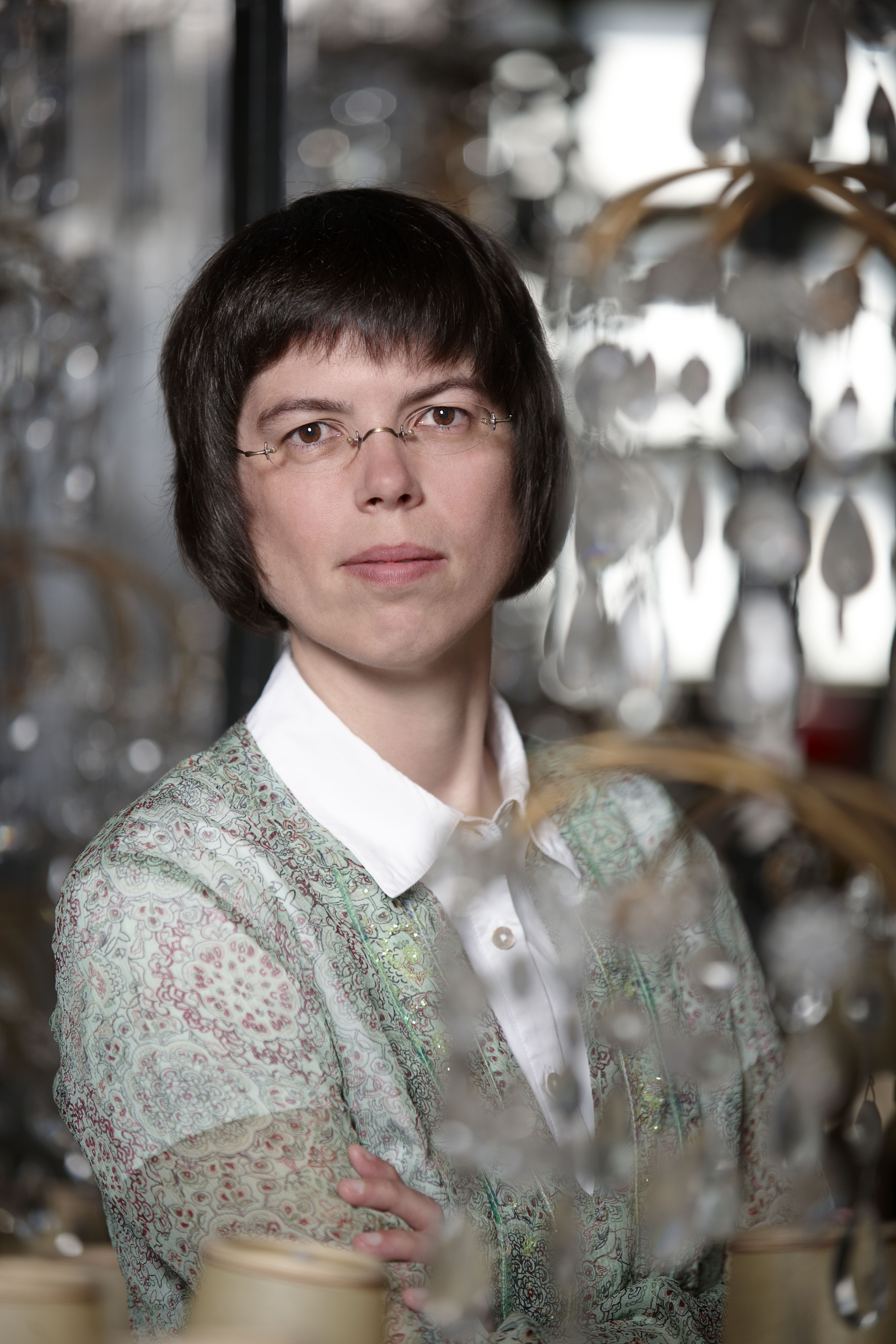
- Born: March 5, 1972 (age 54); Germany
- Occupations: Director, screenwriter, producer
- Years active: 1995–present

Anne-Kathrin Peitz (/paɪts/; German: [paɪts]; born March 5, 1972) is a German documentary screenwriter, director and producer. She primarily works on classical music-related documentaries and television specials.

== Education and early career ==
Anne-Kathrin Peitz studied English literature and Theatre in Leeds (Bachelor of Arts at University of Leeds) and Berlin (Master's degree at the Technische und Freie Universität Berlin). She resides in Leipzig.

Peitz initially worked as a journalist for the Berliner Zeitung, the Leipziger Volkzeitung and other German publications as well as English language newspapers. She later became the product manager for WERGO, the recording label for new music at Schott Music publishers. She combined her love of music and writing to serve as head of Public Relations at the state opera houses in Leipzig and Stuttgart.

== Film, television and documentary work ==
While working at the Staatsoper Stuttgart, Peitz was the production manager for The Singing City, a cinema documentary about the everyday life of a German opera house. The film won the Basler Filmpreis in 2011.

Since 2011 Peitz has beem a producer and writer for works including the multiple award-winning documentary John Cage – Journeys in Sound (WDR). Her debut as a director came in 2012 with her documentary series Sounds of the Sidewalk – On the Road with Buskers (ZDF/Arte).

Peitz has directed numerous award-winning productions for television (ZDF/Arte/WDR). Her music documentaries have been viewed throughout the world at film festivals and on numerous broadcast stations (e.g. YLE, Svt, NRK, NHK, EVT, Brava, RAI, SF). She has directed documentaries on subject matter of classical music and Avant-garde trends in the genre. Peitz's primary work has been for the German production company Accentus Music (GmbH); most of her films have been released on DVD under the label Accentus Music.

Her directorial work on Satiesfictions – Promenades with Erik Satie (WDR/Arte) earned her a nomination for the Grimme-Preis in 2016 and also received the ARD television programming award. ”Befitting its extraordinary subject, Anne-Kathrin Peitz and Youlian Tabakov’s brilliant film about the French composer and hardline agent provocateur Erik Satie aims at more than a standard life-and-works biography”, notes Philip Clark from Gramophone magazine.

Peitz's 2016 film Silenced – Composers in Revolutionary Russia (WDR/Arte) won the 2017 Czech Crystal for “Best Documentary” at Golden Prague Festival. The film looks at Russian composers of the early twentieth century, such as Arthur Lourié, Nikolai Roslavets, Alexander Mosolov, Sergei Prokofiev, Leon Theremin and Arseny Avraamov.

The Unanswered Ives – Pioneer in American Music (WDR/Arte) is about Charles Ives (1874-1954). The film won the Czech Crystal for “Best Documentary” at Golden Prague Festival in 2019.

Peitz's Arthur Rubinstein – Farewell to Chopin from 2020 is dedicated to the pianist and part of the ZDF/Arte series Magic Moments in Music.

In 2022 Peitz directed another 2022 episode for "Magic Moments in Music", on Daniel Barenboim and the West-Eastern Divan Orchestra in Ramallah. Also in 2022, Peitz explored a new music trend called Neo-Classical with the documentary The Sound Weavers: Ludovico Einaudi, Hauschka, Joep Beving, Hania Rani.

== Filmography ==
=== as producer, production manager ===
- 2011 Die Singende Stadt
- 2014 A Tribute to Krzysztof Penderecki

=== as producer, writer ===
- 2012 John Cage – Journeys in Sound

=== as director, writer ===
- 2012 Sounds of the Sidewalk – On the Road with Buskers
- 2014 Satiesfictions – Promenades with Erik Satie
- 2016 Silenced – Composers in Revolutionary Russia
- 2018 The Unanswered Ives -- American Pioneer of Music
- 2020 From the Depths of the Soul – Foray through the Musical Landscape of Armenia
- 2021 Arthur Rubinstein – Farewell to Chopin
- 2021 The Sound Weavers: Ludovico Einaudi, Hauschka, Joep Beving, Hania Rani
- 2022 Daniel Barenboim and the West-Eastern Divan Orchestra in Ramallah
- 2023 Paul Dessau: Let's Hope For The Best
- 2023 Great Moments in Music - Rudolf Nureyev's 'Swan Lake' (T.V. episode)
- 2024 Bugatti-Step

== Documentary filmography/Awards ==
Year	Title	Genre: length	Credits	Notes	Awards earned
2022	Daniel Barenboim and the West-Eastern Divan Orchestra in Ramallah	Documentary: 43 min.	Director, writer	Produced for ZDF/Arte by Sounding Images	
2022	The Sound Weavers: Ludovico Einaudi, Hauschka, Joep Beving, Hania Rani	Documentary: 52 min.	Director, writer	Produced for ZDF/Arte by EuroArts	
2021	Arthur Rubinstein – Farewell to Chopin	Documentary: 43 min.	Director, writer	Produced for ZDF/Arte by Sounding Images	
2020	From the Depths of the Soul – Foray through the Musical Landscape of Armenia	Documentary: 56 min.	Director, writer	Produced for MDR/Arte by EuroArts	
2018	The Unanswered Ives -- American Pioneer of Music	Documentary: 56 min.	Director, writer	Produced for WDR/Arte by Accentus Music	Golden Prague Film Festival 2019: Czech Crystal – Best Documentary
2016	Silenced - Composers in Revolutionary Russia	Documentary: 56 min.	Director, writer	Produced for WDR/Arte by Accentus Music	Golden Prague Film Festival 2017: Czech Crystal – Best Documentary
2014	Satiesfictions – Promenades with Erik Satie	Documentary: 56 min.	Director, writer, producer	Produced for WDR/Arte by Accentus Music Available on DVD	Nominated: Grimme-Preis 2016; Diapason d’or Arte 2016; Documentary and Short International Movie Awards (DSIMA) Jakarta 2015: Platin Award – Best European Documentary; Vierteljahresbestenliste der Deutschen Schallplattenkritik 2015
2012	Sounds of the Sidewalk – On the Road with Buskers	4 part documentary series: 4 x 26 min.	Director, writer, producer	Produced for ZDF/Arte by Accentus Music	
2012	John Cage – Journeys in Sound	Documentary: 56 min.	Writer, producer	Produced for WDR by Accentus Music Available on DVD & Blu-ray	International Television & Film Awards 2014: The Arts, Bronze Medaille; Echo Klassik 2013 – Musik-DVD Produktion des Jahres; Chicago International Film Festival 2013: Silver Hugo; International Classical Music Awards 2013 (ICMA): DVD Documentaries; Festival International du Film sur l’art (Fifa) 2013: Best Educational Film; Golden Prague Festival 2012: Czech Crystal – Best Documentary
2011	Singing City	Cinema Documentary: 90 min.	Production manager	Produced for 3sat by Filmtank Available on DVD	Basler Filmpreis 2011
