= Yoshiaki Ochi =

Japanese musician

Yoshiaki Ochi (越智義朗, Ochi Yoshiaki) (born 1955) is a Japanese ambient musician, composer, keyboardist, and percussionist. He frequently works with natural sounds, using water, wood, or stone as musical instruments.

He has performed with his brother Yoshihisa Ochi (越智義久) as the Ochi Brothers, as well as with the American microtonal bassoonist Johnny Reinhard. He is a member of the Japan Composer's Association (JACOMPA) and has recorded a number of CDs.
