= Peitz 101 =

Pietz 101

General information
- Type: Two seat light sport aircraft
- National origin: France
- Designer: Peitz
- Number built: 1

History
- First flight: Winter 1931–32

The Peitz 101, aka Peitz Avionette, was a French amateur-built, all-metal light aircraft, first flown during the winter of 1931–32.

== Design ==
The Peitz 101 was entirely the work of M. Peitz of Rosny-sous-Bois. Without external funding or assistance, he began its construction in 1929. Structurally, it was an all-metal aircraft and was mostly metal-skinned, with the exception of its wings and rear fuselage which were fabric covered.

The Peitz 101 had a three-part parasol wing of rectangular plan out to slightly blunted tips and with an aspect ratio of 8. There was no dihedral. Ailerons filled about half the trailing edges. The wings were built around two parallel duralumin spars and had a short-span central section braced to the upper fuselage longerons with a pair of parallel, vertical cabane struts to the spars, reinforced by rearward-sloping struts from the upper longeron to the forward spar. The outer wings were braced with parallel struts from the lower fuselage to the spars at about mid-span.

The fuselage of the Peitz 101 was constructed from dural tubes, with four longerons defining its rectangular section. It was skinned with 300 μm (0.012 in) dural sheet over the forward section and with fabric aft. In an early diagram its 37 kW (50 hp) six-cylinder Anzani radial engine was shrouded within a Townend ring, though in a photograph the ring was not fitted. The passenger's open cockpit was at the centre of gravity, between the two longerons, with the pilot in a similar cockpit close behind; both were fitted with dual control. The rear fixed surfaces were triangular, with the tailplane mounted near the top of the fuselage. It carried elevators which were rectangular apart from a cut-out for rudder movement. The rudder, unlike the elevators, was balanced.

The Peitz had a tail skid undercarriage with each wheel on a steel stub axle, hinged on a V-strut from the lower fuselage and with a short vertical elastic shock absorber leg to the forward wing strut This junction was strengthened by extra struts to the forward fuselage and to the top of the forward, vertical cabane strut and by another long strut outwards to the top of the rear wing spar.

== Development ==
With limited resources and manpower, the construction of the Peitz 101 was slow. In October 1931 it was moved to Orly. The date of its first flight is not known, but test flying, with Brabant as pilot, began in the next few months. It appeared, with Service Technique de l'Aéronautique approval, in public at Orly in the Pentecost aviation festival in May 1932. The following March it was awaiting tests for its certificat de navagbilité at Villacoublay.

== Specifications ==
Data from Les Ailes, April 1933

General characteristics

- Crew: Two
- Length: 6.80 m (22 ft 4 in)
- Wingspan: 11 m (36 ft 1 in)
- Height: 2.20 m (7 ft 3 in)
- Wing area: 15 m^{2} (160 sq ft)
- Aspect ratio: 8
- Empty weight: 300 kg (661 lb)
- Gross weight: 540 kg (1,190 lb)
- Powerplant: 1 × Anzani 6-cylinder 6-cylinder, two row radial, 37 kW (50 hp)
- Propellers: 2-bladed Merville

Performance

- Maximum speed: 145 km/h (90 mph, 78 kn)
- Service ceiling: 6,000 m (20,000 ft)
- Time to altitude: 25 min to 3,000 metres (9,800 feet)
