= Ives, Songs =

Ives, Songs is a ballet made by New York City Ballet ballet master Jerome Robbins to songs of Charles Ives:

- "The Children's Hour"
- "Memories, Part A: Very Pleasant"
- "Waltz"
- "The Cage"
- "The See'r"
- "Two Little Flowers"
- "At the River and Serenity"
- "He is There"
- "Tom Sails Away"
- "White Gulls"
- "Songs My Mother Taught Me"
- "There is a Lane"
- "In Summer Fields"
- from the "Incantation"
- "Autumn"
- "Like a Sick Eagle"
- "Elegie"

The premiere took place on February 4, 1988 at the New York State Theater, Lincoln Center, with scenery by David Mitchell, costumes by Florence Klotz and lighting by Jennifer Tipton. The singer was Timothy Nolen and the pianist Gordon Boelzner. Other works to the music of Ives in the City Ballet repertory include Peter Martins' Calcium Light Night, George Balanchine's Ivesiana and Eliot Feld's The Unanswered Question.

== Original cast ==
- Maria Calegari
- Stacy Caddell
- Katrina Killian
- Margaret Tracey
- Lauren Hauser
- Melinda Roy
- Lisa Jackson
- Florence Fitzgerald
- Stephanie Saland
- Alexandre Proia
- Jeppe Mydtskov
- Laurence Matthews
- Michael Byars
- Tom Gold
- Robert Lyon
- Damian Woetzel
- Philip Neal
- Jeffrey Edwards
- Otto Neubert
