= Folgore da San Gimignano =

Italian poet

Folgore da San Gimignano [folˈɡoːre da (s)san dʒimiɲˈɲaːno], pseudonym of Giacomo di Michele or Jacopo di Michele (c. 1270 – c. 1332), was an Italian poet.

His poetry mostly celebrates the pleasures of courtly life in Tuscany, such as hunting, jousting and feasting. Thirty-two sonnets are attributed to him, almost all of them grouped into three corone (sonnet sequences): two, written around 1309–1317, on the days of the week and the months of the year, and one on the knighting of a young Florentine. The sonnets on the days and months adapt the Provençal plazer, a poem listing pleasant things, combining it with the older literary tradition of poems on the months and days. Some of his other sonnets are political, with an anti-Ghibelline tone.

His corone were later satirized by Cenne della Chitarra.

Little more is known about his life: he is cited in a document in 1295 and other sources date his death to 1332.

== Cultural references ==
- Two of his sonnets, April and May, were set to music in Primavera che non vi rincresca, a composition written in 1971 by Italian composer Lorenzo Ferrero.
- Both Folgore and Cenne are mentioned in Francesco Guccini's "Canzone dei dodici mesi" ("Song of the Twelve Months"), from the album Radici (1972).
