= Accentus Music =

German classical music record label and production company

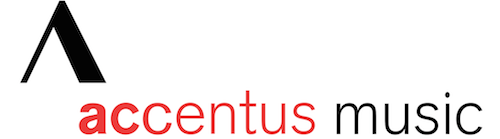
- Founded: 2010
- Founder: Paul Smaczny
- Distributors: WildKat PR; Presto Classical; Naxos Records
- Genre: Classical
- Country of origin: Germany
- Location: ACCENTUS Music GmbH; Dittrichring 14; 04109 Leipzig (DE)
- Official website: www.accentus.com

Accentus Music is a German classical music record label and production company founded in March 2010 in Leipzig, Germany, where the company is based. The label produces audio recordings (CD) and video (DVD/Blu-ray).

== History ==
Based in Leipzig, Germany, Accentus Music is a record label, film and audio production company that was founded by film producer Paul Smaczny; he had worked for EuroArts the 20 years prior to founding Accentus. Accentus Music products have become well established in the contemporary classical and music research fields. Directors, screenwriters and cinematographers associated with productions for Accentus Music include Anne-Kathrin Peitz.

The company has its own staff of 12 producers, directors, camera operators, audio producers and editors. Establishing itself as a DVD/Blu-ray label on the classical music market in 2010, Accentus produces concert and opera recordings (audio and video) as well as feature-length documentaries and artist portraits. The DVD and Blu-ray releases include productions featuring artists such as Claudio Abbado, Daniel Barenboim, Riccardo Chailly, Evgeny Kissin, Martha Argerich, the New York Philharmonic, the Staatskapelle Berlin as well as many others. The products include classical music recordings, high-profile concert and opera performances as well as feature-length documentaries. The label has also had a close association with the Gewandhausorchester Leipzig and the Staatskapelle Berlin. Accentus works closely with major television production companies in Europe such as WDR, Arte, RBB, SWR, ZDF and numerous other broadcasters to produce special shows and documentaries for regularly scheduled programming. The company has over 160 commercial products available to date.

Productions by Accentus are regularly featured and film festivals around the world and have earned them numerous honors such as the 2017 "Czech Crystal", Gramophone Classical Music Award (2017), Label of the Year at the 2015 International Classical Music Awards (ICMA) as well and many others. Reviews of Accentus recordings are consistently featured in classical music publications and major journals including Der Spiegel, Fono Forum, Rondo, Wiener Zeitung, Gramophone Magazine, BBC Music Magazine, the Guardian, Classic FM Magazine, Crescendo Magazine and International Record review. The label has built and manages a YouTube channel which is viewed worldwide. Accentus also uses WildKat PR for their promotion and distribution. The label's recordings and DVD's are offered through numerous sites such as Presto Classical and Naxos Records. In 2020 the label produced a commemorative set of videos to mark their 10th Anniversary.

== Productions and distribution (partial lists) ==
=== Documentary ===
- The Unanswered Ives -- American Pioneer of Music (2018)
- Maestras – The Long Journey Of Women To The Podium (2016)
- Music, War and Revolution – a three-part documentary series (2016)
- Arvo Pärt – The Lost Paradise (2015)
- Satiesfictions (2014)
- Sounds of the Sidewalk – On the Road with Buskers (2013/14)
- John Cage – Journeys in Sound (2012)
- A Year in the Life of the Boys Choir Leipzig (2012)

=== Live music video ===
- Mozart: Le Nozze di Figaro Staatsoper Unter den Linden, Berlin (2018)
- Lucerne Festival 2017 – Sir Simon Rattle’s farewell as principal conductor of Berliner Philharmoniker (2017)
- Mahler 8 – The Lucerne Festival Orchestra and its new music director Riccardo Chailly (2016)
- Berg’s Wozzeck with Christian Gerhaher at Zurich Opera House (2015)
- Vincenzo Bellini: Norma – From China NCPA Beijing (2015)
- St. Matthew Passion – St. Thomas Boys Choir Leipzig and Georg Christoph Biller (2012)
- Tango Buenos Aires – Café de los Maestros & Friends (2011)

== Awards and honors ==
=== Awards for label ===
Year	Award Received
2015	ICMA Label of the Year

=== Awards for individual CDs, DVDs, documentaries and projects ===
Year	Title of production	Genre	Notes	Awards received
2019	The Unanswered Ives -- American Pioneer of Music	Documentary: DVD	Produced for WDR/Arte by Accentus Music	Golden Prague Film Festival 2019: Czech Crystal – Best Documentary Dedicated to Music, Dance and Theater
2019	Mozart: Le Nozze di Figaro	Performance Video (Opera): DVD	Produced by Accentus Music	ICMA Best Video Performance
2018	Beethoven: The Complete Symphonies	5-CD set	Produced by Accentus Music	ICMA Best Collection
2017	Szymanowski: Overture op. 12, Lutoslawski: Cello Concerto, Symphony No. 4	Concert Video: DVD	Produced by Accentus Music	ICMA Best Collection
2017	Alban Berg: Wozzeck	Performance Video (Opera): DVD	Produced by Accentus Music	ICMA Video performance; Gramophone Classical Music Awards: Opera; BBC Music Magazine Awards: Best DVD
2016	Silenced - Composers in Revolutionary Russia	Documentary: DVD	Produced for WDR/Arte by Accentus Music	Golden Prague Film Festival 2017: Czech Crystal – Best Documentary
2016	Gustav Mahler: Symphony No. 7	Concert Video: DVD	Produced by Accentus Music	ICMA DVD performance
2015	Johann Sebastian Bach: The Art of Fugue; Johann Sebastian Bach: Goldberg Variations	Concert Video: DVD	Produced by Accentus Music	ICMA Special Achievement Award; International Festival of Films on Art: Award for Best Essay
2015	Adam’s Passion – Arvo Pärt, Robert Wilson	Documentary: DVD	Produced for WDR/Arte by Accentus Music Available on DVD & Blu-ray	Diapason d'Or
2015	Barbara Hannigan – Concert and Documentary	Concert/Documentary: DVD	Produced by Accentus Music Available on DVD & Blu-ray	Festival International du Film sur l’art (FIFA) 2015: Award for Best Portrait
2014	Satiesfictions – Promenades with Erik Satie	Documentary: DVD	Produced for WDR/Arte by Accentus Music Available on DVD & Blu-ray	Diapason d'Or; Documentary and Short International Movie Awards (DSIMA) Jakarta 2015: Platin Award – Best European Documentary; Vierteljahresbestenliste der Deutschen Schallplattenkritik 2015
2013	Isang Yun - In between North and South Korea	Documentary: DVD	Produced for by Accentus Music Available on DVD & Blu-ray	Golden Prague Festival 2013: Special Mention for Extraordinary Artistic Achievement; Mumbai International Film Festival: Best Documentary (2014)
2012	John Cage – Journeys in Sound	Documentary: DVD	Produced for WDR/Arte by Accentus Music	International Television & Film Awards 2014: The Arts, Bronze Medaille; Echo Klassik 2013 – Musik-DVD Produktion des Jahres; Chicago International Film Festival 2013: Silver Hugo; ICMA DVD Documentaries; Festival International du Film sur l’art (Fifa) 2013: Best Educational Film; Golden Prague Festival 2012: Czech Crystal – Best Documentary
2012	Gustav Mahler: Symphony No. 9	Concert Video: DVD	Produced by Accentus Music	Diapason d'Or (2011); ICMA DVD performance; BBC Music Magazine Awards: Best DVD
2012	Anton Bruckner: Symphony No. 5	Concert Video: DVD	Produced by Accentus Music	Gramophone Award: DVD performance
