= Johnny Reinhard =

American musician (born 1956)

Johnny Reinhard (born 1956) is a microtonal composer, bassoonist, author and conductor.

Reinhard employs many avant-garde techniques in his bassoon performance such as glissando and multiphonics, as well as uses just intonation and other microtonal tuning systems. Notable compositions by Reinhard include "Dune" (1990), "Cosmic rays" (1995), "Middle-Earth" (1999), "Talibanned Buddhas" (2000), and "Semantics of tone" (2007). He reconstructed and performed Charles Ives' Universe Symphony in 1996. The European premiere of this work was to be performed in Cologne in May 2020.

In 2024, Johnny's book "The Ives Universe - A Symphonic Odyssey" came out on CE Books (Composer's Edition).

== Biography ==
Reinhard, the son of Mortimer Reinhard and Francine Zakos, grew up in the Midwood section of Brooklyn. He attended John Dewey High School, and earned a Bachelors of Music degree at the North Carolina School of the Arts in Winston-Salem, North Carolina. He earned a Masters of Music degree at the Manhattan School of Music and was offered a fellowship in ethnomusicology at Columbia University. Reinhard later taught at New York University.

Reinhard's work with microtonal music led him to create The American Festival of Microtonal Music, Inc. (AFMM) in 1981. This organization has created an ongoing concert series intended “to showcase past and contemporary microtonal music and to introduce microtonality to the listening public.” As the founder of the AFMM, Reinhard has helped organize more than three decades of concerts around the world, including the organization's yearly Microfests. The AFMM continues to be active today. Reinhard has recently donated the organization's records to Furman University, which will make a collection from these materials in their Special Collections and Archives.

On the album Odysseus, Reinhard collaborated with pioneering microtonal guitarist Jon Catler.

He is also a member of Trio on the Cuff, as of 2005 the world's only bassoon (Reinhard), didgeridoo (Ulrich Krieger), and miscellaneous percussion (Yoshiaki Ochi) trio.

== Discography ==
- Johnny Reinhard et al. : Raven, 1999.
- Live at the DOM / Alternativa Festival, 2000.
- Johnny Reinhard : Odysseus, Pitch Records P-2002-1, 2004.
- Johnny Reinhard : Bassoonist, 2010.
- Johnny Reinhard : The Universe Symphony, 2011.
- Johnny Reinhard and Michael Hafftka : True, 2013.
- Johnny Reinhard and Philip Corner : Ear Gardens, 2016.

More information on some of Reinhard's performances and compositions can be found on his Bandcamp page.

== Bibliography ==
- Bach and Tuning, Peter Lang, (2016)
- 8th Octave Overtone Tuning and Bassoon Fingerings in 128 (2016)
- The Transcendental Tuning of Charles Ives. Vision Edition. (December 2023) ISBN 978-1-7397815-8-3
- The Ives Universe - A Symphonic Odyssey. Vision Edition. (July 2024) ISBN 978-1-7397815-5-2
- Circular Reasoning - Secrets of Baroque Tuning, co-authored with Witold Maciak. Vision Edition. (June 2025) ISBN 978-1-0687122-4-1
