= Symphony No. 1 (Ives) =

- by Charles Ives
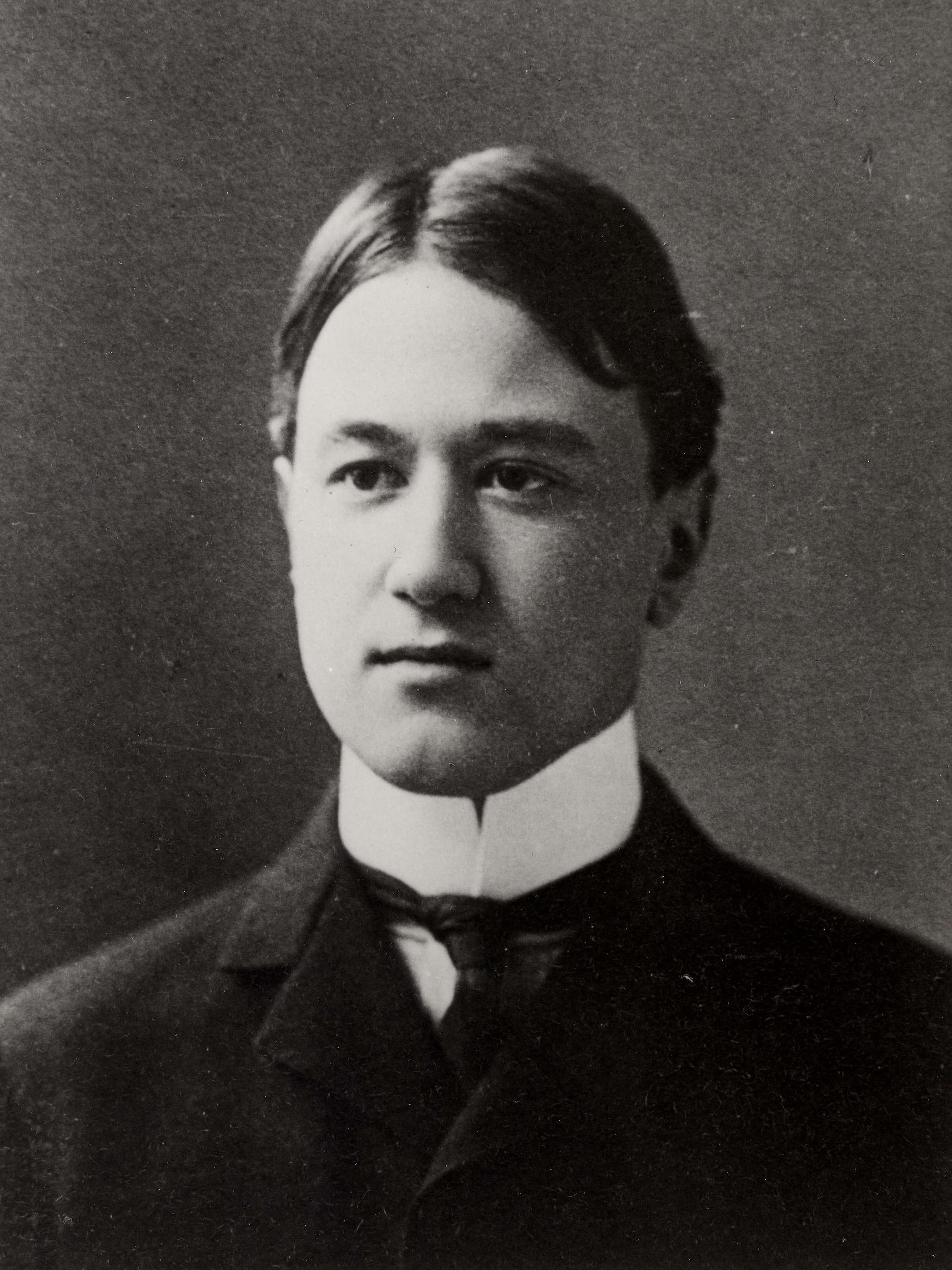
- Ives in 1898
- Composed: 1898 – 1902
- Duration: 35 minutes
- Movements: 4
- Scoring: orchestra

Charles Ives's Symphony No. 1 in D minor, written between 1898 and 1902, is scored for 2 flutes, 2 oboes, cor anglais, 2 clarinets, 2 bassoons, 4 horns, 2 trumpets, 3 trombones, tuba, timpani and strings. There is also an optional part for a third flute.

There are four movements:

1. Allegro
2. Adagio molto (Sostenuto)
3. Scherzo: Vivace
4. Allegro molto

A typical performance lasts 35–37 minutes.

== In popular culture ==
This symphony is regularly alluded to in Michael Moorcock's 1971 novel A Cure for Cancer.

== Discography ==
In general, since the work lasts about 40 minutes, leaving 40 minutes on a CD, it is usually paired with either No. 2 or No. 4. For example, the Hyperion Records CD by the Dallas Symphony Orchestra conducted by Andrew Litton also includes Symphony No. 4 and Central Park in the Dark. The Naxos Records CD of the RTÉ National Symphony Orchestra conducted by James Sinclair includes instead the "Emerson" Concerto.

- Chicago Symphony Orchestra conducted by Morton Gould (premiere recording, RCA LSC-2893, 1966)
- Chicago Symphony Orchestra conducted by Michael Tilson Thomas (Sony Classical, 1991)
- Detroit Symphony Orchestra conducted by Neeme Järvi (Chandos CHAN 9053, 1992)
- RTÉ National Symphony Orchestra conducted by James Sinclair (Naxos 8.559175, 2003)
- Dallas Symphony Orchestra conducted by Andrew Litton (Hyperion Records, 2006)
- Melbourne Symphony Orchestra conducted by Sir Andrew Davis (Chandos CHAN 5152, 2015)
- Los Angeles Philharmonic Orchestra conducted by Zubin Mehta
- Los Angeles Philharmonic Orchestra conducted by Gustavo Dudamel
- Philadelphia Orchestra conducted by Eugene Ormandy
