= Hallowe'en (Ives) =

Composition by Charles Ives

- by Charles Ives
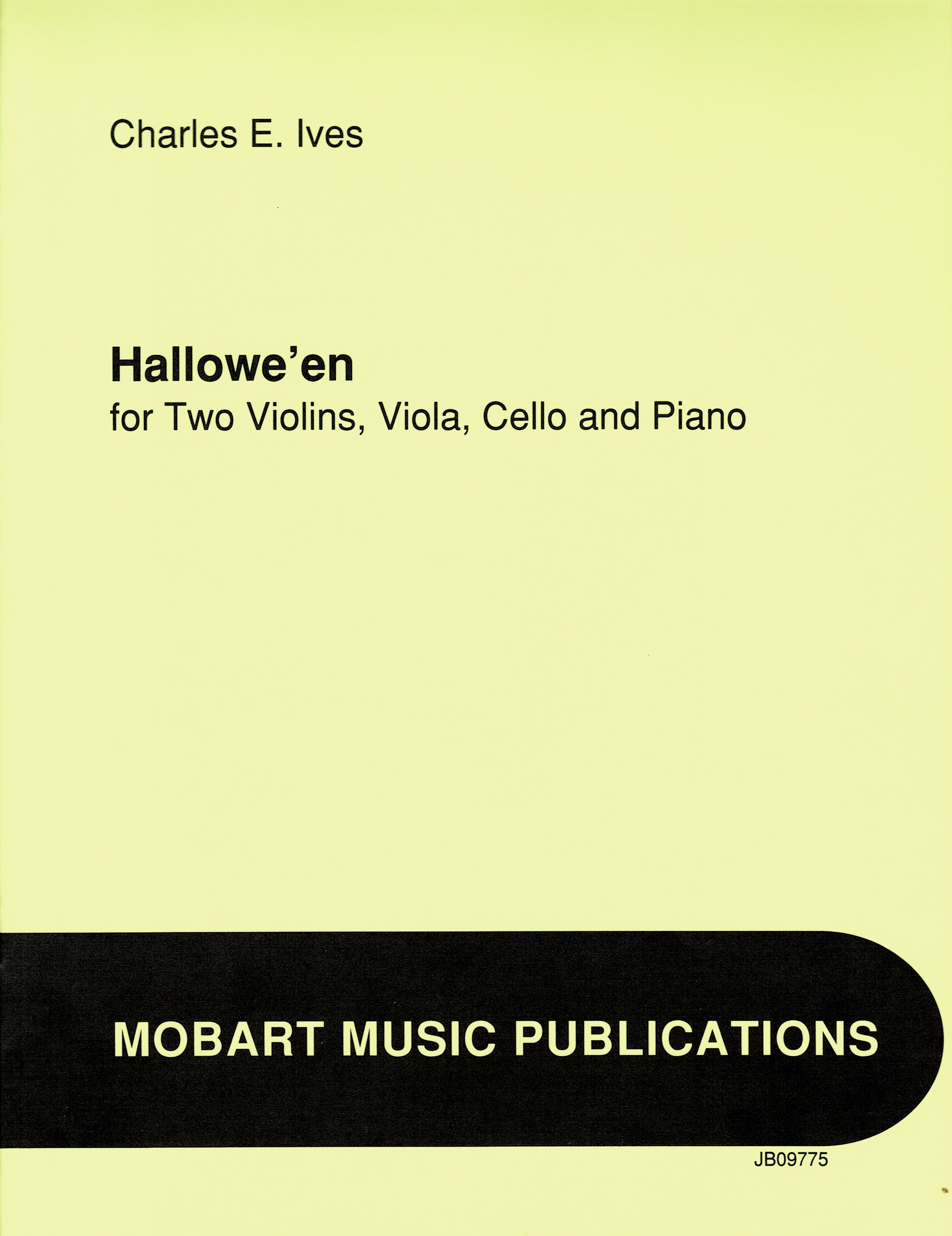
- Cover sheet of the score and parts published in 1977
- Composed: Probably April 1, 1907 (or 1906) rev. 1911
- Performed: April 22, 1934 – New York City
- Published: 1949:
- Scoring: Piano quintet

Hallowe'en, also initially entitled Allegro vivace: Hallowe'en, is a short composition for piano quintet by American composer Charles Ives. It was probably composed in 1907 and was part of Three Outdoor Scenes, a collection of pieces that also included Central Park in the Dark.

== Background ==
Ives's inspiration to conceive Hallowe'en comes from his memories of childhood. As the composer himself explained, Hallowe'en is "but a take-off of a Halloween party and bonfire – the elfishness of the little boys throwing wood on the fire, etc." It was probably composed on April 1, 1906, or 1907 and revised in 1911, although the manuscript does not show dates other than "1st of April". The 1906 hypothesis is based on the fact that Ives wrote Hallowe'en while in Pine Mountain, which he visited often on Sundays since 1901; the 1907 hypothesis, however, is based on the fact that the $1 paper the piece was written on was only available from 1907. There is also a possibility that no dates are correct, since it is not clear whether Ives wrote "Hallowe'en (on the 1st of April!)" as a date or rather as a reference to April Fools' Day, which would render the chronology inconclusive. According to Drew Massey, the joking aspect of the composition may indicate that Ives may not have been serious when he wrote the inscription.

The piece would not have a formal first performance until April 22, 1934, where an unidentified chamber orchestra performed it at the Alvin Theater in New York City, with conductor Albert Stoessel. This performance took place in a concert of music and dance organized by Martha Graham and her group and sponsored by the Pan American Association of Composers. The Ives works performed on this occasion also included The Pond and The Gong on the Hook and Ladder, all being premiered as an instrumental interlude. The piece had a second performance at the Community Playhouse in San Francisco, in a concert of music and dance organized by Betty Horst Concert Dance Group. This performance was conducted by Henry Cowell and sponsored by the New Music Society of California.

Hallowe'en was only published in 1949 by Bomart Music Publications, initially intended to be the first movement of a short suite for orchestra entitled Three Outdoor Scenes, the other pieces being The Pond and Central Park in the Dark. However, the other pieces were published after a long time and Bomart failed to identify the set of pieces with a collective title. Although the title of the set is present in the score, the piece is not normally published in that set and is currently being sold separately. The copyright was reassigned to Mobart Music Publications in 1977. It was also projected to be a part of a different set of pieces for chamber ensemble, entitled Set of Three Pieces for Small Orchestra, which included The Pond and The Gong on the Hook and Ladder. This grouping was meant to serve only for performance. This piece later became the second section in the ballet Ivesiana.

== Structure ==
This is a short piece, with a duration of 2 to 3 minutes and 18 bars without repetitions. It is scored for a first and a second violin, a viola, a cello, and a piano, with the possibility of adding a drum or a bass drum ad libitum. The composition is intended to be played several times with a different tempo each time, returning from the mark D. C. and playing the coda the last time, as customary. Ives provided two ways in which the piece can be played:

It has been observed by friends that three times around is quite enough, while others stood for the four—but as this piece was written for a hallowe'en party and not for a nice concert, the decision must be made by the players regardless of the feelings of the audience.

— Charles Ives
- If the piece is played four times:
  - First time: Played Allegretto and pp, only cello and second violin.
  - Second time: Played Allegro moderato and mp, only first violin and viola.
  - Third time: Played Allegro molto, all strings playing f while piano plays p. Piano is meant to play only the outer notes in each chord, that is, the uppermost and lowermost notes in each hand.
  - Fourth time: Played Presto (or as fast as possible) and ff. All notes have to be played followed by the coda.
- If the piece is played three times:
  - First time: Played Allegretto and pp. Only second violin and cello.
  - Second time: Played Allegro and mf. All strings are asked to play, with the optional addition of the piano, which has to play only the upper and lower notes in each hand pp if he chooses to do so.
  - Third time: Played Presto and ff. All notes have to be played followed by the coda.

Whenever the repetition is not followed by the coda, all string players are asked to play the last two bars in each repetition. The drum or bass drum part is not present in the score. However, Ives proposed that a drum or a bass drum be used in the fourth repetition and coda. Ives specified that the percussion part would be "impromptu or otherwise".

Each string part in the piece largely consists of scales. However, each instrument is in a different key: the first violin plays scales in C major; the second violin, in B major; the viola, in D-flat major; and the cello, in D major. All string parts share a canonic and tonally stratified structure. The double canon between Violin I-Viola and Violin II-Cello is made evident by the visual resemblance of each pair of voices on the page. The violin I's C major scales on the G clef are visually identical to the viola's D major scales on the C clef, whereas the Violin II's B major scales on the G clef and the cello's D major scales on the F clef are also the same, only transposed to an octave lower in both cases. After that, the piece becomes also canonic in accents, phrases, durations, and spaces. The piano plays chords, which become faster and faster as the piece develops.

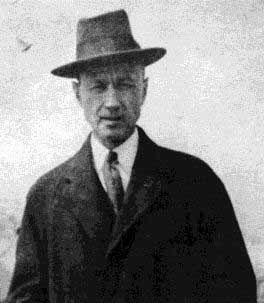
The composer in 1913

=== Workmanship ===
Ives was particularly fond of this composition, and he often described it as "one of the most carefully worked out [compositions] (technically speaking), and one of the best pieces (from the standpoint of workmanship) that I've ever done". In fact, he used the term workmanship with positive connotations to refer to Hallowe'en, which he described as music that is both organized and original. He also added that "I happened to get exactly the effect I had in mind, which is the only (at least an important) function of good workmanship", in a way conveying the idea that good music has progressive workmanship and that that is part of what makes Hallowe'en one of his "best pieces".

== Recordings ==
- The piece was first recorded together with a handful of other Ives's compositions in 1951. This recording was made by the Polymusic Chamber Orchestra, conducted by Will Lorin under the pseudonym Vladimir Cherniavsky. It was issued in 1951 under the Polymusic label.
- Conductor Harold Farberman recorded the piece with the Boston Chamber Ensemble at New England Conservatory's Jordan Hall in October 1962. The recording was later released in 1963 by Cambridge Records on LP.
- The New York String Quartet, which consisted of violinists Paul Zukofsky and Romuald Tecco, violist Jean Dupouy, and cellist Robert Sylvester, recorded the piece with pianist Gilbert Kalish under the Columbia Masterworks label. The piece was performed between Largo Risoluto No. 1 and No.2 and was recorded as a single track. It was released in 1970 on LP.
- Violinists John Celentano and Millard Taylor, violist Francis Tursi, cellist Alan Harris, and pianist Frank Glazer also recorded the piece in February 1974. The piece was released on a three-vinyl box set under the VoxBox label in 1976.
- Leonard Bernstein recorded the piece with the New York Philharmonic in November 1988, at Avery Fisher Hall in New York City. The recording was released by Deutsche Grammophon on compact disc in 1990, with subsequent re-releases in 2013 and 2018.
- Kent Nagano also recorded the piece with the Montreal Symphony Orchestra at the Maison symphonique in Montreal, Canada on October 29 and 30, 2015. It was released under Decca on compact disc in 2016.
