= SWR2 Archivradio =

SWR 2 Archivradio
Baden-Baden; Germany
- Broadcast area: Worldwide: Internet

Programming
- Format: Historic original sounds from German audio archives

Ownership
- Owner: SWR

History
- First air date: 1 September 2007

Links
- Website: archivradio.de

SWR2 Archivradio, commonly referred to as Archivradio, is an internet radio network by the German public broadcasting corporation SWR. It specialises in streaming historic original sounds, interviews, speeches in German language from German audio archives. The web radio stream is accompanied by a web portal which provides written information about the currently aired sound segment.

== Content ==
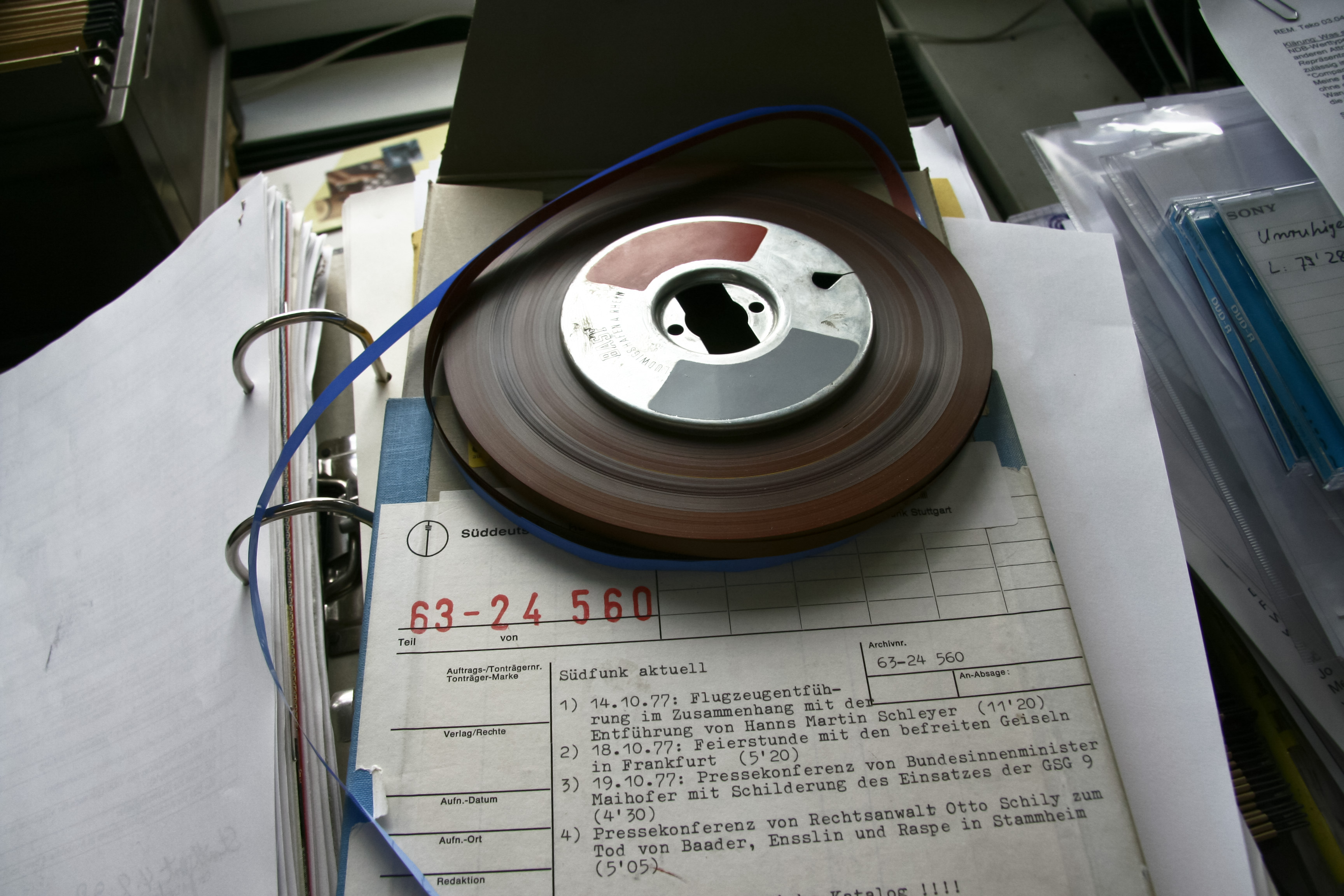
One of several tapes with original sounds from the German Autumn, streamed in full length in Archivradio

A major principle of Archivradio is that original sounds are unedited and played back in full length. Typical topics in the past have been original recordings by the East German secret police Stasi, the complete proceedings of the first literature congress in Berlin after World War II (Erster Deutscher Schriftstellerkongress) or sounds from World War I, most of them recorded on Phonograph cylinders. Archivradio also gives a voice to the archivists. They appear in interviews about the specific topics of the program.

The internet radio consists mainly of spoken word and only broadcasts music in a specific context. Archivradio has no typical presenter; there is only a speaker who briefly announces each title, the date and the source.

== History ==
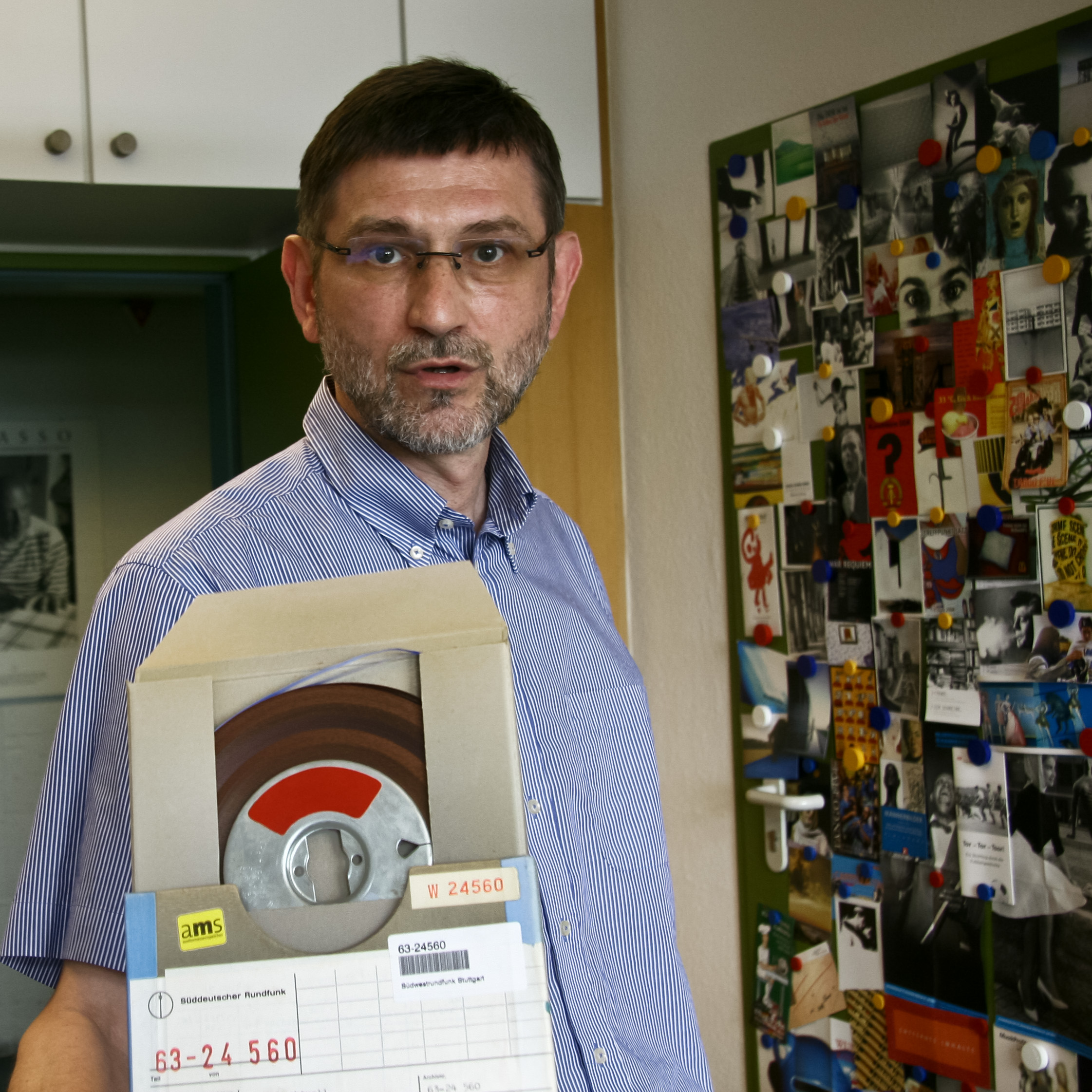
SWR-archivist Georg Polster, key person in the early days of Archivradio (2007)

Archivradio was initiated by the German public radio journalist Maximilian Schönherr and his colleague at SWR Detlef Clas in summer 2007. Schönherr's first test streams with unedited interviews from his own archive took place in 2003. The German Broadcasting Archive DRA, a non-profit foundation supported by the ARD with the largest treasures of historic original sounds in Germany, officially supports Archivradio. In 2010 the channel passed the "Drei-Stufen-Test" (three steps test), crucial for continuously staying on air. The three steps test is the certificate that Archivradio is of public and educational value and works within uncommercial limits. The funding comes from SWR2, the educational and culture FM channel of SWR. The main target audiences are historians, academics, teachers and students with historic interest.

In several cases audio segments aired via Archivradio created spin-offs like radio documentaries. Two of them received the "Deutscher Hörbuchpreis" (German audio book award) and the award for best documentary at Radio Basel, Switzerland.
