= Songs My Mother Taught Me (Charles Ives song) =

"Songs My Mother Taught Me" is a song for voice and piano, written by Charles Ives (S. 361, K. 6B21c) in 1895 and set to a poem by Adolf Heyduk. Ives' song was written some fifteen years after Antonín Dvořák's setting of the same poem, with which it shares some similarities.

There have been numerous arrangements of the Ives song with its nostalgic melody. New York City Ballet balletmaster Jerome Robbins used it for one of the dances he made in Ives, Songs.
