= James Sinclair (conductor) =

American classical conductor

James Sinclair is an American classical conductor.

Sinclair studied at Indiana University, taught at the University of Hawaii, then moved to New Haven, Connecticut in 1972, to be in proximity to Yale University, alma mater of Charles Ives. Sinclair has been the music director of Orchestra New England from 1974 to the present. He was also music director of the Yale Symphony Orchestra from 1994 to 1995.

Sinclair is notably a specialist in the music of Charles Ives; he has "spent [his] whole adult life devoted to the music of Charles Ives." He has published A Descriptive Catalogue of the Music of Charles Ives with Yale University Press and served as music director for a number of PBS documentaries, including A Good Dissonance Like a Man, about Ives. He is currently an Associate Fellow of Berkeley College and oversees the Charles Ives papers, as well as those of pianist and Ives scholar John Kirkpatrick.

As a conductor, Sinclair has recorded a number of Ives works, as part of a complete set of Ives' orchestral music projected to be in nine discs for the Naxos label. He is one of the interviewed Ives scholars in the 2018 documentary The Unanswered Ives.
