= Universe Symphony (Ives) =

Unfinished work by Charles Ives

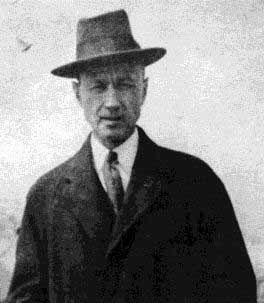
Charles Ives in 1913

The Universe Symphony is an unfinished work by American classical music composer Charles Ives.

The date of composition is unknown, but he probably worked on it periodically between 1911 and 1928. Intended to be a spatial composition for two or more orchestras, it is in three sections:

1. Formation of the waters and mountains"
2. Earth, evolution in nature and humanity"
3. Heaven, the rise of all to the Spiritual"

The Universe Symphony is a complex work, using 20 independent musical lines; each moves in a separate meter, only coinciding on downbeats eight seconds apart. According to his notes on a sketch of the piece, Ives was "striving to ... paint the creation, the mysterious beginnings of all things known through God and man, to trace with tonal imprints the vastness, the evolution of all life, in nature, of humanity from the great roots of life to the spiritual eternities, from the great inknown to the great unknown." Ives envisioned the work being performed by multiple orchestras located in valleys, on hillsides and mountains, with the music mimicking "the eternal pulse ... the planetary motion of the earth ... the soaring lines of mountains and cliffs ... deep ravines, sharp jagged edges of rock".

Pages are missing or were never written.

== Background ==
Ives conceived the idea during the autumn of 1915 while he was staying in the Adirondacks of New York State, but he left it alone until 1923, when he returned to working on it. Although he spent many years on it, many of the sketches are missing. During the 1990s there were three separate performing versions assembled, including a version by David Gray Porter (1993, Section A plus the Coda and part of a first Prelude only), Larry Austin (1994), and Johnny Reinhard (1996).

The first part ("Section A") was derived from a sketch of 1915 for a piece called "The Earth and the Heavens" or "The Earth and the Firmament", with one group of instruments representing the Earth and another group representing the Heavens, and with a group of percussion instruments representing the eternal pulse of the universe underlying both. This is the most complete large fragment of the piece, along with a Coda for the complete movement written in a similar style that shares the same four main "Earth-themes" of Section A. The main "sky-theme" is the only theme built upon a quotation, the hymn tune "Bethany" ("Nearer My God to Thee", the same hymn tune used as the basis for the Finale of his Fourth Symphony.)

There were also to be three Preludes to the Symphony, but none were completed. The most complete is the first Prelude, but again this was not completed, left only in the form of an outline-sketch with musical examples. For more information see James B. Sinclair's "Descriptive Catalogue" of Ives's music and manuscripts (1999). In addition, Reinhard has written a detailed history of Ives's composition of the Universe Symphony as well as his own process in preparing a performance edition from Ives's sketches.

== Instrumentation ==
The score calls for unorthodox instrumentation, as follows:

- Woodwinds: 9 flutes (2 doubling piccolo, 1 doubling wooden flute), 2 oboes, 3 clarinets, 5 bassoons (2 doubling contrabassoon)
- Brass: 5 trumpets, 4 horns, 4 trombones, 2 tubas
- Keyboards: piano or celeste, organ
- Strings: harp, 8 violins, 5 violas, 4 cellos, 3 double basses
- Percussion: 12 percussionists (low bell, bass drum and cymbal, low gong, bass drum, timpani, triangle, high gong, log drum, piccolo tympani, Indian drum, snare drum, 2 kinds of metal pipe, high brittle wood, medium small xylophone, clay pipes, different sizes of wood blocks and boards, low xylophone, large tambourine, small triangle, wood block, high bell, suspended cymbal, glasses, drum rims, small steel bars, castanets, marble slab)

Another realization, by conductor Larry Austin, is for the following instrumentation, broken into seven distinct groups:

- Group A (The Heavens): solo clarinet, solo viola, piano doubling celesta, 1 percussionist (vibraphone, 5 singing bowls, 4 rototoms, 2 log drums, flexatone, wooden and metal wind chimes), at least 10 violins and 2 violas
- Group B (The Heavens): 2 oboes, English horn, 1 percussionist (marimba, 4 temple blocks, claves, small gong, triangle, large suspended cymbal, wooden wind chimes, woodblock, bass drum), at least 8 violins and 2 violas
- Group C (The Heavens): 2 flutes, alto flute (doubling piccolo), 3 clarinets (one doubling bass clarinet), 1 percussionist (vibraphone, 4 ceramic cup gongs, crotale in A, large tam-tam, large triangle, small cymbal, metal wind chimes)
- Group D (The Heavens): harp, 1 percussionist (marimba, 4 woodblocks, crotale in E, large gong, castanets, medium-large cymbal, wooden wind chimes, bass drum with cymbals attached), at least 6 violins and 2 violas
- Group E (The Life Pulse): piccolo, piano, 20 percussionists (glockenspiel, 2 triangles and tambourine, first xylophone, second xylophone, ceramic bells or small pipes, 5 woodblocks, first snare drum, second snare drum, third snare drum and tom-tom, tenor drum, small gong and piccolo timpano, bass drum with cymbals attached, marimba, timpano, tam-tam, low bell, large bass drum, deep hanging bell)
- Group F (The Earth and Rock Formations): 4 trumpets (doubling 2 piccolo trumpets in Bb and one in D), 4 horns, 2 tenor trombones, 2 bass trombones, tuba, 2 bassoons, contrabassoon
- Group G (The Earth Chord): at least 5 cellos and 5 double basses

Groups A, B, C and D each require assistant conductors; group E needs as many as four assistants.

== Sources ==
- Kirkpatrick, John (1980). "Charles E. Ives". In Sadie, Stanley (ed.). The New Grove Dictionary of Music and Musicians. Vol. ix (1 ed.). London: Macmillan. pp. 414–429.
- Burkholder, J. Peter; Sinclair, James B.; Sherwood, Gayle (2001). "Ives, Charles (Edward)". Grove Music Online (8th ed.). Oxford University Press. doi:10.1093/gmo/9781561592630.article.14000. ISBN 978-1-56159-263-0. (subscription, Wikilibrary access, or UK public library membership required)
