= Heather O'Donnell =

American musician

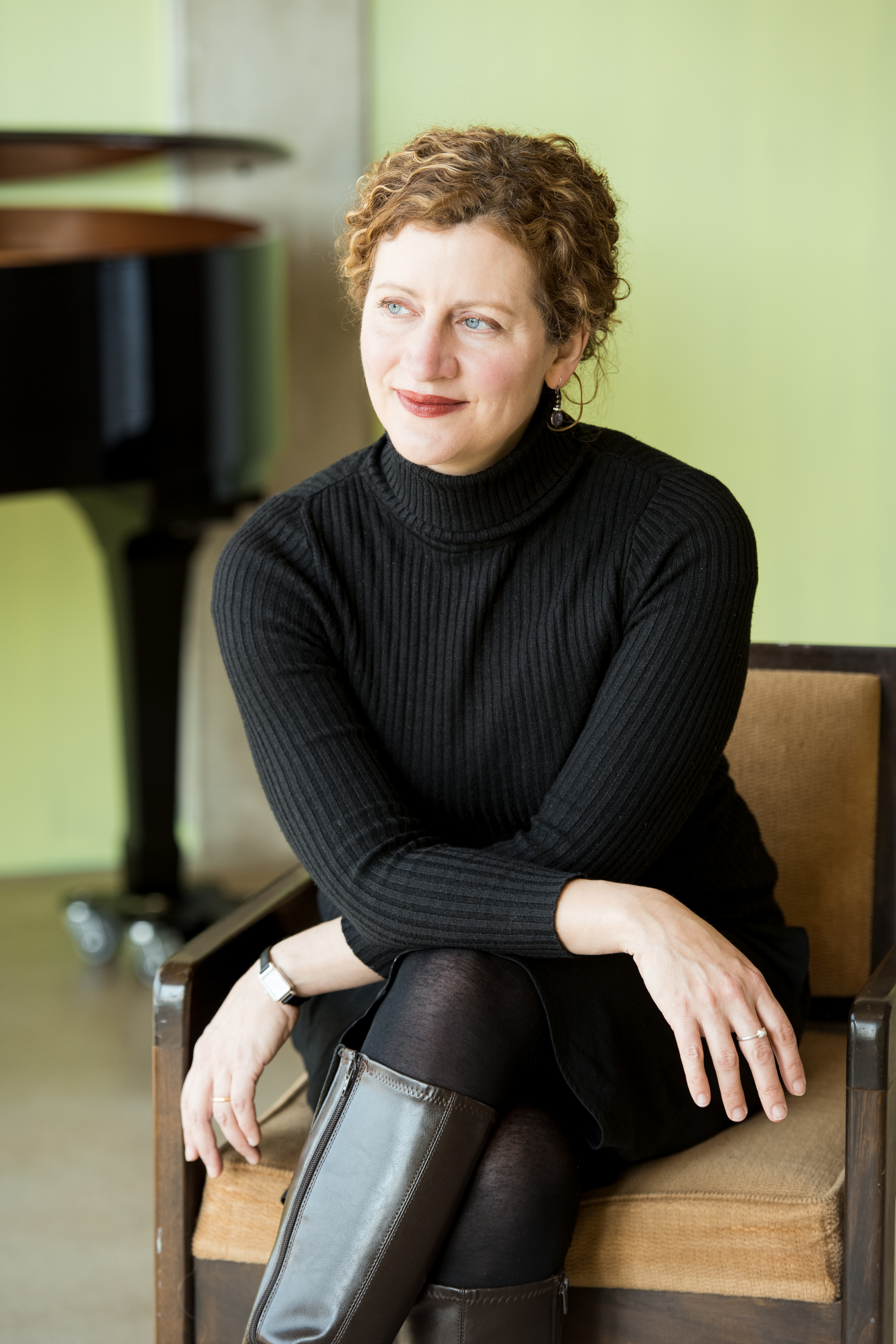

Heather O'Donnell is an American classical pianist and psychologist living in Düsseldorf, Germany.

== Life ==
O'Donnell was born in Summit, New Jersey in 1973. She began studying piano at the age of five, her most influential teachers were Charles Milgrim, Stephen Drury and Peter Serkin. She also worked closely with Yvonne Loriod, Emanuel Ax, and Claude Helffer. O'Donnell studied at New England Conservatory and Mannes College of Music, and took several courses in Philosophy and Literature at the New School for Social Research and Columbia University, and was the teaching assistant of philosopher Paul Edwards at the New School for Social Research.

Since 2010, Heather O'Donnell has been a Psychologist (M.Sc.), Artistic-Systemic Therapist (DGSF), and the founding director of TGR The Green Room. She transitioned to psychology after career-disrupting injuries, focusing on health recovery, career transitions, and systemic therapy. She holds degrees in psychology from Freie Universität Berlin and SRH Hochschule, along with certifications in musicians' health and mindfulness teaching. O'Donnell has presented at international conferences, including the Performing Arts Medicine Association Symposium and the European Network of Cultural Centres (ENCC). She has lectured at institutions such as Columbia University and the New England Conservatory and served on the Eastman School of Music faculty. In 2024, she was elected to the Board of Directors of the ENCC.

She writes on issues related to Musicians' PsychologyHeather O'Donnell (5 April 2024). "Confronting "The Beast" – Musicians' Performance Anxiety". Interlude.

== Career ==
O'Donnell plays works from the 18th-21st century, e.g. J.S. Bach's Goldberg Variations, Charles Ives's- Concord Sonata, and Maurice Ravel's Gaspard de la Nuit). She gave premieres of solo piano works (including pieces by Luciano Berio, Walter Zimmermann, James Tenney, Michael Finnissy, Frederic Rzewski, and Oliver Schneller). She has a strong affinity for the music of American composer Charles Ives, and has played and recorded his piano works extensively. She was the artistic director of commissioning projects including "Responses to Ives" and "Piano optophonique".

Since 2015, O'Donnell has been active as a psychologist (B.Sc. Psychology, M.Sc. Prevention and Health Psychology) and works with musicians and other performing artists on psychological blockages, injury prevention and rehabilitation, and other health-related issues.

In 2020 she founded The Green Room in Cologne, Germany.
