= The Unanswered Question (ballet) =

The Unanswered Question: Some Intimations of the American Composer Charles Ives is a ballet made by Eliot Feld to Charles Ives' The Unanswered Question, Calcium Light Night, Fugue in Four Keys, Mists, From the Housatonic at Stockbridge, Sonata No. 2 for Piano and Violin (In the Barn), Remembrance and An Old Song Deranged. The premiere took place April 30, 1988, at the New York State Theater, Lincoln Center, as part of New York City Ballet's American Music Festival with lighting by the Feld Ballet's Allen Lee Hughes and Willa Kim's costumes. Other works to the music of Ives in the City Ballet repertory include Peter Martins' Calcium Light Night, Jerome Robbins' Ives, Songs and George Balanchine's Ivesiana.

== Original cast ==
- Valentina Kozlova
- Buffy Miller
- Leslie Roy
- Damian Woetzel
- Albert Evans
- Jeppe Mydtskov
- James Sewell

== See also ==
- List of ballets by title
