= Three Places in New England =

Composition by Charles Ives

- Orchestral Set No. 1
- by Charles Ives
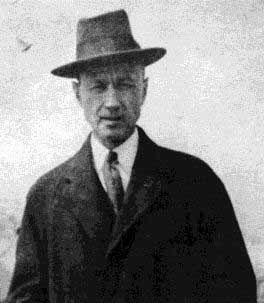
- Charles Ives (ca. 1913)
- Period: 20th-century music
- Composed: approx. 1911–14 (rev. 1929)
- Duration: about 20 minutes
- Movements: Three
- Scoring: Orchestra

Premiere
- Date: 10 January 1931
- Location: New York City
- Conductor: Nicolas Slonimsky
- Performers: Boston Chamber Orchestra

The Three Places in New England (Orchestral Set No. 1) is a composition for orchestra in three movements by American composer Charles Ives. It was written mainly between 1911 and 1914, but with sketches dating as far back as 1903 and last revisions made in 1929. The work is celebrated for its use of musical quotation and paraphrasing.

The movements (in Ives's preferred slow-fast-slow sequence, longest first and shortest last) are:

1. The “St. Gaudens” in Boston Common (Col. Shaw and his Colored Regiment)
2. Putnam’s Camp, Redding, Connecticut
3. The Housatonic at Stockbridge

Lasting just under twenty minutes, Three Places in New England has become one of Ives's most performed compositions. It exhibits signature traits of his style: layered textures with multiple, sometimes simultaneous melodies, many of which are recognizable hymn or marching tunes; masses of sound, including tone clusters; and sudden, sharp textural contrasts. Each "place" is in New England. Each is intended to make the listener experience a unique atmosphere, as if there. To this end, the paraphrasing of American folk tunes is an important device, providing tangible reference points and making the music accessible despite its avant-garde chromaticism. Three Places in New England aims to paint a picture of American ideals, lifestyle and patriotism at the turn of the 20th century.

== History ==
=== Composition ===
Three Places in New England was composed between 1903 and 1929. The set was completed in 1914 but was later revised for performance in 1929. The second piece, Putnam’s Camp, Redding, Connecticut was created from two short theater orchestra pieces composed by Ives in 1903. These pieces, "Country Band" March and Overture & March: "1776", were completed in 1904. Lyman Brewster, Ives's uncle, had asked him to compose the pieces for his play Major John Andre which was never performed due to Brewster's untimely death. In the early fall of 1912, Ives began tinkering with these compositions again. The satisfaction that Ives derived from working on the Fourth of July (the third movement of his Holiday Symphony), in which he used the trio (or middle) section of 1776, may have been the catalyst for inspiring him to reuse these lost songs and create a longer piece. By October, Ives had completed an ink score-sketch of Putnam's Camp. The final version of the piece clearly resembles its source materials, but many of the complex musical jokes that littered the originals had been replaced with simpler alternatives.

The Housatonic at Stockbridge, the third piece in the set, was composed in 1911 along with the opening movement. By 1912, after finishing Putnam's Camp, Ives had settled on the form of a three-movement orchestral set and had written the majority of it.

=== Premiere and publication ===
In 1929, Nicolas Slonimsky, conductor of the Boston Chamber Orchestra at that time, contacted Ives about the possibility of performing Three Places. Slonimsky had been urged by American composer Henry Cowell, Ives's contemporary, to program an Ives piece for some time and Three Places caught his attention.

The thorough reworking required to transform Three Places from an orchestral score to one that could be performed by a much smaller chamber orchestra renewed Ives's interest in the work. Slonimsky required that the piece be rescored for 1 flute, 1 oboe, 1 English horn, 1 clarinet, 1 bassoon, 2 horns, 2 trumpets, 1 trombone, 1 percussionist, 1 piano, 7 violins, 2 violas, 2 cellos and 1 string bass, a much smaller orchestra than the original. Ives was glad to have his piece played, but his comments on the rescoring include, on the full score of The Housatonic at Stockbridge, "piano may be used for Bassoons throughout… a poor substitute…."

Three Places was first performed on February 16, 1930 under Slonimsky's direction before the American Committee of the International Society for Contemporary Music in New York City. Although it had been rehearsed only once, the Committee was sufficiently impressed to recommend the work to the International Society, which surprisingly turned it down for performance at its festival. The first public performance was scheduled for January 10, 1931. Ives himself attended – in fact, he was funding the concert himself. The performance received mild applause, and Ives congratulated the performers backstage – "Just like a town meeting – every man for himself. Wonderful how it came out!".

After the mild success of the first performance, Slonimsky and Ives were inspired to take Three Places abroad. Slonimsky conducted the work in Paris on June 6 at a concert he described as "absolutely extraordinary" because so many important composers and critics of the time were in the audience. Their first experience of Ives left them impressed: Ives's music was not just interesting because it was composed by an American, it also fascinated them because the music really described America. Although the listeners didn't understand all the cultural references, Ives was calling attention to American ideals, issues, experiences and perspectives. For instance, in The "St. Gaudens", Ives paraphrases ragtime, slave plantation songs such as "Old Black Joe" and even patriotic American Civil War tunes such as "Marching through Georgia". The combination of such songs conjured up images of the fight for freedom in America. International recognition solidified the image of Ives as an American composer, especially strengthened by his use of borrowing from typically American-sounding pieces.

Three Places became the first of Ives's compositions to be commercially published. Slonimsky was in touch with the Boston publisher C.C. Birchard on Ives’ behalf, and by 1935 the two had negotiated a deal. Ives and Slonimsky both proofread the score note-by-note to make sure the engravings were correct. In 1935, Ives held a copy of his first work in his hands. He had requested that the binding bear his name in as small a font as possible, so as to not appear egotistical.

=== Later history ===
For many years, very little interest in performance of Three Places was aroused by its publication. After Slonimsky's retirement from conducting, the piece lay dormant until 1948, when longtime BSO concertmaster Richard Burgin programmed it on a Boston Symphony Orchestra concert. The current practice of performing Ives's chamber scores rescored for full orchestra was thus established.

In the 1970s, interest in Three Places in New England was piqued once again, this time regarding the differences between the original 1914 scoring, much of which had been lost, and the 1929 chamber-orchestra rescoring for Slonimsky's chamber orchestra. James Sinclair of Yale University, after extensive research, concluded that the 1914 orchestration could not be recreated in its entirety since only 35% of the second movement had survived Ives's cutting for the 1929 version. Sinclair created what is currently believed to be the closest replication of the 1914 score for full orchestra by extrapolating Ives's scraps, sketches and notes. The world premiere of this version took place on February 9, 1974, at Yale University's Woolsey Hall, with the Yale Symphony Orchestra, conducted by John Mauceri, honoring the composer's 100th birthday.

== Movements ==
=== I. The "St. Gaudens" in Boston Common (Col. Shaw and his Colored Regiment) ===
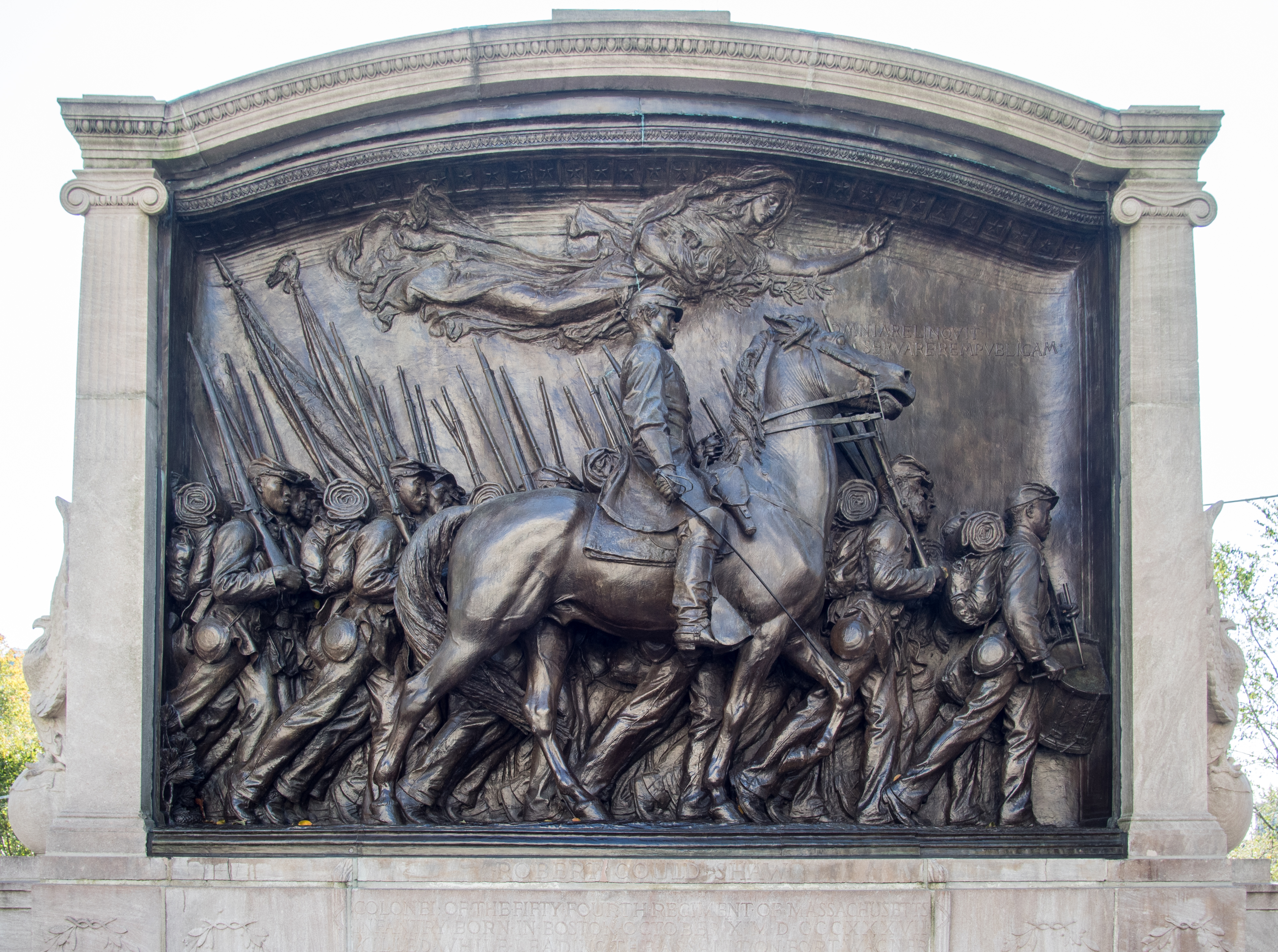
The Robert Gould Shaw Memorial in Boston

The first movement of Three Places is a tribute to the Robert Gould Shaw Memorial near the corner of Beacon and Park Streets in Boston, Massachusetts. The monument was created over fourteen years by the world-renowned artist Augustus Saint-Gaudens in honor of the 54th Massachusetts Regiment, the second all-Black regiment to serve in the Union Army during the American Civil War. Colonel Robert Shaw was the White Boston commander who led the Regiment in their assault on Fort Wagner, South Carolina. Of the six hundred men who stormed the fort, 272, including Shaw, were killed, captured, or wounded. They were subsequently recognized for their courage and valor in battle.

Composed between c.1913 and c.1923 and revised in 1929, it is possible that initial sketches of this piece were penned as far back as May 1911, at the time of Ives's move to Hartsdale, New York. A distinguishing characteristic of the movement is its sophisticated handling of harmonic progressions, technically atonal though supporting a diatonic melody dominated by the interval of a minor third.

Ives referred to the piece as a brooding "Black March", inspired by a reflective experience at the monument. The piece evokes images of a long, slow march South to battle by the 54th. It achieves this with the use of minor third ostinatos in the bass. Ives uses chromaticism, placed distantly below the main themes, to make it sound like a vague recollection of the events rather than a vivid depiction.

The piece builds to a dynamic high before rapidly receding, perhaps to signify the fate of the regiment at Fort Wagner. From a full, rich C-major chord at measure 63 (rehearsal letter H), the music falls into minor disarray and, for the last 2 1/2 minutes, it can be heard as a solemn memorial to those lost or the crushed hopes of hundreds of black soldiers who had come to fight for the freedom of other black people.

==== Borrowing ====
Of particular significance is the main melody, which is made up of a patchwork of motives from old plantation tunes or parlor songs such as "Massa's in the Cold Ground" and "Old Black Joe", and the patriotic Civil War songs "Marching Through Georgia" and "The Battle Cry of Freedom". The paraphrasing of these pieces is especially clear in the opening bars of the piece, where motives from the three main sources interweave to create an American-sounding pentatonic melody typical of many 19th-century American songs.

Throughout the opening of the piece, ostinatos based upon minor third intervals are heard in the bass instruments. These are intended to evoke images of a solemn trudge down to battle. They, too, are derived from the same four source materials as the main melody. Throughout "Marching Through Georgia", "Old Black Joe", "The Battle Cry of Freedom" and "Massa's in the Cold Ground", minor third intervals predominate.

Ives chose these sources because of their musical similarities and the possibility of creating fresh, seamless motives from them. Furthermore, the pieces have strong extra-musical associations Ives used to full advantage. Mixing patriotic Civil War songs with old slave plantation songs created a vivid image honoring those who fell fighting for the emancipation of blacks during the Civil War.

Other borrowings in this first movement include "Reveille" and "Deep River".

=== II. Putnam’s Camp, Redding, Connecticut ===
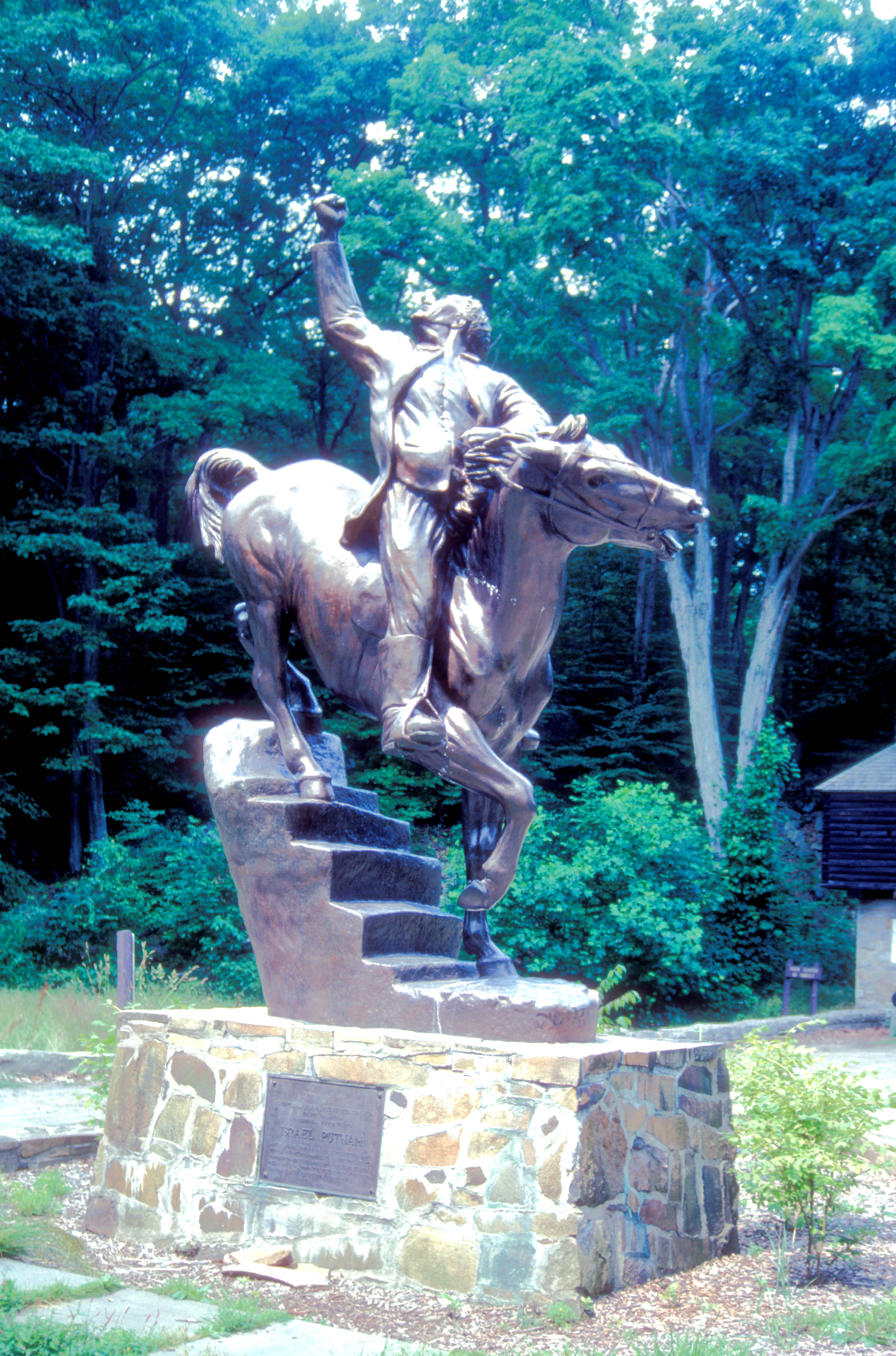
Statue of General Israel Putnam at the entrance to Putnam Memorial State Park

Derived from two earlier pieces, "Country Band March" and Overture & March: "1776" (both 1904), Putnam's Camp was finished in 1912. It is thought that working on his Fourth of July was an impetus for Ives here since he had just recently used the trio (or middle) section of 1776 in that work. A distinguishing characteristic of this movement is the combination of multiple divisions of the orchestra playing against each other while occasionally throwing in asymmetrical phrases or wild dissonances.

Putnam's Camp, near Redding, Connecticut, was established as a historic landmark by the Connecticut legislature in 1887 and named in honor of the American Revolutionary War General Israel Putnam, who set up a camp in the area during the winter of 1778–79. The site has been preserved as a historic treasure because of Putnam's important role in the Revolutionary War, especially the Battle of Bunker Hill. Fourth of July celebrations are often held at the site due to its historic significance.

Ives wrote a program into the score, describing the story:

Once upon a '4 July,' some time ago, so the story goes, a child went here on a picnic, held under the auspices of the First Church and the village cornet band. Wandering away from the rest of the children past the camp ground into the woods, he hopes to catch a glimpse of some of the old soldiers. As he rests on the hillside of laurels and hickories the tunes of the band and the songs of the children grow fainter and fainter; – when-"mirabile dictu"-- over the trees on the crest of the hill he sees a tall woman standing. She reminds him of a picture he has of the Goddess Liberty – but the face is sorrowful – she is pleading with the soldiers not to forget their "cause" and the great sacrifices they have made for it. But they march out of camp with fife and drum to a popular tune of the day. Suddenly, a new national note is heard. Putnam is coming over the hills from the center, – the soldiers turn back and cheer. – The little boy awakes, he hears the children's songs and runs down past the monument to "listen to the band" and join in the games and dances.

— Charles Ives, Three Places In New England Score.

James Sinclair, who was responsible for the work done in the 1970s to recreate the original score of Three Places, correlated many of the measures in the score for Putnam's Camp with this program. A picture has since been worked out which shows the measures of the piece along with their programmatic significance.

==== Borrowing ====
Ives borrowed extensively from American patriotic tunes to create the imagery of frantically patriotic Fourth of July celebrations. The opening measures are typical of Ives in their heavy chromaticism and varying time signatures (4/4 against 9/8) to create the sound of community marching bands. This touchingly realistic interpretation resolves shortly after the start of the piece into a B♭ major march, but chromaticism and disarray are never far from breaking through, giving the impression that the musicians in this band are only amateurs.

Ives also experimented with quoting famous musical excerpts in different keys from the main theme. This idea stems from an incident when Ives was listening to two different marching bands and could still hear one band marching away while the other was marching towards him, thus sounding like two pieces simultaneously played in two different keys.

Many American patriotic tunes, such as "Yankee Doodle" are quoted during the piece. In the last two measures of the piece, the national anthem resolves to an unexpected, dissonant chord.

Borrowed tunes include "The British Grenadiers", John Philip Sousa's "Semper Fidelis", "Liberty Bell" and "The Washington Post", Henry Clay Work's "Marching Through Georgia", "The Girl I Left Behind", "Arkansas Traveler", Stephen Foster's "Massa's in the Cold Ground", George Frederick Root's "The Battle Cry of Freedom" and "Tramp! Tramp! Tramp!", "Yankee Doodle", "London Bridge Is Falling Down", "Columbia, Gem of the Ocean", "Hail, Columbia", "The Irish Washerwoman", John Stafford Smith's "The Star-Spangled Banner" and Richard Wagner's "The Ride of the Valkyries".

=== III. The Housatonic at Stockbridge ===
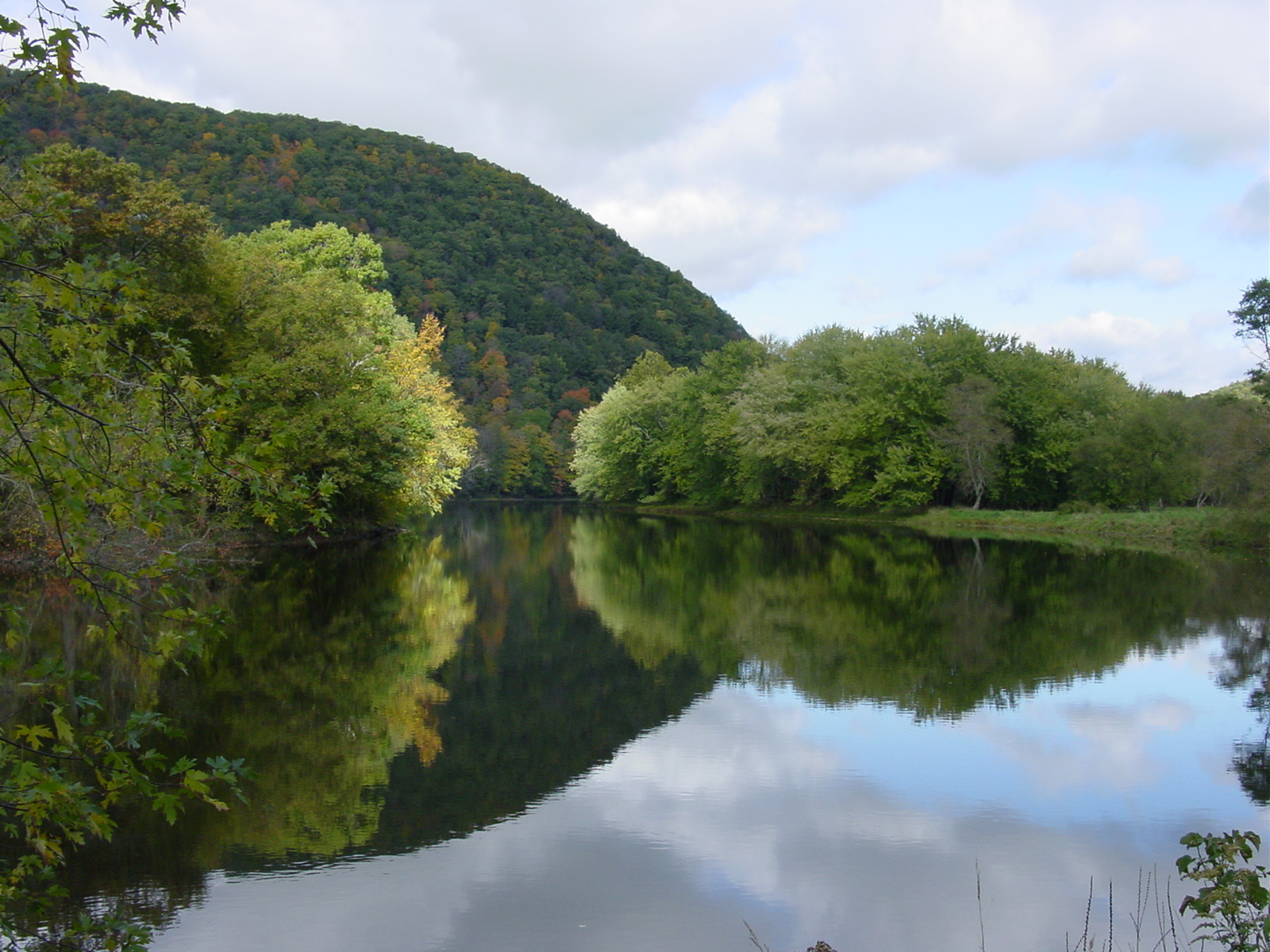
The Housatonic River, inspiration for the third movement of Three Places in New England

First drafts were written primarily in the summer of 1908, reworked in 1911 and then again in 1913, extending the atmospheric depiction of mists and running water far longer than the original first two measures. The scoring was completed in 1914. It was arranged as a song in 1921 to lines excerpted from Robert Underwood Johnson's poem To the Housatonic at Stockbridge, but this final movement of Three Places in New England is purely orchestral. It features strident polyrhythmic activity in the strings, coupled with a hymn tunes Isaac B. Woodbury's hymn tune "Dorrnance" and Charles Zeuner's "Missionary Chant".

This piece was inspired by a walk Ives had taken with his new wife, Harmony, in June 1908 on a honeymoon hiking trip in western Massachusetts and Connecticut, a rural setting they enjoyed so much that they chose to go back to the Berkshires the very next weekend. While there, they took a walk by the Housatonic River near Stockbridge, Massachusetts. Ives recalled,

We walked in the meadows along the river, and heard the distant singing from the church across the river. The mist had not entirely left the river bed, and the colors, the running water, the banks and elm trees were something that one would always remember.

Two days later, on 30 June 1908, Ives sketched some ideas to try to capture the atmosphere of this rustic scene. He used irregular, quasi-isorhythmic ostinatos in the violins to create the image of mist and fog rolling over swirling waters, and an English horn and violas to mimic the sound of singing from a church across the river.

==== Borrowing ====
Unlike the other pieces in this set, no American folk tunes are quoted in it. Instead, this piece exemplifies Ives' use of paraphrase of "Dorrance" (a hymn tune by Isaac B. Woodbury), and can thus be classed as an extended paraphrased melody using the following devices:

- Rhythmic alteration (mm. 7–9, 11–12).
- Omission (mm. 9–10, 12–13)
- Repetition (mm. 17–19)
- Transposition (third, fourth verses)
- Elision (a single note in Ives's melody takes the place of two notes in the source)
- Interpolation of new material
- Variation of previously paraphrased materials (mm. 35–36, 37–38 vary material paraphrased for m. 23)

"Missionary Chant" (a hymn tune by Charles Zeuner), begins in the same way as Dorrance except for an added note, which occasionally Ives adds to his paraphrased melody, suggesting that "Missionary Chant" may also be borrowed.

Ives recomposed this movement as an art song for a solo singer with piano accompaniment. The original symphonic version was purely instrumental, but conductor Michael Tilson Thomas took the liberty of adding a full choir to sing the "Dorrance"-based melody in place of the horns/woodwinds/lower strings when he rerecorded the work in 2002 with the San Francisco Symphony on the RCA label. This was likely inspired by performing Ives's Holiday Symphony, which originally did use a chorus at the end of the final movement.

== Sources ==
- John Kirkpatrick, "Charles Ives", in The New Grove Dictionary of Music and Musicians, ed. Stanley Sadie. 20 vol. London: Macmillan, 1980. ISBN 1-56159-174-2
- J. Peter Burkholder, James B. Sinclair, and Gayle Sherwood: "Charles Ives", Grove Music Online, ed. L. Macy (Accessed May 5, 2005, (subscription access)
- Program notes by Eric Salzman to CD Deutsche Grammophon CD 423243-2, Three Places in New England by Charles Ives, Boston Symphony Orchestra, Michael Tilson Thomas conducting.
- J. Peter Burkholder, All Made of Tunes. New Haven: Yale University Press, ISBN 0-300-05642-7
- H. Wiley Hitchcock, Ives: A Survey of the Music. London: Oxford University Press, ISBN 0-914678-21-3
- Robert P. Morgan, Twentieth-Century Music: A History of Musical Style in Modern Europe and America (Norton Introduction to Music History). New York: Norton, ISBN 0-393-95272-X
- Cooney, D. von Glahn, A Sense of Place: Charles Ives and "Putnam's Camp, Redding Connecticut" in American Music, Vol. 14, No. 3. (Autumn 1996), pp. 276–312.
- Ives, Three Places in New England, ed. James B. Sinclair (Score), Bryn Mawr, Mercury Music/ Theodore Presser.
- Clayton Henderson, The Charles Ives Tunebook (Michigan: Harmonie Park Press, 1990), 271
