= Oliver Schneller =

German composer and saxophonist (b.1966)

Oliver Martin Schneller (born 26 March 1966 in Cologne) is a German composer and saxophonist.

== Life ==
Schneller grew up in Ireland, Sudan, Belgium and the Philippines. After completing a MA in musicology, political science and history at the University of Bonn, he worked for the Goethe Institute in Kathmandu, Nepal (1990–91).

In 1994 he moved to the US, first studying composition at the New England Conservatory in Boston. From 2000–01 he lived in Paris attending a yearlong course at IRCAM/Centre Pompidou. In 2002 he received his doctoral degree in composition at Columbia University as a student of Tristan Murail, where he also taught composition and computer music as an assistant to Murail. During his time in New York Schneller developed and managed the Computer Music Studio at the Graduate Center of CUNY and taught harmony and counterpoint at Baruch College]. Master classes with Salvatore Sciarrino, Jonathan Harvey, Brian Ferneyhough, George Benjamin, and Vinko Globokar provided important orientations. From 2002 to 2004 he was compositeur en recherche at IRCAM working on Jardin des fleuves, a work for ensemble and live-electronic.

Schneller's music has been performed at international festivals such as Festival Agora Paris, Musica Strasbourg, Munich Biennale, MaerzMusik Berlin, Wittener Tage für neue Kammermusik, Ultraschall, Wien Modern, IFNM Darmstadt, Tremplins Paris, Les Musiques Marseille, musique action Nancy, Musica nova, Wintermusic Berlin, Karnatic Lab, Alternativa Moscow, the International Computer Music Conference, in Singapore and Göteborg, Musicaaoustica Beijing, Takefu Japan, Indaba, Aspen Music Festival and School, Tanglewood Music Festival, Frankfurt 2000, and the Millenium Stage Series at the Kennedy Center in Washington DC.

He was a visiting composer at the 2001 Festival of Contemporary Music at the University of Cincinnati Conservatory of Music, and a featured composer at Festival Résonances at IRCAM (2002).

His works have been performed by numerous ensembles including Ensemble modern, Ensemble InterContemporain, MusikFabrik, Ictus Ensemble, Avanti!, ensemble recherche, Speculum Musicae, Court Circuit, Ensemble Mosaik, Südwestrundfunk Orchestra, Kammerensemble Neue Musik Berlin, Ensemble Courage, Antares, the Tanglewood Symphony Orchestra, and St. Luke's Chamber Ensemble.

As a saxophonist, he has performed with the George Russell Big Band, the Gustav Mahler Youth Orchestra under Seiji Ozawa, with the Tanglewood Music Center Orchestra as a soloist in Tan Dun's "Red Forecast", as well as with musicians such as Steve Drury, Heather O'Donnell, Jiggs Whigham (Big Band), Bernhard Lang, Ned McGowan, Robin Hayward, Vinko Globokar, and Gert Matthias Wegner.

In 2004 he was the artistic director of the Tracing Migrations Festival in Berlin which led to the foundation of the Tracing Migrations Project, an ongoing documentation and permanently updated data base of contemporary compositions, recordings and newly founded music institutions from the Arab world. In this function he was a co-curator at Berlin's MaerzMusik Festival 2013.

In 2005 he was the curator of the project The Musical Moment at Berlin's House of World Cultures featuring composers Toshio Hosokawa and Helmut Lachenmann. From 2005–06 he was a guest lecturer and mentor in Cairo as part of the Global Interplay project of Musik der Jahrhunderte, Stuttgart. At Berlin University of the Arts he taught the seminar "Psychoacoustics and Acoustics for Composers".

Schneller is the artistic director of the SinusTon Festival for Experimental Music in Magdeburg which he co-founded with Carsten Gerth in 2008. In 2004, together with Jean-Luc Hervé and Thierry Blondeau, he formed the composers collective Biotope. Since 2009 he serves as sound arts curator of ha'atelier Platform for Philosophy and Art and Taswir Projects. His works have been recorded on Wergo, Mode, Hathut, Telos, and LJ Records.

From 2009–2010 Schneller held a professorship in composition at the State University of Music and Performing Arts Stuttgart as a sabbatical replacement for Prof. Marco Stroppa. From 2012–2015 he was a professor of composition at the Hochschule für Musik, Theater und Medien Hannover. In 2015 Schneller was appointed professor of composition and director of the Eastman Computer Music Center at the Eastman School of Music in Rochester. Since 2019 he is professor for composition at the Robert Schumann Hochschule Düsseldorf in Düsseldorf, where he currently resides with his wife, pianist Heather O'Donnell, and daughter.

== Awards ==
- 1984 First prize in Instrumental Performance of the Interscholastic Association of Southeast Asian Schools
- 1996 Robert Starer Prize
- 1998 the Boris Rapoport Award for Composition
- 1998 Meet The Composer Grant for Joyce Paraphrases
- 1998–2002 Presidential fellowship from Columbia University
- 1999 Commissioning Prize of the National Flute Association
- 1999 Benjamin Britten Memorial Fellowship, Tanglewood Music Center
- 2000 Paul Fromm Award Tanglewood Music Center/Harvard University
- 2002 Residency at the Maison-Heinrich-Heine in Paris
- 2004–05 Fellowship Bavarian Ministry of Science and Culture, Villa Concordia Bamberg
- 2006–07 Rome Prize Fellowship of the German Academy Villa Massimo
- 2010 Ernst von Siemens Composer Prize
- 2011 Fellowship Civitella Ranieri Foundation
- 2018 Edgar-Varèse-Guest Professorship at TU Berlin

== Selected works ==
=== Orchestral ===
- Gammes, full orchestra, 1995
- Tightrope Dancer, full orchestra, 1996
- Wu Xing/Fire, full orchestra, 2010
- Wu Xing/Metal, full orchestra, 2006–11
- Dreamspace, full orchestra and soloist ensemble, 2011
- Wu Xing/Water, full orchestra, 2013–14
- Tropes, full orchestra, 2014
- The New City. Hommmage to Lebeus Woods, full orchestra, 2020

=== Chamber music (1–4 players) ===
- Big City Divertimento, 4 saxophones, 1995
- Kumoijoshi, soprano saxophone, koto, 1995
- Hoqueterie, alto saxophone, tenor saxophone, guitar, percussion, 1996
- Marsyas, amplified flute, amplified cello, 1996
- Processional Suite, 2 guitars, 1996
- Five Miniatures after Maurice Sendak, French horn, trumpet, trombone, 1998
- Joyce Paraphrases, amplified string quartet, tape, 1998
- Trio, cello, piano, accordion, 1999
- Phantom Islands, (14 players) + electronics, 2000
- Topoi, clarinet, violin, cello, piano, 2000
- Soleil in memoriam Iannis Xenakis, flute, piano, 2001
- Twilight Dialogues, flute, clarinet, viola, percussion, 2005
- String Space, violin, viola, cello + electronics, 2005
- Resonant Space, 2 pianos, 2 percussion, 2007
- per maggior intreccio, flute, harpsichord, 2007
- Rugged Space, accordion, piano + electronics, 2009
- Die unendliche Feinheit des Raumes, organ, horn, tuba, percussion + electronics, 2005
- Vier Szenen, flute, percussion, piano, 2010
- Cyan, for two pianos and two percussions, 2011
- Rays, for trumpet and piano, 2022

=== Chamber music (5–22 players) ===
- Finnegain Speaking, 9 players, 1997
- Aqua Vit, 8 players, 1999
- Diastema, 14 players, 2001–02
- Jardin des fleuves, 16 players + electronics, 2002–04
- Clair/Obscur, 7 players + electronics, 2005–06
- Stratigraphie I, 6 players + electronics, 2007
- Musica ficta, 5 players + electronics, 2008
- Paysage sauvage, 4 players + electronics, 2009
- Stratigraphie II, 6 players + electronics, 2009–10
- Kagura, solo flute + 22 players, 2010–11
- Transatlantic Jukebox, piano and chamber orchestra, 2012
- Amber, two string quartets, 2011–12
- Alice Blue, for ensemble, 2014
- Superstructure, for six percussionists, 2014

=== Vocal ===
- Rice Pudding (text by A.A. Milne), speaker, piano, 1993
- Three Songs after Hopkins, Shelley and Meredith, soprano, piano, 1994
- Alice Setting (text by Lewis Carroll), soprano, mixed chorus, piano, percussion, string orchestra, 1997
- Pour Schnabelmax. Hommage à Max Ernst (text by the composer), 3 male voices, 1999
- Candidum lilium for vocal ensemble (SSTTB) + electronics, 2005
- Abendlied for voice, clavichord, violin, cello, 2009
- Monodie for voice and electronics, 2010
- Mugen for Noh voice and electronics, 2011
- Kireji for vocal ensemble and loudspeakers, 2015

=== Solo ===
- Vier Capricen, piano, 1989–90
- Sieben Bilder, piano, 1995
- Reed-Weed, alto saxophone, 1996
- Labyrinth, piano, 1996
- Aurora, piano, 1997
- Clouds, piano, 1998
- Five Imaginary Spaces, piano + electronics, 2001
- And Tomorrow, piano + electronics, 2004
- Turbulent Space, recorder + electronics, 2005
- Track & Field, piano, video + electronics, 2006–07
- Open Space, organ + electronics, 2011

=== Electroacoustic + Installation ===
- Variations on a Word, tape, 1997; Bell/Man, tape, 1998
- Proteus, tape, 1999
- Cell Cycle, for six channel audio + video, 2007
- La couleur du son, 4 channel audio-visual installation, 2005
- WuXing, five channel audio-visual installation, 2007
- Voice Space, six channel interactive audio-visual installation, 2007
- An Atlas of Sounds, 42 Channel audio-visual Installation, 2009–10

=== Collaborative works ===
- Trojan Lion, 5.1 Channel interactive sound installation with Peter Wyss, 2010
- Lichtkörper (2009): 4 Channel Sound Installation for suspended speakers with Alexander Polzin, 2009
- IO, 5.1 Channel Installation with Curtis Anderson, 2006
- Cento Correnti (2006) 20.1 Channel Sound Installation with Iris Dupper, 2006
- Ritratto Romano, Soundtrack to a video work of Christoph Brech, 2006
- Duets I–VII (2006–11): Soundtracks to seven video works of Eberli/Mantel, 2006–11
- Imperfect Enjoyment, Soundtrack to a video work of Almut Determeyer, 2004

=== Arrangements ===
- Sechs kleine Klavierstücke (Nos. 1, 2, 6), Op. 19 (Arnold Schoenberg), orchestra, 1989
- Zehn Märsche um den Sieg zu verfehlen (Nos. 5, 9) (Mauricio Kagel), orchestra, 1995
- All of Me, full orchestra, 2007
- My Funny Valentine, full orchestra, 2007
- "You're the Top", wind band, 2012

== Publications ==
- "Klänge einer Ausstellung . Anmerkungen zum kontrapunktischen Soundparcours von Taswir", in: TASWIR. Islamische Bildwelten und Moderne, Nicolai Verlag Berlin, 2009, pp. 133–137
- Akustisches Modell und komponierte Struktur, Institut für Neue Musik und Musikerziehung, Darmstadt 2008, Schott Verlag Mainz, 2009, pp. 183–189
- Sechs Werke von Sebastian Stier. Schott Verlag/WERGO Edition Zeitgenössische Musik (Deutscher Musikrat), Booklettext WER 6569 2 (2008)
- "Migration and Identity: Perspectives in Contemporary Arabic Music", Jahrbuch der Berliner Gesellschaft für Neue Musik, Pfau Verlag, 2006, pp. 127–139
- "HörRaum Stadt", Jahrbuch der Berliner Gesellschaft für Neue Musik 2003/2004, Pfau Verlag 2006, pp. 99–100
- "Raumklang-Klangraum: Über Pierre Boulez' Répons", Magazin der Berliner Philharmoniker, October 2005, pp. 38–40
- "Braucht die Neue Musik den Kammermusiksaal?", Bauwelt 8/05 (2005), pp. 26–27
- A Contemporary Response to Charles Ives in: Berliner Festspiele (Hg.), MaerzMusik. Festival für aktuelle Musik 2004, Saarbrücken (Pfau) 2004, pp. 146–153
- Klangschicht und Zeitharmonik. Begegnung mit Gottfried Michael Koenig, program booklet for the 3rd Magdeburg Concerts. Festtage zur Musikgeschichte Magdeburgs, October 2003
- Music und Raum, Research Commission from the House of World Cultures (HKW) Berlin 2003
- "Sonic Arts in Germany", M.I.T. Press, Computer Music Journal 26, 4 (Spring 2002), pp. 54–57
- "Chambres Séparées, KOMA, entrop, Zwischenwelten: Gerhard Winkler", M.I.T. Press, Computer Music Journal 25, 1 (2001): pp. 75–76
- "Material Matters", Current Musicology 67/68 (Winter 2002): pp. 156–174
- "IRCAM at Columbia 1999", Dossier d'Information IRCAM, No. 18 (October 2000), pp. 136–138)
- "Musik und Utopie", Universalmaschine, no. 2, Berlin (2001), pp. 68–70
- Donald Martino's Concerto for Alto Saxophone and Orchestra, CD-liner text New World Records, Recorded Anthology of American Music, No. 80529-2 (1998)

=== Translations (selection) ===
- "Helmut Lachenmann – Four Questions Regarding New Music", translated into English for Contemporary Music Review, vol. 23, no. 3/4 (September 2004)
- James Harley: "Sonic and Parametrical Entities in Tetras: An Analytical Approach to the Music of Iannis Xenakis", translated into German for Musiktexte 91 (December 2001)
- Neil Leonard (1994): "Kompromißlos und fortschrittlich. Juan Blanco: Kubas Pionier der Elektroakustischen Musik", translated into German for Musiktexte 96 (May 2003)
