= Mary Shipman Howard =

- Born: 1911
- Died: November 17, 1976 (aged 64–65)
- Occupation: Recording Engineer
- Years active: 1940-1955
- Known for: Earliest known female recording engineer

Mary Shipman Howard (1911–1976) was one of the earliest female recording engineers and recording studio owners. She was owner of Mary Howard Recordings studio and MHR label in New York City. She worked with Glenn Miller, Arturo Toscanini, and Charles Ives. After leaving the studio business, she remarried as Mary Howard Pickhardt and was a well-known breeder of pugs. She was also a respected judge of dog shows across the US.

== Recording engineer ==
Howard was a classically trained violist who started experimenting with sound recording in the late 1930s. She moved to New York in 1940 and applied for a sound engineer job at NBC. Women were not allowed in the NBC union at the time so she was hired as secretary. When NBC lost staff to the war, Mary was allowed in the union and started working as a recording engineer.

She started Mary Howard Recordings, a recording studio, in the building she lived in on east 49th Street. One of her clients was Charles Ives, who would spend entire days at the studio doing recordings for personal use. Some of these tracks were released as part of the album Ives Plays Ives.

In 1947, Howard started releasing her own commercial recordings under the MHR label. Artists included The Herman Chittison Trio, Ethel Waters, Lucille Turner and Dale Belmont. She closed the studio in 1955 when she grew tired of being in the city.

== Recording equipment ==
Some of the studio's recording equipment included Van Eps lathe, Allied Cutting lathe, Presto 1-D Heads, and Langevin 101-A Amplifiers.

== Dog breeder ==
She owned and operated Sabbaday Kennels in Washington, CT where she bred the Sabbaday line of pugs. She was recognized as a breeder who was "instrumental" in helping bring exposure to the pug breed and improving the quality.

=== Pug Dog Club of America ===
She was active with the Pug Dog Club of America and assumed roles on the board of directors. Two of her pugs won the Pug Dog Club of America Specialty Show three years in a row: Star Jade of North'boro in 1961, and Ch. Sabbaday Echo in 1962 and 1963.

Sylvia Sidney, who knew her personally, described Mary as "probably the best breeder and exhibitor of pugs on the Eastern seaboard.” Following her death, the Pug Dog Club of America wrote in tribute that she "was a tremendous supporter of all Pug clubs, an outstanding judge of Pugs and a woman of great courage.”
