= Emerson Concerto =

Unfinished draft by Charles Ives

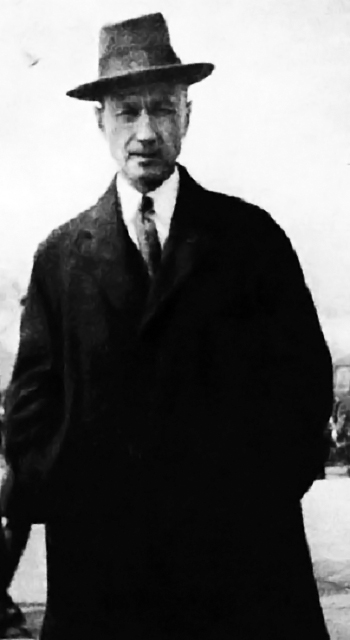
Charles Ives c. 1913

The "Emerson" Piano Concerto (also titled the "Emerson" Overture for Piano and Orchestra) was the unfinished draft of Charles Ives's Emerson movement of the Second Piano Sonata ("Concord, Mass. 1840–60"). Ives intended to convey his idea of Ralph Waldo Emerson.

The first version of the Sonata movement, completed around 1919 (although Ives stated in his "Memos" that it was actually "finished" in 1913), had many simplified passages, and omitted several passages that had been some of the "Centrifugal Cadenzas" of the Concerto (this version was published in 1921). These cadenza passages became "Studies" for piano. The passages that were retained in the Sonata movement that had been simplified were restored to their original state in the "Four Transcriptions from 'Emerson'" that were assembled between 1915 and c. 1923. When Ives recorded the Transcriptions in the 1930s, he restored most of these cadenza passages to the Transcriptions and one photostat copy of the Transcriptions ("Copy C") shows how they were to be reinstated in writing (cf. the CD Ives Plays Ives for his recordings).

Most of the more complex original text passages of the Sonata movement were restored to the Sonata in its second edition, in the 1940s. The Concerto was edited from all the extant sources: the existing Concerto sketches, the Sonata movement, the Studies, the Transcriptions, and verbal memoranda regarding the evolution of the music that Ives wrote as program notes to the Sonata movement. The manuscript sources for each have many verbal memoranda that refer back to the original idea of the Concerto, identifying materials for piano cadenzas, and for specific orchestral instruments.

The "viola part" to the Sonata movement is not to be played by a viola. It is simply "the viola part" from the last page of the original Concerto sketch (where it is doubled by bassoon, and the downbeats to each triplet figure are doubled by tubular bells). When Ives added the line back to the Sonata movement (in the copy of the Transcriptions made by copyist Reiss), in both pencil sketch and ink patch, he simply called it "viola part". Ives never intended it to be played by a viola. This is not the same as the optional flute part in the "Thoreau" movement, where a flute player is explicitly called for.
