= Piano Sonata No. 2 (Ives) =

20th century musical composition by Charles Ives

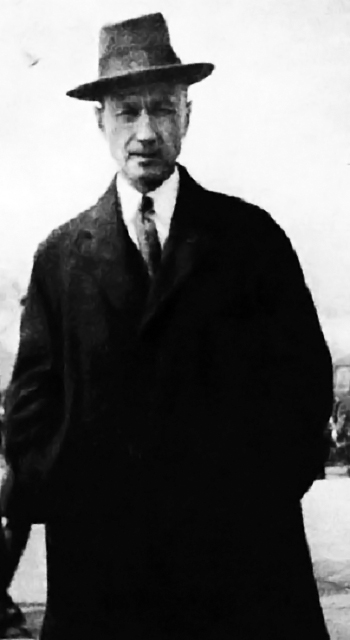
Charles Ives c. 1913

The Piano Sonata No. 2, Concord, Mass., 1840–60 (commonly known as the Concord Sonata) is a piano sonata by Charles Ives. It is one of the composer's best-known and most highly regarded pieces. A typical performance of the piece lasts around 45 minutes.

== History ==
I. Emerson

II. Hawthorne

III. The Alcotts

IV. Thoreau
Complete recording by Eric Xi Xin Liang

Some material in the Concord Sonata dates back as far as 1904, but Ives did not begin substantial work on it until around 1909 and largely completed the sonata by 1915. The Concord Sonata was first published in 1920 with a second, revised, edition appearing in 1947. It is this version which is usually performed today. In 2012, a reprint of the original, uncorrected 1920 edition was published, including Essays before a Sonata and with an added introductory essay by the New England Conservatory's Stephen Drury.

Ives recalled performing parts of the (then incomplete) sonata as early as 1912. However, the earliest known public performances of the sonata following its publication date back to October 1920, when author Henry Bellamann, who had been writing and lecturing about new music, persuaded pianist Lenore Purcell to tackle the work. According to Henry and Sidney Cowell, "she gave performances of it, usually one movement at a time, in conjunction with Bellamann's lectures, across the southern states from New Orleans to Spartanburg, South Carolina."

During the late 1920s, pianists including Katherine Heyman, Clifton Furness, E. Robert Schmitz, Oscar Ziegler, Anton Rovinsky, and Arthur Hardcastle performed various movements of the sonata. In the spring of 1927, John Kirkpatrick saw the score of the sonata on Heyman's piano in her Paris studio and was intrigued. He borrowed Heyman's copy and soon contacted Ives to request his own copy, which he promptly received. Kirkpatrick began learning and performing individual movements of the piece and engaged in regular correspondence with Ives; in 1934, he decided to learn the entire piece. Kirkpatrick met Ives in person for the first time in 1937, and by 1938, Kirkpatrick was playing the entire sonata, performing it for the first time at a private concert in Stamford, Connecticut. In a letter to Ives dated June 22, 1938, Kirkpatrick wrote: "Last night, in our little series here, we got to the American impressionists, and I trotted out the whole Concord Sonata — not yet from memory — but it was nice to feel its unity."

On November 28 of that year, Kirkpatrick performed the sonata in its entirety at a public concert in Cos Cob, Connecticut, and on January 20, 1939, he gave the sonata its New York premiere at Town Hall. Among those present was Elliott Carter, who reviewed the piece in the March–April 1939 edition of the journal Modern Music. The Cowells wrote that the premiere generated "a riot of enthusiasm," and stated that "the audience responded so warmly that one movement had to be repeated, and on 24 February, at a second Town Hall program that was devoted entirely to Ives, Mr. Kirkpatrick repeated the whole Sonata by popular request." Kirkpatrick proceeded to play the sonata in major cities around the United States.

== Music ==
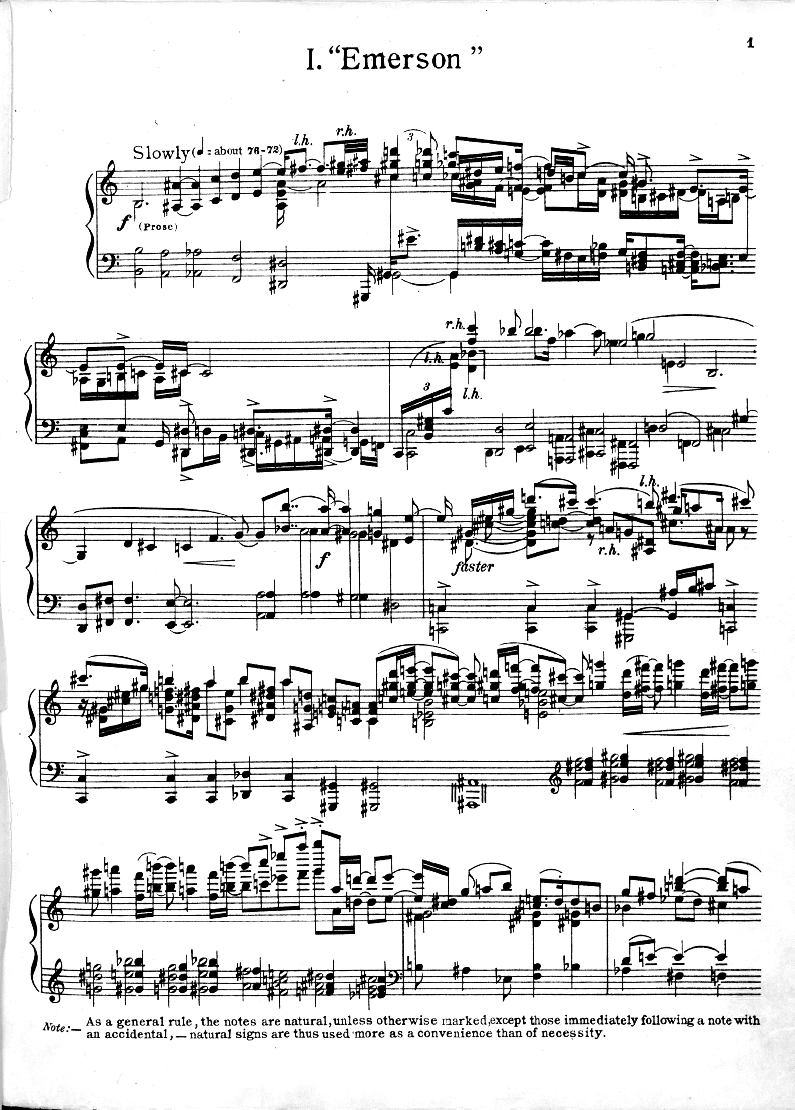
The beginning of the Concord Sonata, first edition

The sonata's four movements represent figures associated with transcendentalism. In the introduction to his Essays Before a Sonata (published immediately before the Concord Sonata, and serving as what Henry and Sidney Cowell called "an elaborate kind of program note (124 pages long)"), Ives said the work was his "impression of the spirit of transcendentalism that is associated in the minds of many with Concord, Massachusetts of over a half century ago. This is undertaken in impressionistic pictures of Emerson and Thoreau, a sketch of the Alcotts, and a scherzo supposed to reflect a lighter quality which is often found in the fantastic side of Hawthorne."

The four movements are:

1. "Emerson" (after Ralph Waldo Emerson)
2. "Hawthorne" (after Nathaniel Hawthorne)
3. "The Alcotts" (after Bronson Alcott and Louisa May Alcott)
4. "Thoreau" (after Henry David Thoreau)

The piece demonstrates Ives' experimental tendencies: much of it is written without barlines, the harmonies are advanced, and in the second movement, there are cluster chords created by depressing the piano's keys with a 14 3/4-inch (37 cm) piece of wood, as well as clusters marked "Better played by using the palm of the hand or the clenched fist." The piece also amply demonstrates Ives' fondness for musical quotation: the opening bars of Beethoven's Symphony No. 5 are quoted in each movement. James B. Sinclair's catalogue of Ives's works also notes less obvious quotations of Beethoven's Hammerklavier Sonata as well as quotations from Debussy and Wagner. Unusually for a piano sonata, there are optional parts for other instruments: near the end of the first movement there is an optional part for viola, and in the last movement a flute (an instrument which Thoreau played) briefly appears.

In a conversation with Ives, Elliott Carter wrote:

[Carter] asked why the notation of the Concord Sonata was so vague, why every time he played it, he did something different, sometimes changing the harmonies, the dynamic scheme, the degree of dissonance, the pace... He said that he intended to give only a general indication to the pianist, who should, in his turn, recreate the work for himself... This improvisational attitude toward music... affects all of Ives's more mature works... In his compositions, the notation of a work is only the basis for further improvisation, and the notation itself... is a kind of snapshot of the way he played it at a certain period in his life.

Tom C. Owens, the editor of Selected Correspondence of Charles Ives, noted that, for Ives, the sonata was "elusive and ephemeral", and wrote:

Although he was very much interested in producing a sound and error-free edition that would best represent his understanding of the piece, he was reluctant ever to say that any one version had achieved that goal. Ives's performance of the work reflected an ideal that could exist only within his mind. And this ideal form changed with time and context as a landscape changes with the position of the sun and the time of year or as one's interpretation of an essay changes with one's mood and experience.

Regarding the "Emerson" movement, Ives wrote: "I find that I do not play or feel like playing this music even now in the same way each time... Some of the passages now played have not been written out, and I do not know as I ever shall write them out as it may take away the daily pleasure of playing this music and seeing it grow and feeling that it is not finished and the hope that it never will be – I may always have the pleasure of not finishing it." In a letter to John Kirkpatrick, Harmony Ives wrote the following on behalf of her husband: "it depends sometimes, on the time of day it is played heard — at sunrise that wide chord — and at sunset maybe with an overtone, towards a star. He has felt that some music, like a landscape, though fundamentally the same, may have changing colors during a cosmic horizon, and as you know the oak tree in May doesn't always play the same tune way that it plays (shouts out) in October."

Essays Before a Sonata, written by Ives and published in 1920 to explain the sonata to listeners

Commenting on the sections without barlines, Henry and Sidney Cowell wrote:

This is a prose concept of rhythm; it is also related to the idea that different stresses may be given by different performers, all of them right... [U]sually one feels that Ives hopes to induce the performer not to be too bound by any one way of organizing strong and weak beats, playing the passages now one way, now another. Ives's whole approach to his complex rhythms should be understood as an attempt to persuade players away from the strait-jacket of regular beats, with which complete exactness is impossible anyhow, and to induce them to play with rubato in the involved places, with a freedom that creates the impression of a sidewalk crowded with individuals who move forward with a variety of rhythmic tensions and muscular stresses that make constant slight changes of pace. In fact, Ives has often expressed regret at having to write out a piece at all, since its rhythms will then be hopelessly crystallized.

John Kirkpatrick compared aspects of Ives's sonata, particularly "Emerson", to Ives's own prose writing, noting "the way his sentences spin out and are a little bit reluctant to close. They qualify the thoughts and even counterqualify them. The ideas tumble in on one another, and they make a kind of magnificent soaring ascent." The "prose" sections of music described by the Cowells caused difficulties for Kirkpatrick, who stated that he didn't have "the kind of musical intelligence that could swim around in this kind of prose rhythm with no bar lines at all. I had to explain to myself very clearly just where all the main first beats were... so that I could act freely in respect to them." Nevertheless, Kirkpatrick maintained a certain degree of interpretational flexibility and openness in relation to Ives's music, specifically with regard to Ives's numerous revisions, stating "In playing it I use some of the old and some of the new in varying degrees. Practically every time I take it up again, I see some of these choices in different lights, and everything changes slightly."

== Recordings and other uses ==
The piece has been recorded on a number of occasions, first by John Kirkpatrick in 1945 (released on Columbia Records in 1948, and a best-seller for several months). Ives himself made a complete recording of "The Alcotts" and excerpts of the first two movements; these and other recordings of Ives playing his own compositions were released by CRI in 1999 as Ives Plays Ives. Other exponents of the work include Nina Deutsch, Gilbert Kalish, Easley Blackwood, Pierre-Laurent Aimard, Stephen Drury, Marc-André Hamelin, Heather O'Donnell, Herbert Henck, Alan Feinberg, Richard Aaker Trythall, Phillip Bush, Roberto Szidon and most recently Jeremy Denk, Alan Mandel, James Drury, Ian Pace, and Melinda Smashey Jones. Martin Perry plays the final edition made by John Kirkpatrick in the 1980s.

In 1986, Bruce Hornsby borrowed the opening phrase of "The Alcotts" as the introduction to his song "Every Little Kiss" from the album The Way It Is. In an interview, Hornsby stated: "Charles Ives was a huge favorite of mine and still is. In fact, I almost got sued: one of my first singles, 'Every Little Kiss,' had an intro that was sort of an homage to Ives. I was basically paraphrasing the third movement of his Concord Sonata..."

In 1996, Henry Brant arranged the work for orchestra as A Concord Symphony.

Merlin Patterson transcribed the sonata for large symphonic wind ensemble.
