= Constance Keene =

American pianist (1921–2005)

Constance Keene (9 February 1921 – 24 December 2005) was an American pianist, who was renowned for her 1964 recording of Sergei Rachmaninoff's Preludes and won critical acclaim for her recordings of the works of Johann Nepomuk Hummel, Carl Maria von Weber and Felix Mendelssohn, as well as Rachmaninoff's Études-Tableaux, Op. 33 and Études-Tableaux, Op. 39.

She was raised in Brooklyn, New York City. One of her teachers was Abram Chasins. She won the Naumburg Piano Competition in 1943. In 1946, she stood in for Vladimir Horowitz when he was unavailable for a concert, and she asserted that she was the only female pianist ever to have been given this honor. She also appeared with Benny Goodman and his orchestra in a performance of Gershwin's Rhapsody in Blue. In 1949 she married Chasins, who died in 1987. They performed and recorded music for piano duo.

Through her husband, who had himself studied with pianist Josef Hofmann, she met other concert pianists, including Vladimir Horowitz. She and Chasins regularly socialized and played bridge with Horowitz and his wife Wanda Toscanini Horowitz during Horowitz's 12-year retirement from the concert stage. As a teen she met Hofmann, Godowsky, and Rachmaninoff; as an adult she and Chasins helped Van Cliburn before his rise to fame. She was close to William Kapell, Abbey Simon, and other pianists. Later in life she often hosted rising young pianists such as Evgeny Kissin and Lang Lang at her Upper West Side home.

She later became an accomplished teacher herself. Her pupils included the children of Arthur Rubinstein, who said of her performances of Rachmaninoff's Preludes that he was "flabbergasted by the colour, sweep and imagination and ... incredible technique. I cannot imagine anybody, including Rachmaninoff, playing the piano so beautifully".

Pianist Peter Nero was one of Constance's pupils as a young man. Despite being a prodigy and winning piano contests in the New York City area, when he started studying with her, Mr. Nero claimed, "She changed my whole life" in regards to piano technique. "I owe it all to Constance", he claimed in later life.

Composer B. J. Rosco, among others, also studied with Keene.

For many years, she was on the faculty of the Manhattan School of Music, served as the chair of the Piano Department, and was a member of its board of trustees. She was also sought out as a piano competition adjudicator.
