= Ives Plays Ives =

Ives Plays Ives: The Complete Recordings of Charles Ives at the Piano

Studio album by Charles Ives
- Released: 1999; 2006
- Recorded: 1933–1943
- Studios: London; New York City
- Genre: Classical music
- Length: 1:17:57
- Labels: CRI; CD 810; New World Records; 80642
- Producer: James Sinclair

Ives Plays Ives: The Complete Recordings of Charles Ives at the Piano is an album consisting of recordings, made during the years 1933–1943, of composer Charles Ives playing his own music.

== Background ==
By 1933, the year of the first recording session, Ives had nearly completed work on his autobiographical Memos and had retired from the insurance business. He had heard some (mostly disappointing) performances of his instrumental music, but none of his piano compositions. While on vacation in Europe, he decided to visit a recording studio for the first time with the goal of being able to hear and evaluate his music in a detached way. Recording engineer Mary Shipman Howard would later recall that, in addition, Ives "got letters from conductors and performers who were going to play something asking how they should interpret the music", to which he responded: "Interpret, interpret! What are they talking about? If they don't know anything about music—well, all right, I'll tell them."

== Recording sessions ==
Ives entered the recording studio on four occasions. On June 12, 1933, he recorded four short tracks on shellac discs at the Columbia Graphophone Company in London. At some point during the mid-1930s, he recorded additional tracks on aluminum Speak-O-Phone discs at a studio in New York City. On May 11, 1938, he visited the Melotone Recording Co. in New York City, where he recorded on lacquer-coated discs, and on April 24, 1943, he recorded his final session at the studio of Mary Shipman Howard, again on lacquer-coated discs.

Recording media of the time were limited to five minutes per side. On some of the recordings, Ives can be heard groaning and muttering "I have to stop", "oh, no, I can't", and other complaints. In an entry in his Memos dated June 12, 1933, the composer railed against the constraints imposed by the studio:

A bell rings... and a nice red light starts—and you start. You get going, going good maybe the first time... Then the nice engineer comes back and says... the last part was not recorded. As I remember, the last part was the only part of the above "going good" part.

He pondered: "Now what has all this got to do with music?... A man may play to himself and his music starts to live—then he tries to put it under a machine, and it's dead!"

Mary Shipman Howard recalled:

Ives was absolutely full of beans and it wasn't bad temper. It was just excitement. I remember that he sang one phrase from the Concord Sonata over and over. "Now do you get that?"—and he'd pound and pound and Mrs. Ives would say, "Now, please take a rest." He drank quantities of iced tea, and he'd calm down and then go back at it again, saying, "I've got to make them understand."

== Music ==
Most of the tracks are related to the "Emerson" movement of the Concord Sonata, and proved useful in the reconstruction of the Emerson Concerto. However, Ives also recorded sections of the "Hawthorne" movement of the Sonata, and "The Alcotts" in its entirety, as well as excerpts from his Studies for piano and his First Symphony, plus a raucous version of the song "They Are There!" with Ives singing in a tone that has been described as "bellowing or manic ranting". Much of the music has an improvisational character, which is in line with Elliott Carter's observation that, in Ives's compositions, "the notation... is only the basis for further improvisation, and the notation itself... is a kind of snapshot of the way he played it at a certain period in his life."

== Release ==
Tapes of the music are held in the Historical Sound Recordings Collection at the Yale University Music Library. Some of the tracks were initially released on vinyl in 1974 as part of a Columbia Masterworks 5-LP box set titled Charles Ives: The 100th Anniversary. In 1999, CRI issued all the available tracks on CD with pitch-correction and the removal of skips, after which, following CRI's demise, they were reissued in remastered form by New World Records in 2006.

== Reception ==
Professional ratings
Review scores
Source	Rating
AllMusic	4/5 stars

In an article for The New York Times, Kyle Gann called the album "42 tracks of raucous, chaotic, fearless, determined pianism" that portray "Ives as an amazingly, though not consistently, energetic elderly man with a virtuosic if idiosyncratic piano technique". He asked: "Who knew that this crusty, eccentric, rapidly ageing man banging away at the piano and muttering under his breath would one day be hailed as the greatest American composer?"

Writing for American Music, David Nicholls commented: "In his centrifugal, varied iterations of the same musical ideas (whether performed, notated, or both), Ives (knowingly or unknowingly) purposefully reminds us of a time when notation served as an aid to memory rather than a precise prescription of action." He concluded by stating that the album "encourages us all to rise to the aural challenges posed by Ives's remarkable recorded legacy".

Frank Cooper, reviewing the 1974 release, called the recording "the most important piece of documentation in the history of American music", and expressed the opinion that none of the well-known interpreters of Ives's music "has matched this combination of purely musical tone, cantabile phrasing and rhythmic ease".

AllMusic's Uncle Dave Lewis wrote: "if there is any characteristic that dominates the proceedings as a whole it is Ives' thundering, highly dissonant, and exploratory pianism, frequently peppered with moans, epithets, and cursing. It is a little like going through Ives' hastily scribbled manuscript sketches, only on record rather than on paper."

Peter Gutmann of Classical Notes remarked: "Its significance extends far beyond its unassuming title. It is, quite simply, the most direct introduction to one of the greatest composers of any age. Be forewarned, though – this is not a disc to enjoy in a conventional sense... Rather, it's a wild, untamed glimpse into the Ives workshop, and a rather messy one at that."

A reviewer for ClassicsToday.com called the album "a revelatory treasure" and "an essential issue", and state, "Iit would be hard to find performances more alive than these, which reveal just what a loony genius Ives was at the piano... While most pianists approach Ives' scores as if they're trying to sort them out according to a logical plan, the composer proves that his music can sound just as chaotic as his manuscripts look."

== Track listing ==
June 12, 1933

1. "Four Transcriptions from 'Emerson', No. 1 (Beg.)" – 3:58
2. "Four Transcriptions from 'Emerson', No. 1 (End)" – 1:28
3. "Four Transcriptions from 'Emerson', No. 3" – 2:33
4. "Improvisation on a Passage in Study No. 23, Four Transcriptions from 'Emerson', No. 2, and Emerson Overture's Cadenza No. 4 (With False Start)" – 0:44

Mid 1930s

5. "Four Transcriptions from 'Emerson', No. 1 (Beg.)" – 2:14
6. "Four Transcriptions from 'Emerson', No. 1 (End)" – 2:24
7. "Study No. 11 (Abandoned)" – 0:50
8. "Study No. 11" – 1:34
9. "Study No. 11" – 1:33
10. "Patch for Study No. 23" – 0:40
11. "Four Transcriptions from 'Emerson', No. 1 (Beg.)" – 2:57
12. "Four Transcriptions from 'Emerson', No. 1 (End)" – 2:53
13. "Four Transcriptions from 'Emerson', No. 3" – 3:33
14. "Four Transcriptions from 'Emerson', No. 3" – 3:40

May 11, 1938

15. "Four Transcriptions from 'Emerson', No. 3 (Beg.)" – 1:53
16. "Four Transcriptions from 'Emerson', No. 3 (End)" – 0:47
17. "Study No. 11" – 1:02
18. "Study No. 9: The Anti-Abolitionist Riots" – 2:04
19. "Study No. 2 with False Start" – 1:31
20. "Study No. 2 (Beg.)" – 0:49
21. "Study No. 2 (End)" – 1:15
22. "Study No. 23 (Partial)" – 1:00
23. "Four Transcriptions from 'Emerson', No. 1 (Abandoned)" – 0:17
24. "Four Transcriptions from 'Emerson', No. 1 (Middle)" – 1:04
25. "Study No. 23 (Partial)" – 1:10
26. "Three Improvisations, No. 1" – 0:50
27. "Sonata No. 2 for Piano: Concord, Mass., 'Hawthorne' (Excerpt)" – 0:17
28. "Symphony No. 1 / Rejected Mvt. 2 (Largo)" – 1:58
29. "Unidentified (Improvisation on the 'Sunrise Cadenza'?)" – 0:21
30. "Study No. 20 (Partial)" – 0:32
31. "Three Improvisations, No. 3" – 0:42

April 24, 1943

32. "Sonata No. 2 for Piano: Concord, Mass., 'Emerson' (Partial)" – 2:05
33. "Sonata No. 2 for Piano: Concord, Mass., 'Emerson' (Partial)" – 1:23
34. "Sonata No. 2 for Piano: Concord, Mass., 'Emerson' (Partial)" – 4:02
35. "Study No. 2 + Study No. 23 (Mixed)" – 2:24
36. "Four Transcriptions from 'Emerson', No. 3 (Abandoned)" – 0:57
37. "Study No. 9: The Anti-Abolitionist Riots" – 2:15
38. "They Are There!, First Take (Abandoned)" – 1:59
39. "They Are There!, Second Take" – 3:30
40. "They Are There!, Third Take" – 2:44
41. "March No. 6 for Piano, with 'Here's to Good Old Yale'" – 2:09
42. "Sonata No. 2 for Piano: Concord, Mass., 'The Alcotts'" – 5:02

== Personnel ==
- Charles Ives – piano, voice
