= B. J. Rosco =

American composer and pianist (1932–2019)

B. Jeanie Groh Stoner Bumpus (November 27, 1932 – June 3, 2019) was an American composer, pianist and teacher who published under the name B. J. Rosco.

== Life and career ==
Rosco was born in Wilbur, Washington, on November 27, 1932. She studied piano and composition at the Juilliard School, the University of Washington, Whitworth College, and Washington State University. Her teachers included Erwin Freundlich, Randolf Holkanson, Constance Keene, Dr. Loran Olsen, and Margaret Saunders Ott.

She was the Washington State Music Teachers Association (WSMTA) 2004 Composer of the Year. In addition to the WSMTA, she received commissions from Clavier magazine, the Joanna Hodges Summer Piano Seminar, and the Southwestern Youth Music Festival.

A versatile composer, Rosco is best known for her piano pedagogy compositions. Her multi-volume “Images” series represents the musical styles of many eras, and includes a brief history of each era and a list of its important composers. She also studied 20th century composition techniques in order to incorporate them in her piano teaching pieces and introduce students to contemporary music.

Rosco's music is published by Alfred Music and Carl Fischer Music.

Rosco died in Renton, Washington, on June 3, 2019, at the age of 86.

== Chamber ==
- Five Pieces (brass quartet)

== Orchestra ==
- Youth Concerto “A Festival” (piano and orchestra)

== Piano ==
- many pedagogical pieces
- Escapades
- Images (multi-volume series)
- Miniature Concerto for Piano (2 pianos)
- Spectrums
- Three Dimensions
- Tone Poem
- Whimseys

== Vocal ==
- High Mass
