= Margaret Saunders Ott =

American pianist and teacher

Margaret Saunders Ott (July 18, 1920, in Mt. Hope, WA – June 8, 2010, in Spokane, WA) was a distinguished American pianist and teacher. Her career included teaching positions at Lebanon Valley Conservatory (PA), Bishop School (CA), Washington State University (WA), Gonzaga University (WA), Payap University (Thailand), and most notably, Whitworth College (WA), where she taught for 25 years and was chair of the piano department.

After graduating from Mills College (CA), she attended the Juilliard School (NY), where she studied with Moriz Rosenthal, Sasha Gorodnitzky, and Olga Samaroff Stokowski. She later became Madame Samaroff's assistant, traveling with her to Los Angeles.

With the blessing of Madame Samaroff, Margaret (better known as "Margie May") returned to the Pacific Northwest to marry Franklin Ott, raise a family, and to teach and perform. Over the years she guided many outstanding pianists and piano teachers, among them Philip Aaberg, Nancy O'Neill Breth, Susan Brown, Deborah Dewey, Stephen Drury, Jody Graves, Donald Manildi, Ricklen Nobis, Greg Presley, Mary Simpson, Scott Rednour, B. J. Rosco, and Greg Slag. In recognition of her achievements, she was awarded the Teacher of the Year Award by the Music Teachers National Association in 2003.

Her students included Joseph Klice, as well as many other pianists and musicians.
