= John Kirkpatrick (pianist) =

American classical pianist and music scholar

- Born: March 18, 1905; New York City
- Died: November 8, 1991 (aged 86); Ithaca, New York
- Occupations: Classical pianist and music scholar

John Kirkpatrick (18 March 1905 – 8 November 1991) was an American classical pianist and music scholar, best known for championing the works of Charles Ives, Aaron Copland, Carl Ruggles, and Roy Harris. He gave the first complete public performance of Ives's Concord Sonata in 1939, which became a turning point in the composer's public recognition. Kirkpatrick played an important role in Ives scholarship, and he was leader in the Charles Ives Society. One important example is his role in the editing of Memos, which is a collection of Ives's autobiographical writings. At the time of his death Kirkpatrick was a professor emeritus at Yale University, where he had also been the curator of the Charles Ives archives.

== Life and career ==
=== Early years ===
Kirkpatrick was born on 18 March 1905 to John and Marguerite (née Haviland) Kirkpatrick in New York City, where his father had a jewelry business. He was educated at Lawrenceville School before entering Princeton University in 1922 where he studied classics and then art history. (At the time, Princeton did not have a music department.) In the summer of 1925 he traveled to France to study piano under Nadia Boulanger at The American Conservatory in Fontainebleau. He returned to Princeton for his final year but abandoned his studies in February 1926 to return to France. He would remain there for the next five years, attending the École normale de musique de Paris and studying piano with Boulanger, Camille Decreus, and Isidor Philipp at Fontainebleau and Louta Nouneberg in Paris. Kirkpatrick returned to the United States in 1931, living at first in Greenwich Village and supporting himself by teaching piano. He and Aaron Copland had been fellow students at Fontainebleau, and on his return Kirkpatrick became part of the composer's artistic circle. He performed at the first Festival of Contemporary Music, organized by Copland at the Yaddo artists' colony in 1932 and went on to perform at Yaddo for the next 20 years, playing new works by Copland, Charles Ives, Robert Palmer, and Carl Ruggles.

=== The Concord Sonata ===
Throughout the 1930s, and in addition to his performances at Yaddo, Kirkpatrick gave many recitals and lecture-recitals of 20th-century American composers' works, many of them world premieres. The most significant of these was on 20 January 1939, when he gave the first complete public performance of Charles Ives's Concord Sonata at Town Hall in New York City, playing the notoriously difficult and idiosyncratic piece entirely from memory. Before the New York premiere, Kirkpatrick had tried out a complete performance at a semi-private lecture-recital in Cos Cob, Connecticut (also playing from memory). Paul Rosenfeld had written a favourable review of the Cos Cob performance in the journal Modern Music. Elliott Carter's was more mixed, but neither was widely circulated outside the relatively narrow readership of the journal. However, the New York performance marked the first time that Ives's work was reviewed by a prominent critic in the mainstream press, Lawrence Gilman of the New York Herald-Tribune. Gilman was unstinting in his praise of Ives, writing:

This sonata is exceptionally great music—it is, indeed, the greatest music composed by an American, and the most deeply and essentially American in impulse and implication.

When Kirkpatrick gave a further performance of the sonata at the Town Hall the following month, it was reviewed by multiple mainstream publications, including Time, The New York Sun, and The New Yorker. It marked a turning point in the public recognition of Ives and his works. It also marked a turning point in Kirkpatrick's own career, much of which was subsequently devoted to collaborating with Ives and documenting his work. Over his entire career, Kirkpatrick made two recordings, five editions, and hundreds of performances of the Concord Sonata.

=== Marriage and the Cornell years ===
In January 1940 Kirkpatrick met his future wife, the soprano Hope Miller, when he was engaged to replace her accompanist for a recital tour. The couple married in June of that year and in the early years of their marriage continued to give joint recitals. One of the most notable of these took place January 1943 at Town Hall in New York, when they gave the New York premieres of Aaron Copland's Piano Sonata and Roy Harris's "Cradle' Song" juxtaposed with works by Purcell, Bach and Beethoven. The recital was reviewed by Virgil Thomson in the New York Herald Tribune who wrote:

The beauty and variety of tone, the impeccable mechanism, and the noble, architectonic conception were great pianism and great musicianship. It is not customary to compare the work of local artists favorably with that of the foreign-born great, but I cannot refrain from doing so in this case, because it seemed to me that Mr. Kirkpatrick was playing the piano as it is not often played by anybody.

From 1942 until 1943 Kirkpatrick was the head of the music department at Monticello College in Illinois (now Lewis and Clark Community College). He then served as an associate professor at Mt. Holyoke College until 1946 when he joined the faculty in the music department of Cornell University. He remained at Cornell until 1968, serving as the head of the music department from 1949 until 1953 and becoming a full professor in 1950. During his time there, he also continued his musical career, conducting the Sage Chapel Choir, (which he led from 1953 to 1957), in a performance of Arthur Honegger's Le roi David in a translation and arrangement by Kirkpatrick, giving recitals, and making several recordings of works by Charles Ives and other 20th-century American composers, including the premiere recordings of Ives's Concord Sonata and Carl Ruggles's Evocations.

== Discography ==
Below is a list of John Kirkpatrick's recordings. They were all released as LP records. However, some of these recordings (or excerpts from them) appear on CD, including Songs of Charles Ives and Ernst Bacon (CRI, 2007), Charles Ives: Five Violin Sonatas (Musical Heritage Society, 2009), and Complete Music of Carl Ruggles (Other Minds Records, 2012).

- Charles Ives: Concord Sonata (premiere recording); Columbia Records, 1948
- Hunter Johnson: Letter to the World, with the Concert Hall Chamber Orchestra conducted by Robert Hull; Concert Hall Society, 195? (recorded 1948)
- Edward MacDowell: Woodland Sketches, Sea Pieces, Fireside Tales & New England Idyls; Columbia Records, 1951
- Hunter Johnson: Concerto for Piano and Chamber Orchestra, with the Rochester Chamber Orchestra conducted by Robert Hull; Concert Hall Society, 1954
- Robert Palmer: Quartet for piano and strings, with the Walden Trio; Columbia Records, 1954
- Carl Ruggles: Evocations (premiere recording); Columbia Records, 1955
- Charles Ives: 24 Songs, with Helen Boatwright (soprano); Overtone Records, 1955
- Henry Cowell: Toccanta, with Carleton Sprague Smith (flute), Helen Boatwright (soprano), and Aldo Parisot (cello); Columbia Records, 1955
- Charles Ives: Concord Sonata (second recording and winner of an Edison Award in 1970); Columbia Records, 1968
- Louis Moreau Gottschalk: Danza, O ma charmante, Suis-mois, El Cocoyé; Turnabout Records, 1971 (recorded live at the Pan American Union, Washington, DC, 17 December 1969)
- Charles Ives: 25 Songs, with Helen Boatwright (soprano); Columbia Records, 1974 (recorded 1969)
- Carl Ruggles: Evocations (second recording); CBS Masterworks, 1980 (recorded 1977)
- Charles Ives: Five Violin Sonatas, with Daniel Stepner (violin); Musical Heritage Society, 1982

== Selected publications ==
- "Aaron Copland's Piano Sonata". Modern Music, Vol. 18, No. 4, (May–June 1942)
- "Performance as an Avenue to Educational Realities in Music", College Music Symposium, Vol. 4, (Fall 1964)
- "The Evolution of Carl Ruggles: A Chronicle Largely in His Own Words". Perspectives of New Music, Vol. 6, No. 2, (Spring–Summer 1968)
- Eleven Songs & Two Harmonizations by Charles Ives, score edited by John Kirkpatrick with preface and notes on each song. New York: Associated Music Publishers (1968)
- Memos by Charles Ives, edited and annotated by John Kirkpatrick. New York: Norton (1972).
- "Charles Ives" in John Kirkpatrick (ed.) The New Grove Twentieth-Century American Masters: Ives, Thomson, Sessions, Cowell, Gershwin, Copland, Carter, Barber, Cage, Bernstein. New York: Norton (1987)
