= Calcium Light Night =

Calcium Light Night is a piece of music by American composer Charles Ives. It is one of his Cartoons or Take-Offs and is scored for piccolo, clarinet, cornet, trombone, bass drum, and two pianos (four players). (Ives suggested in a memo in the manuscript that this instrumentation can be expanded by using extra instruments.) In 1912 or 1913, Ives grouped Calcium Light Night with five other pieces to make Set No. 1 for chamber ensemble. The piece pictures an event that occurs on the campus of Yale University that is well-described by W. E. Decrow in his book, Yale and the "City of Elms".

"Delta Kappa Epsilon, ... like its rival, Psi Upsilon, chooses about forty members from each junior class and gives out its elections in precisely the way stated in the article describing Psi Upsilon hall ..." "Psi Upsilon at Yale is a junior society, and about forty members of every junior class are elected to membership in the organization. Meetings are held on the Tuesday evenings in term time, and the elections are given out two or three weeks before Commencement. On that occasion the members form in line two deep, and, preceded by a calcium light borne on a wooden frame by four members of the society, march around to and visit various rooms, in each of which a certain number of men pledged to join the society are awaiting their coming. The procession files through the room, each member shaking hands with each candidate, and receiving, on marching out again, two or three fine cigars, presented by the newly elected members. The other junior society, Delta Kappa Epsilon, is always out on the same mission, under precisely similar circumstances. Accident or design, or both, always cause the two processions to pass each other several times during the evening, and each, singing its own society song, attempts to the best of its ability to drown the voices of the other. It is always done with the utmost good nature, and both sides enjoy it heartily, as do the numerous spectators ..."

The main themes of the piece are the society tunes "And again we sing thy praises, Psi U., Psi U.!" and "A band of brothers in D.K.E., we march along tonight." The tunes begin quietly and slowly and build to a raucous climax as the two groups of students cross each other's paths, and then retreat back to the way they began in a sort of leap-frog retrogression.

The Danish danseur and choreographer Peter Martins used this score to mark his choreographic debut with the New York City Ballet. It first premiered in Seattle, Washington in 1977 as part of a concert touring engagement organized by Martins while he was still a Principal Dancer with the New York City Ballet. The work had its New York City Ballet premiere on January 19, 1978, at the New York State Theater. NYCB principals Heather Watts and Daniel Duell were the first to dance it.
