= Western Connecticut Youth Orchestra =

Background information
- Also known as: Ridgefield Symphony Youth Orchestra
- Origin: Ridgefield, Connecticut, United States
- Genres: Classical, world, contemporary classic
- Occupation: Youth Symphony Orchestra
- Years active: 2003–present
- Members: Executive Director; Ruth W. Feldman; Music Director; Eric Mahl
- Website: wctyo.org

The Western Connecticut Youth Orchestra (WCYO) is a not-for-profit organization providing young musicians in the Fairfield County and upper Westchester County areas with classical symphonic, concert band and string orchestra experience through participation in the symphony orchestra, Wind Ensemble and String Ensemble respectively. The WCYO mission is to provide an opportunity for young musicians to develop their musical talents through education and performance, to foster an awareness and appreciation of standard and modern repertoire, and to provide cultural enrichment to the surrounding communities. Based in Ridgefield, Connecticut, the WCYO orchestras have toured in Sweden, Austria, and Paris, and have performed at Carnegie Hall and Avery Fisher Hall at Lincoln Center. Auditions are required for acceptance into the ensembles.

== History ==
The WCYO was founded in 2002 as the Ridgefield Symphony Youth Orchestra. Twenty-five young musicians were selected as members of the inaugural youth orchestra, which began weekly rehearsals in January 2003. In the fall of 2005, the program grew to include a string ensemble which allowed the organization to reach and nurture a broader range of musical talents and abilities. As part of its goal to establish greater recognition of the organization's regional focus, in August 2008 the organization changed its name to the Western Connecticut Youth Orchestra. In 2010, the program further expanded to include the wind ensemble. Together the three ensembles consist of nearly 100 auditioned musicians age 8 through 18, hailing from 20 towns in CT and NY.

== Orchestras ==
- Western Connecticut Youth Orchestra, Symphony Orchestra -- Eric Mahl, music director
- Western Connecticut Youth Orchestra, String Ensemble -- Joanna Giordano, conductor
- Western Connecticut Youth Orchestra, Wind Ensemble -- Malin Carta, conductor
