= A Symphony: New England Holidays =

Composition for orchestra by Charles Ives

- by Charles Ives
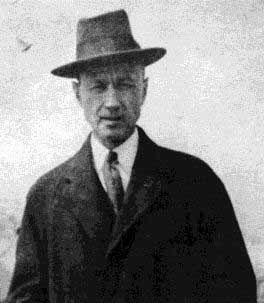
- Ives c. 1913
- Composed: 1897–1913
- Movements: 4
- Scoring: orchestra

A Symphony: New England Holidays, also known as A New England Holiday Symphony or simply a Holiday Symphony, is a composition for orchestra written by Charles Ives. It took Ives from 1897 to 1913 to complete all four movements. The four movements in order are:

1. Washington's Birthday
2. Decoration Day
3. The Fourth of July
4. Thanksgiving and Forefathers' Day

The movements coincide with each season; winter, spring, summer, and fall, respectively. While together these pieces are called a symphony, they may be played individually and thought of as separate works. As Ives dictates in his Memos:

There is no special musical connection among these four movements ... which leads me to observe that quite a number of larger forms (symphonies, sonatas, suites, etc.) may not always necessarily form, or were originally intended to form, such a complete organic whole that the breath of unity is smothered all out if one or two movements are played separately sometimes.

Holiday Symphony exemplifies Ives's varied, unique use of dissonance that gave his works a more dynamic range of emotion. "Each [movement] expresses its particular scene and feeling ... [using] the mingling of stylistic voices, the meta-style, that had become second nature to Ives. They all contain the shared pattern of splicing introverted slow music and extroverted fast music."

== Introduction and history ==
Charles Ives got the idea to write a holiday symphony during the summer of 1905. He wanted to write each movement as if it were based on a grown man's memory of his childhood holidays. "Here are melodies like icons, resonating with memory and history, with war, childhood, community, and nation." Ives constructed these movements based on personal memories from his past, including his father, George Ives, and the town of Danbury. His father had a huge impact on Ives's compositions, especially after he died in November 1894. Ives lived in Danbury throughout his childhood, a town which holds many of the life experiences that inspired him to compose a Holiday Symphony.

New England Holidays exemplifies "multi-tonality in the reharmonization of borrowed music ... and [mixing of] several keys." This work is notorious for its quotations, in particular its complex overlapping of multiple sources. Without the plethora of quotation, Holiday Symphony would lose its ability to call forth memories and emotions.

The first three movements of Holiday Symphony were performed in the United States and Europe in 1931 and 1932 under the direction of Nicolas Slonimsky. "The concerts created great excitement: laughter, protest, enthusiasm. Ives's music never occupied more than a single modest spot on each pair of programs, but several important critics singled it out for serious and admiring comment."

== Movements ==
=== I. Washington's Birthday ===
Washington's Birthday is an impressionistic piece "featuring complex harmony scored mostly for many-stranded strings." It was arranged for strings, including an offstage violin, horn, flute (doubling piccolo), a set of bells, and Jew's harps. Washington’s Birthday was finished in 1909, then rescored and published in 1913. The performance time of this piece is eleven to twelve minutes.

For the first part of this piece, Ives aimed to create a cold, dreary night in February. "Dissonant mostly whole-tone chords rise and fall in parallel motion to suggest the snow drifts and the hills."

The allegro part in the middle of the piece reflects old barn-dance tunes; "Multiple overlapping dissonant ostinatos evoke the hubbub of the crowd." The barn dance contains the image of a country fiddling; a memorial to John Starr, a folk artist who died in 1890 at age 48.

The piece ends with "the sleepy players intoning 'Goodnight, Ladies', then the music seems to dissolve in the mind" as "a solo violin plays reminiscences of the fiddle tunes, representing memories of the dance that echoes in the minds of the young folk as they head home."

Washington's Birthday was the first piece by Ives to be recorded in 1934 when Slonimsky conducted the Pan-America Orchestra for New Music Quarterly Recordings.

=== II. Decoration Day ===
Decoration Day was completed in 1912. Ives arranged the piece for full orchestra, and it lasts about nine to ten minutes. The piece is scored for 2 flutes with optional piccolo, 2 oboes and solo English horn, 2 clarinets and optional E-flat clarinet, 2 bassoons, 4 horns, 2 or 3 trumpets, 3 trombones, tuba, timpani, snare drum, bass drum with attached cymbals, high bells or celesta, low bells, and strings. Numerous instruments are called on to play offstage, including the English horn, two solo violins and a solo viola, the high and low bells, and a trumpet imitating a military bugle.

Ives was inspired to write Decoration Day after listening to his father's marching band play on Decoration Day. The marching band would march from the Soldiers' Monument at the center of Danbury to Wooster Cemetery, and there Ives would play "Taps". The band would leave often playing Reeves's "Second Regiment Connecticut National Guard March".

"'Decoration Day' begins with an extended meditative section, mostly for strings," symbolizing morning and "the awakening of memory". Ives has the aforementioned players separated from the orchestra play as if they are alone, in what he calls "shadow lines". The music slowly unfolds, yielding an eerie mix of major and minor keys. Ives begins to incorporate his memories of Decoration Day into his piece by transforming "Marching Through Georgia" into the mournful "Tenting on the Old Camp Ground". At this point, we are back in the cemetery where his father's marching band stops, and just as Ives played "Taps" as a boy, he writes "Taps" into Decoration Day. "Taps" is coupled with "Nearer, My God, to Thee" played by the strings. Ives uses "Taps" to pave a way from the despairing section to the elated section. "On the last note of 'Taps' the music begins to surge into a drumbeat that crescendos until with a sudden cut we are in the middle of the march back to town, and the pealing melody of 'Second Regiment'". Ives follows this jubilation with the music from the beginning of the piece.

The score of Decoration Day was published for the first time in 1989.

=== III. The Fourth of July ===
The Fourth of July was completely scored for full orchestra in the summer of 1912. The piece lasts six to seven minutes, and is scored for two flutes, one or two piccolos, an optional two or three fifes, two oboes, two or three clarinets, two bassoons and contrabassoon, four horns, three trumpets and a cornet, three trombones and tuba, timpani, snare drum, bass drum and cymbals, xylophone, 2 players on different pitches of bells, piano, and strings, including three solo "extra" violins.

Ives wrote The Fourth of July intending it to exemplify the excitement a boy feels during the Fourth of July celebrations and the freedom felt on that special day. He begins the piece with strings entering quietly; the sound and rhythmic intensity amplify steadily. This segues into the parade-like material of "Columbia, the Gem of the Ocean", followed by fireworks, simulated by Ives's sketch of "The General Slocum". The movement ends peacefully with the imagery of falling sparks, signaling the end of the Fourth of July.

It was thought to be one of Ives's most challenging pieces; the overlapping of an abundance of quotations creates heightened dissonance. More quotations that can be found within The Fourth of July are "Yankee Doodle", "Dixie", "Battle Cry of Freedom", Henry Clay Work's "Marching Through Georgia", "Battle Hymn of the Republic", "Sailor's Hornpipe", "Battle Cry of Freedom", The White Cockade, "Tramp! Tramp! Tramp!"， "The Girl I Left Behind Me", “Hail, Columbia", "Garryowen", "The Irish Washerwoman", "My Country, 'Tis of Thee", John Stafford Smith's tune for "The Star-Spangled Banner", Vincenzo Bellini's "Katty Darling" (a contrafact on Bellini's "Vaga Luna"), and Henry Clay Work's "Kingdom Coming".

=== IV. Thanksgiving and Forefathers' Day ===
Thanksgiving and Forefathers' Day was the first movement in Holiday Symphony to be written. Ives started writing it as two organ pieces, a prelude and a postlude, in 1887 for a Thanksgiving church service; this is one of the reasons why it seems so conservative compared to the other three movements. He finished arranging Thanksgiving and Forefathers' Day in 1904 as one orchestral movement.

The piece is scored for 2 or 3 flutes, piccolo, 2 oboes, 2 or 3 clarinets, 2 or 3 bassoons, contrabassoon, 4 or 5 horns, 3 or 4 trumpets, 3 or 4 trombones and tuba, timpani, 2 or 3 players on different pitches of bells, 1 or 2 players on different pitches of chimes, celeste, piano and strings, as well as an offstage choir, and an optional offstage band of 4 horns, trombone, and contrabassoon.

"The middle section has a folklike simplicity and grace that Ives rarely allowed himself in orchestral music." Ives tried to incorporate Puritan qualities into the music. Major and minor chords a step apart were meant to "represent the sternness and strength and austerity of the Puritan character." The piece also contains "a scythe or reaping harvest theme which is a kind of off-beat, off-key counterpoint."
