= Stephen Drury (musician) =

American musician (born 1955)

- Born: Stephen Drury; April 13, 1955; Spokane, Washington, United States
- Education: Harvard University
- Occupations: Pianist; conductor; electronic musician

Stephen Drury (born April 13, 1955) is an American pianist, conductor and electronic musician. He is the music director of the contemporary music ensemble Callithumpian Consort and teaches at the New England Conservatory of Music. Much of Drury's career has been centered in the Boston area. The Boston Globe has referred to him as the "local new-music authority".

== Early life ==
Drury was born in Spokane, Washington in 1955. He was a student of Margaret Ott, Patricia Zander, and Claudio Arrau.

He graduated from Harvard University in 1976 and attended Juilliard School for one year where he was taught by William Masselos.

== Career ==
Drury served as the music director of the American Repertory Theater in the 1980s. Since 2018, he has been Professor of Piano Contemporary Classical Music at Boston Conservatory at Berklee.

He has performed and recorded a range of compositions by classical and contemporary composers including Igor Stravinsky, Charles Ives, John Cage, Frederic Rzewski, Elliott Carter, and John Zorn.

His CD of Rzewski's The People United Will Never Be Defeated! is considered by critics to be the definitive recording of that work. He performed with Frederic Rzewski at Carnegie Hall in 2008.

His CD of Zorn's Carny" (John Zorn, Angelus Novus, Tzadik 7028) is also considered by critics to be the definitive recording of that work.

== Discography ==
- Youthful Rapture: Chamber Music of Percy Grainger - 1987
- Eliott Carter: Night Fantasies; John Cage: Etudes Australes (Book 1) - 1991
- Frederic Rzewski: The People United Will Never Be Defeated - 1994
- John Cage: In a Landscape - 1994
- Cage: The Piano Works I - 1995
- John Cage: The Piano Concertos - 1997
- Cage: The Piano Works, Vol. 3 - 1998
- Faith, the Loss of Faith, and the Return of Faith - 1999
- John Cage: The Orchestral Works 2 - 2000
- Cage: The Works for Violin, Vol. 3 - 2000
- John Cage: Atlas Eclipticalis with Winter Music - 2007
- John Luther Adams: for Lou Harrison - 2007
- Iannis Xenakis: Kraanerg - 2008
- John Luther Adams: Four Thousand Holes - 2011
- John Luther Adams: Songbirdsongs - 2012
- Torrid Nature Scenes - 2013
- Keyboards/Winds - Music of Louis Karchin - 2023
