= Charles Ives =

American modernist composer (1874–1954)

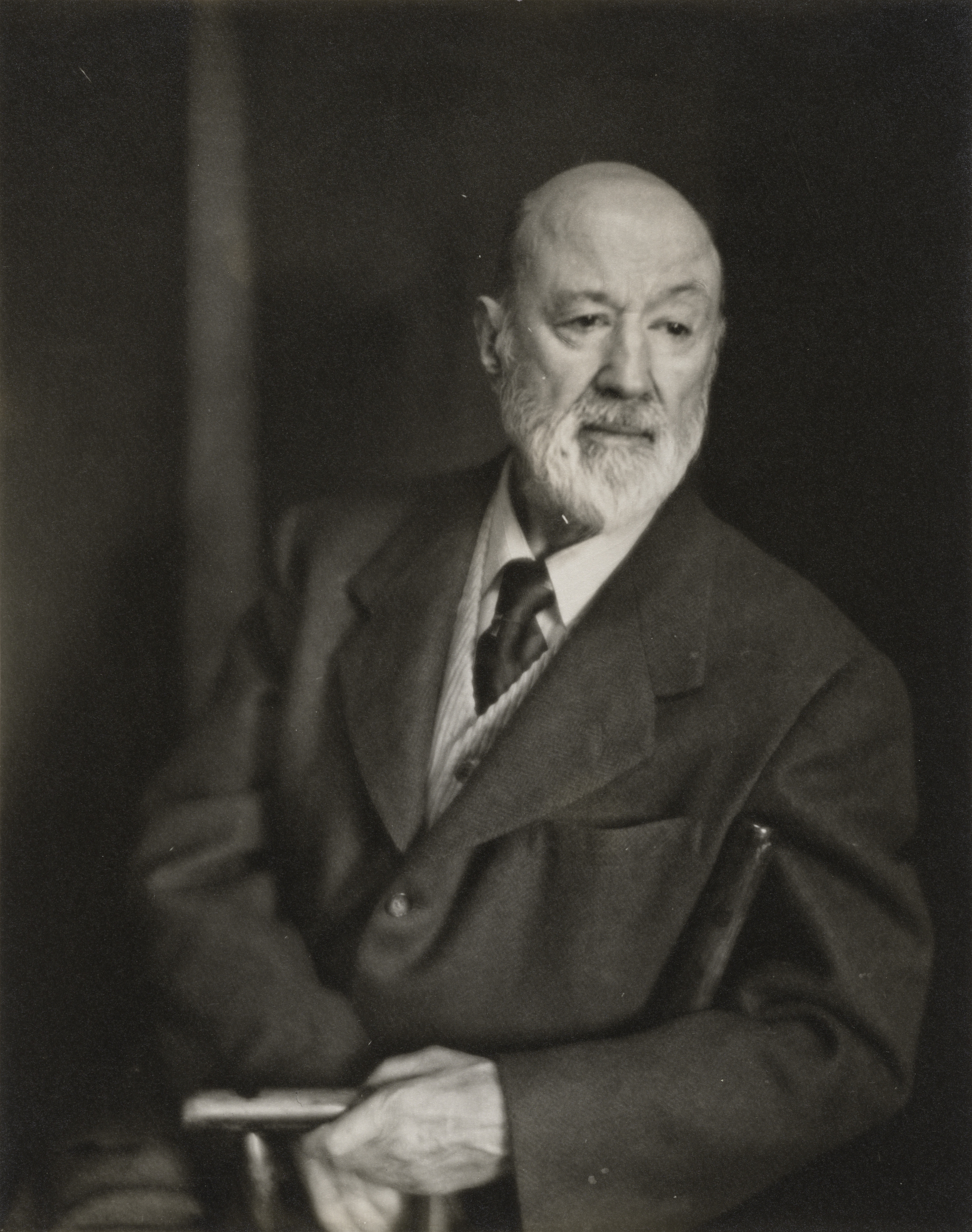
- Portrait c. 1947
- Born: October 20, 1874; Danbury, Connecticut, US
- Died: May 19, 1954 (aged 79); New York City, US
- Occupations: Composer, actuary, businessman
- Spouse: Harmony Twichell (m. 1908)

Charles Edward Ives (/aɪvz/; October 20, 1874 – May 19, 1954) was an American modernist composer, actuary and businessman. Ives was among the earliest renowned American composers to achieve recognition on a global scale. His music was largely ignored during his early career, and many of his works went unperformed for many years. Later in life, the quality of his music was publicly recognized through the efforts of contemporaries like Henry Cowell and Lou Harrison, and he came to be regarded as an "American original".

Ives was also among the first composers to engage in a systematic program of experimental music, with musical techniques including polytonality, polyrhythm, tone clusters, aleatory elements, and quarter tones. The experimentation foreshadowed many musical innovations that were later more widely adopted during the 20th century; hence, Ives is often regarded as the leading American composer of art music of the 20th century.

Sources of Ives's tonal imagery included hymn tunes and traditional songs; he also incorporated melodies of town bands at holiday parades, the fiddlers at Saturday night dances, patriotic songs, sentimental parlor ballads, and the melodies of Stephen Foster.

== Early life and education ==
Ives was born in Danbury, Connecticut, on October 20, 1874, the son of George (Edward) Ives, a US Army bandleader in the American Civil War, and his wife, Mary Elizabeth Ives. The Iveses, descended from founding colonists of Connecticut, were one of Danbury's leading families, and they were prominent in business and civic improvement. They were similarly active in progressive social movements of the 19th century, including the abolition of slavery.

George Ives directed bands, choirs, and orchestras, and taught music theory and a number of instruments. Charles got his influences by sitting in the Danbury town square and listening to his father's marching band and other bands on other sides of the square simultaneously. His father taught him and his brother (Joseph) Moss Ives (February 5, 1876 – April 7, 1939) music, teaching harmony and counterpoint and guided his first compositions; George took an open-minded approach to theory, encouraging him to experiment in bitonal and polytonal harmonizations. It was from him that Ives also learned the music of Stephen Foster. He became a church organist at the age of 14 and wrote various hymns and songs for church services, including his Variations on "America", which he wrote for a Fourth of July concert in Brewster, New York. It is considered challenging even by modern concert organists, but he famously spoke of it as being "as much fun as playing baseball", a commentary on his own organ technique at that age.

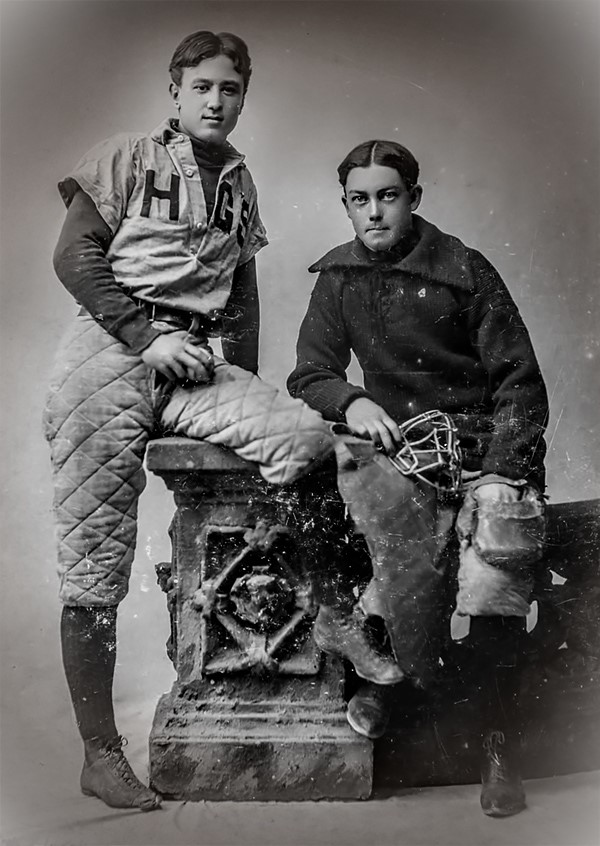
Charles Ives, left, captain of the baseball team and pitcher for Hopkins Grammar School, aged 18 (c. 1893)

Ives moved to New Haven, Connecticut, in 1893, enrolling in the Hopkins School, where he captained the baseball team. In September 1894, Ives entered Yale University, studying under Horatio Parker. Here he composed in a choral style similar to his mentor, writing church music and even an 1896 campaign song for William McKinley. On November 4, 1894, his father died, a crushing blow to him, but to a large degree, he continued the musical experimentation he had begun with him. His brother Moss later became a lawyer.

At Yale, Ives was a prominent figure; he was a member of HeBoule, Delta Kappa Epsilon (Phi chapter) and Wolf's Head Society, and sat as chairman of the Ivy Committee. He enjoyed sports at Yale and played on the varsity American football team. Michael C. Murphy, his coach, once remarked that it was a "crying shame" that he spent so much time at music as otherwise he could have been a champion sprinter. His works Calcium Light Night and Yale-Princeton Football Game show the influence of college and sports on Ives's composition. He wrote his Symphony No. 1 as his senior thesis under Parker's supervision. Ives graduated from Yale in 1898, and continued his work as a church organist until May 1902.

== Career ==
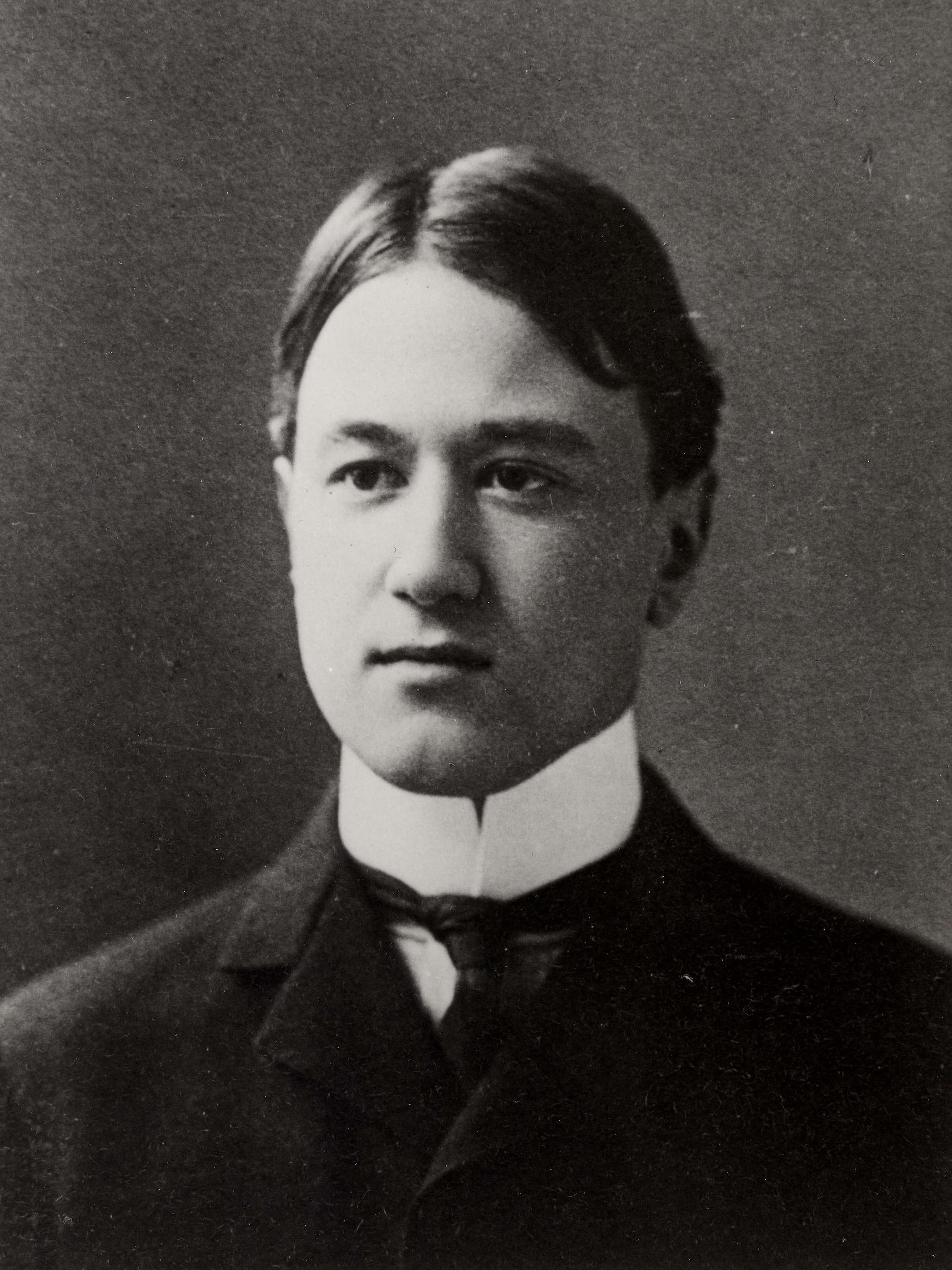
Ives's graduation portrait from Yale University, c. June 1898

Following graduation, Ives started work in the actuarial department of the Mutual Life Insurance Company of New York. In 1899, Ives moved to employment with the insurance agency Charles H. Raymond & Co., where he stayed until 1906. In 1907, upon the failure of Raymond & Co., he and his friend Julian Myrick formed their own insurance agency Ives & Co., which later became Ives & Myrick, where he remained until he retired.

During his career as an insurance executive and actuary, Ives devised creative ways to structure life-insurance packages for people of means, which laid the foundation of the modern practice of estate planning. His Life Insurance with Relation to Inheritance Tax, published in 1918, was well received. As a result of this he achieved considerable fame in the insurance industry of his time, with many of his business peers surprised to learn that he was also a composer. In his spare time, he composed music and, until his marriage, worked as an organist in Danbury and New Haven as well as Bloomfield, New Jersey, and New York City.

In 1907, Ives suffered the first of several "heart attacks" (as he and his family called them) that he had throughout his life. These attacks may have been psychological in origin rather than physical. Stuart Feder questions the legitimacy of these heart attacks, as he could not find any medical confirmation of them in previous reports. According to Feder, "For the only reliable information tells us that he suffered from palpitations, not pain, the cardinal symptom of heart attack." Following his recovery from the 1907 attack, Ives entered into one of the most creative periods of his life as a composer.

Ives had a successful career in insurance. He also continued to be a prolific composer until he suffered another of several heart attacks in 1918, after which he composed very little. He wrote his last piece, the song "Sunrise", in August 1926. In 1922, Ives published his 114 Songs, which represents the breadth of his work as a composer—it includes art songs, songs he wrote as a teenager and young man, and highly dissonant songs such as "The Majority".

According to his wife, one day in early 1927, Ives came downstairs with tears in his eyes. He could compose no more, he said; "nothing sounds right". There have been numerous theories advanced to explain the silence of his late years. It seems as mysterious as the last several decades of the life of Jean Sibelius, who stopped composing at almost the same time. While Ives had stopped composing, and was increasingly plagued by health problems, he continued to revise and refine his earlier work, as well as oversee premieres of his music.

After continuing health problems, including diabetes, in 1930 he retired from his insurance business. Although he had more time to devote to music, he was unable to write any new music. During the 1940s, he revised his Concord Sonata, publishing it in 1947 (an earlier version of the sonata and the accompanying prose volume, Essays Before a Sonata were privately printed in 1920).

Ives died of a stroke in 1954 in New York City. His widow, who died in 1969 at age 92, bequeathed the royalties from his music to the American Academy of Arts and Letters for the Charles Ives Prize.

== Musical career ==
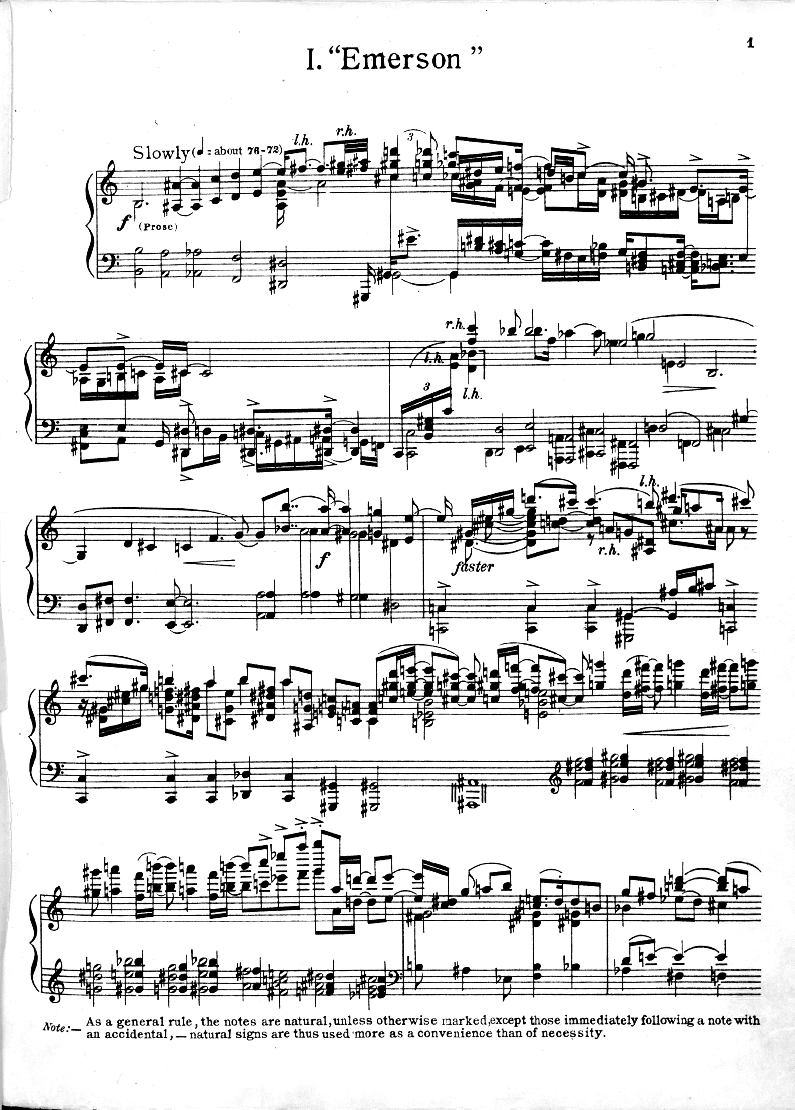
The beginning of the Concord Sonata, first edition

Ives's career and dedication to music began when he started playing drums in his father's band at a young age. Ives published a large collection of songs, many of which had piano parts. He composed two string quartets and other works of chamber music, though he is now best known for his orchestral music. His work as an organist led him to write Variations on "America" in 1891, which he premiered at a recital celebrating the Fourth of July.

He composed four numbered symphonies as well as a number of works with the word 'Symphony' in their titles, as well as The Unanswered Question (1908), written for the unusual combination of trumpet, four flutes, and string quartet. The Unanswered Question was influenced by the New England writers Ralph Waldo Emerson and Henry David Thoreau.

Around 1910, Ives began composing his most accomplished works, including the Holiday Symphony and Three Places in New England. The Piano Sonata No. 2: Concord, Mass., 1840-60 (known as the Concord Sonata), was one of his most notable pieces. He started work on this in 1911 and completed most of it in 1915. However, it was not until 1920 that the piece was published. His revised version was not released until 1947. This piece contains one of the most striking examples of his experimentation. In the second movement, he instructed the pianist to use a 14 3/4 in (37 cm) piece of wood to create a massive cluster chord. The piece also amply demonstrates Ives's fondness for musical quotation: the opening bars of Beethoven's Fifth Symphony are quoted in each movement. Sinclair's catalogue also notes less obvious quotations of Beethoven's Hammerklavier Sonata and various other works.

Another notable piece of orchestral music Ives completed was his Symphony No. 4, which he worked on from 1910 to 1916, with further revisions in the 1920s. This four-movement symphony is notable for its complexity and vast orchestra. A complete performance of the work was not given until 1965, half a century after it was completed and over a decade after Ives's death.

Ives left behind material for an unfinished Universe Symphony, which he was unable to complete despite two decades of work. This was due to his health problems as well as his shifting ideas of the work.

== Reception ==
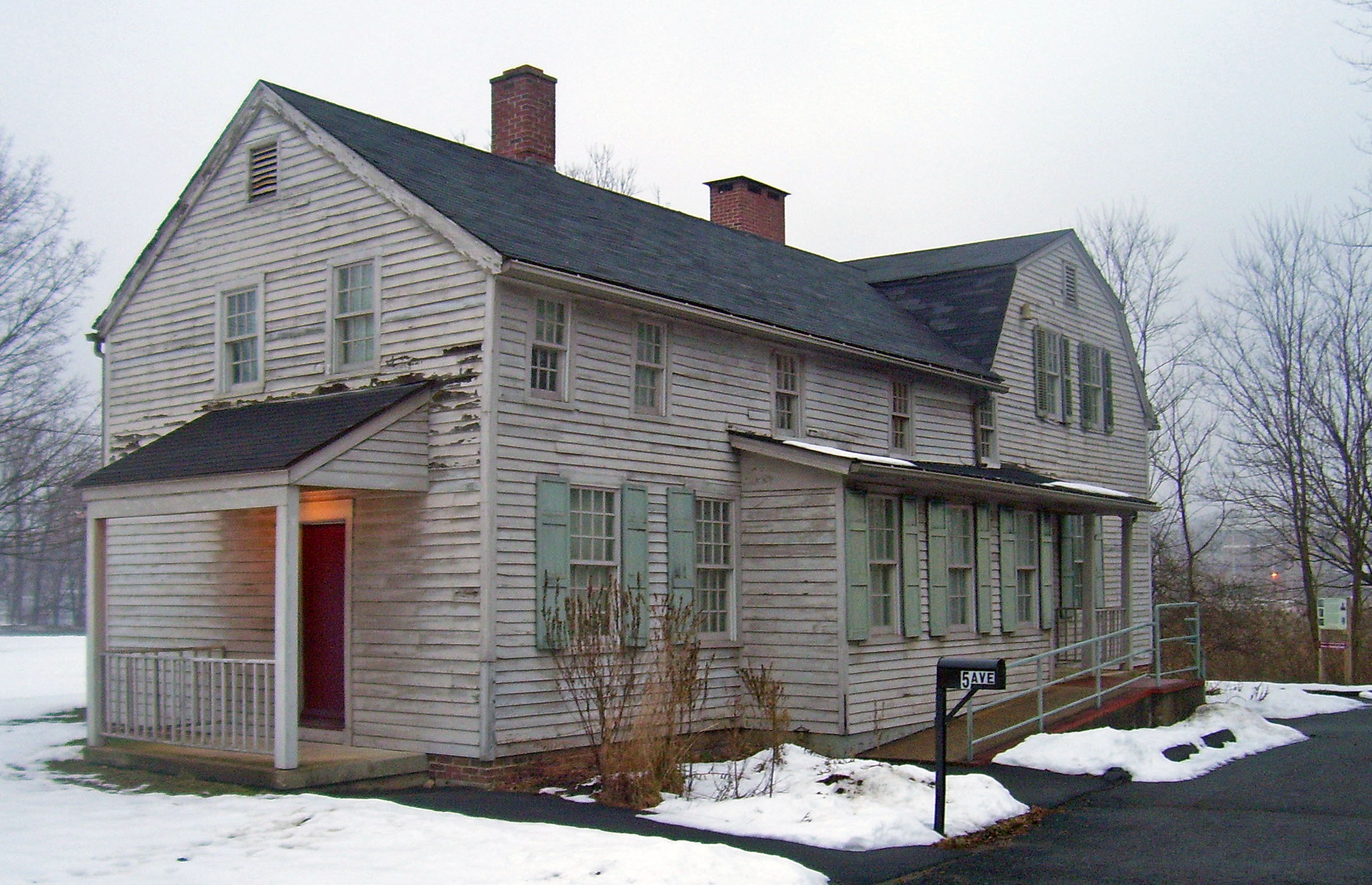
Charles Ives House in Danbury, Connecticut

Ives's music was largely ignored during his life, particularly during the years in which he actively composed. Many of his published works went unperformed even many years after his death in 1954. However, his reputation in more recent years has greatly increased. The Juilliard School commemorated the fiftieth anniversary of his death by performing his music over six days in 2004. His musical experiments, including his increasing use of dissonance, were not well received by his contemporaries. The difficulties in performing the rhythmic complexities in his major orchestral works made them daunting challenges even decades after they were composed.

Early supporters of Ives's music included Henry Cowell, Elliott Carter, and Aaron Copland. Cowell's periodical New Music published a substantial number of Ives's scores (with his approval). But for nearly 40 years, Ives had few performances of his music that he did not personally arrange or financially back. He generally used Nicolas Slonimsky as the conductor. After seeing a copy of Ives's self-published 114 Songs during the 1930s, Copland published a newspaper article praising the collection.

Ives began to acquire some public recognition during the 1930s, with performances of a chamber orchestra version of his Three Places in New England, both in the US and on tour in Europe by conductor Nicolas Slonimsky. The Town Hall (New York City) premiered his Concord Sonata in 1939, featuring pianist John Kirkpatrick. This received favorable commentary in the major New York newspapers. Later, around the time of Ives's death in 1954, Kirkpatrick teamed with soprano Helen Boatwright for the first extended recorded recital of Ives's songs for the obscure Overtone label (Overtone Records catalog number 7). They recorded a new selection of songs for the Ives Centennial Collection that Columbia Records published in 1974.

In the 1940s, Ives met Lou Harrison, a fan of his music who began to edit and promote it. Most notably, Harrison conducted the premiere of the Symphony No. 3, The Camp Meeting (1904) in 1946. The next year, it won Ives the Pulitzer Prize for Music. He gave the prize money away (half of it to Harrison), saying "prizes are for boys, and I'm all grown up".

Ives was a generous financial supporter of twentieth-century music, often financing works that were written by other composers. This he did in secret, telling his beneficiaries that his wife wanted him to do so. Nicolas Slonimsky said in 1971, "He financed my entire career".

At this time, Ives was also promoted by Bernard Herrmann, who worked as a conductor at CBS and in 1940 became principal conductor of the CBS Symphony Orchestra. While there, he championed Ives's music. When they met, Herrmann confessed that he had tried his hand at performing the Concord Sonata. Ives, who avoided the radio and the phonograph, agreed to make a series of piano recordings from 1933 to 1943. One of the more unusual recordings, made in New York City in 1943, features Ives playing the piano and singing the words to his popular World War I song "They Are There!", which he composed in 1917. He revised it in 1942–43 for World War II.

Ives's piano recordings were later issued in 1974 by Columbia Records on a special LP set for his centenary. New World Records issued 42 tracks of his recordings on CD on April 1, 2006, as Ives Plays Ives.

In Canada in the 1950s, the expatriate English pianist Lloyd Powell played a series of concerts including all of Ives's piano works, at the University of British Columbia.

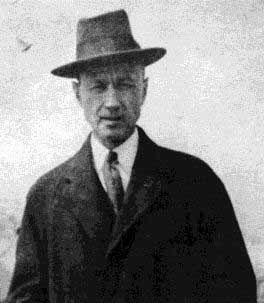
Ives in 1913

Recognition of Ives's music steadily increased. He received praise from Arnold Schoenberg, who regarded him as a monument to artistic integrity, and from the New York School of William Schuman. Shortly after Schoenberg's death (three years before Ives died), his widow found a note written by her husband. The note had originally been written in 1944 when Schoenberg was living in Los Angeles and teaching at UCLA. It said: "There is a great Man living in this Country – a composer. He has solved the problem how to preserve one's self-esteem and to learn [sic]. He responds to negligence by contempt. He is not forced to accept praise or blame. His name is Ives."

In 1951, Leonard Bernstein conducted the world premiere of Ives's Symphony No. 2 in a broadcast concert by the New York Philharmonic. The Iveses heard the performance on their cook's radio and were amazed at the audience's warm reception to the music. Bernstein continued to conduct Ives's music and made a number of recordings with the Philharmonic for Columbia Records. He honored Ives on one of his televised youth concerts and in a special disc included with the reissue of the 1960 recording of the second symphony and the "Fourth of July" movement from Ives's Holiday Symphony.

Another pioneering Ives recording, undertaken during the 1950s, was the first complete set of the four violin sonatas, performed by Minneapolis Symphony concertmaster Rafael Druian and John Simms. Leopold Stokowski took on Symphony No. 4 in 1965, regarding the work as "the heart of the Ives problem". The Carnegie Hall world premiere by the American Symphony Orchestra led to the first recording of the music. Another promoter of his was choral conductor Gregg Smith, who made a series of recordings of his shorter works during the 1960s. These included the first stereo recordings of the psalm settings and arrangements of many short pieces for theater orchestra. The Juilliard String Quartet recorded the two string quartets during the 1960s.

In the early 21st century, conductor Michael Tilson Thomas is an enthusiastic exponent of Ives's symphonies, as is composer and biographer Jan Swafford. Ives's work is regularly programmed in Europe. He has also inspired pictorial artists, most notably Eduardo Paolozzi, who entitled one of his 1970s sets of prints Calcium Light Night, each print being named for an Ives piece (including Central Park in the Dark). In 1991, Connecticut's legislature designated Ives as that state's official composer.

The Scottish baritone Henry Herford began a survey of Ives's songs in 1990, but this remains incomplete. The record company involved (Unicorn-Kanchana) collapsed. Pianist-composer and Wesleyan University professor Neely Bruce has made a life's study of Ives. To date, he has staged seven parts of a concert series devoted to the complete songs of Ives. Musicologist David Gray Porter reconstructed a piano concerto, the "Emerson" Concerto, from Ives's sketches. A recording of the work was released by Naxos Records.

American singer and composer Frank Zappa included Charles Ives in a list of influences that he presented in the liner notes of his debut album Freak Out! (1966). Ives continues to influence contemporary composers, arrangers and musicians. Planet Arts Records released Mists: Charles Ives for Jazz Orchestra. Ives befriended and encouraged a young Elliott Carter. In addition, Phil Lesh, bassist of the Grateful Dead, described Ives as one of his two musical heroes. Jazz musician Albert Ayler also named Charles Ives as an influence in a 1970 interview with Swing Journal.

American microtonal musician and composer Johnny Reinhard reconstructed and performed Universe symphony in 1996.

The Unanswered Ives is an hour-long film documentary directed by Anne-Kathrin Peitz and produced by Accentus Music (Leipzig, Germany). This was released in 2018 and shown on Swedish and German television stations; it features interviews with Jan Swafford, John Adams, James Sinclair and Jack Cooper.

In 1965, Ives won a Grammy Award for his composition Symphony No. 4 and the American Symphony Orchestra won for their recording of the work. Ives had previously been nominated in 1964 for "New England Holidays" and in 1960 for Symphony No. 2.

Igor Stravinsky praised Ives. In 1966 he said: "[Ives] was exploring the 1960s during the heyday of Strauss and Debussy. Polytonality; atonality; tone clusters; perspectivistic effects; chance; statistical composition; permutation; add-a-part, practical-joke, and improvisatory music: these were Ives’s discoveries a half-century ago as he quietly set about devouring the contemporary cake before the rest of us even found a seat at the same table."

John Cage expressed his admiration for Ives in "Two Statements on Ives", writing "I think that Ives's relevance increases as time goes on" and stating that "his contribution to American music was in every sense 'not only spiritual, by also concretely musical.' Nowadays everything I hear by Ives delights me." Cage recalled that during the 1930s, he was "not interested in Ives because of the inclusion in his music of aspects of American folk and popular material". but that once he began to focus on indeterminacy, he "was able to approach Ives in an entirely different... spirit." Cage noted that Ives "knew that if sound sources came from different points in space that that fact was in itself interesting. Nobody before him had thought about this..." and stated that "the freedom that he gave to a performer saying Do this or do that according to your choice is directly in line with present indeterminate music." Cage also expressed his interest in what he called the "mud of Ives", by which he meant "the part that is not referential..." from which arises a "complex superimposition [of] lines that makes a web in which we cannot clearly perceive anything..." leading to "the possibility of not knowing what's happening..." Cage wrote that "more and more... I think this experience of non-knowledge is more useful and more important to us than the Renaissance notion of knowing A B C D E F..." Cage also praised Ives's "understanding... of inactivity and of silence..." and recalled having read an essay in which:

[Ives] sees someone sitting on a porch in a rocking chair smoking a pipe looking out over the landscape which goes into the distance and imagines that as that person who is anyone is sitting there doing nothing that he is hearing his own symphony. This I think is for all intents and purposes the goal of music. I doubt whether we can find a higher goal namely that art and our involvement in it will somehow introduce us to the very life that we are living and that we will be able without scores without performers and so forth simply to sit still to listen to the sounds which surround us and hear them as music." (Cage refers to the essay as the one "which [Ives] wrote that follows his One Hundred and Thirteen Songs", probably referring to the "Postface to 114 Songs".)

In the summer of 2019, the Charles Ives Music Festival was established in Fairfield County, Connecticut. The festival is an annual event with a focus on classical music, chamber concerts, and educational programs, as well as an affiliation with the Western Connecticut Youth Orchestra. Concerts primarily feature the music and honor the legacy of Ives.

Conductor Gustavo Dudamel and the Los Angeles Philharmonic won a Grammy Award for Best Orchestral Performance for Ives's Complete Symphonies (Deutsche Grammophon, recorded in 2020).

There is evidence that Ives backdated his scores to sound more modern than he really was. This was first proposed by Maynard Solomon, an advocate of Ives's music. This has, in turn, generated some controversy and puzzlement.

== Compositions ==
Note: Because Ives often made several different versions of the same piece, and because his work was generally ignored during his life, it is often difficult to put exact dates on his compositions. The dates given here are sometimes best guesses. There have also been controversial speculations that he purposefully misdated his own pieces earlier or later than actually written.

- Variations on "America" for organ (1892)
- The Circus Band (a march describing the Circus coming to town)
- Psalm settings (14, 42, 54, 67, 90, 135, 150) (1890s)
- String Quartet No. 1, From the Salvation Army (1897–1900)
- Symphony No. 1 in D minor (1898–1901)
- Symphony No. 2 (Ives gave dates of 1899–1902; analysis of handwriting and manuscript paper suggests 1907–1909)
- Symphony No. 3, The Camp Meeting (1908–10)
- Central Park in the Dark, a sound collage for chamber orchestra (1906, 1909)
- The Unanswered Question for chamber group (1908; rev. 1934)
- Piano Sonata No. 1 (1909–16)
- Emerson Concerto (1913–19)
- The Gong on the Hook & Ladder (Firemen's Parade on Main Street) for orchestra, Kv 28
- Tone Roads for orchestra No. 1, 'All Roads Lead To the Center' KkV38
- A set of 3 Short Pieces, A, Kk W15, No 1 'Largo Cantabile – Hymn' for string quartet & double-bass
- Hallowe'en for string quartet, piano, & bass drum, Kw11
- Piano Trio (c. 1909–10, rev. c. 1914–15)
- Violin Sonata No. 1 (1910–14; rev. c. 1924)
- Violin Sonata No. 4, Children's Day at the Camp Meeting (1911–16)
- A Symphony: New England Holidays (1904–13)
- "Robert Browning" Overture (1911–14)
- Symphony No. 4 (1912–18; rev. 1924–26)
- String Quartet No. 2 (1913–15)
- Pieces for chamber ensemble grouped as "Sets", some called Cartoons or Take-Offs or Songs Without Voices (1906–18); includes Calcium Light Night
- Three Places in New England (Orchestral Set No. 1) (1910–14; rev. 1929)
- Violin Sonata No. 2 (1914–17)
- Violin Sonata No. 3 (1914–17)
- Orchestral Set No. 2 (1915–19)
- Piano Sonata No. 2, Concord, Mass., 1840–60 (1916–19) (more commonly known as the Concord Sonata and revised many times by Ives)
- Universe Symphony (incomplete, 1915–28, worked on symphony until his death in 1954)
- 114 Songs (composed various years 1887–1921, published 1922.)
- Three Quarter Tone Piano Pieces (1923–24)
- Orchestral Set No. 3 (incomplete, 1919–26, notes added after 1934)

== Politics ==
Ives proposed in 1920 that there be a 20th amendment to the U.S. Constitution which would authorize citizens to submit legislative proposals to Congress. Members of Congress would then cull the proposals, selecting 10 each year as referendums for popular vote by the nation's electorate. He even had printed at his own expense several thousand copies of a pamphlet on behalf of his proposed amendment. The pamphlet proclaimed the need to curtail "THE EFFECTS OF TOO MUCH POLITICS IN OUR representative DEMOCRACY". He planned to distribute the pamphlets at the 1920 Republican National Convention, but they arrived from the printer after the convention had ended.

It is stated in the biographical film A Good Dissonance Like a Man that the first of Ives's crippling heart attacks occurred as a result of a World War I-era argument with a young Franklin D. Roosevelt over his idea of issuing of war bonds in amounts as low as $50 each. Roosevelt was chairman of a war bonds committee on which Ives served, and he "scorned the idea of anything so useless as a $50 bond". Roosevelt changed his mind about small contributions as seen many years later when he endorsed the March of Dimes to combat poliomyelitis.

== Personal life ==
In 1908, he married Harmony Twichell, daughter of Congregational minister Joseph Twichell and his wife, Julia Harmony Cushman.

== George Balanchine's Ivesiana ==
In 1954, several months after the still relatively unknown composer's death, the New York City Ballet premiered Ivesiana, a ballet by George Balanchine to unrelated and contrasting compositions by Ives, including The Unanswered Question and Central Park in the Dark.

== In popular culture ==
Charles Ives and his wife Harmony (née Twichell) Ives were the subjects of the opera Harmony (2021) by Robert Carl and Russell Banks, which was premiered by the Seagle Festival in August 2021. Charles Ives was played by baritone Joel Clemens and Harmony Twichell was played by soprano Victoria Erickson.

My Father Knew Charles Ives is an orchestral triptych by the American composer John Adams. The piece was commissioned by the San Francisco Symphony under conductor Michael Tilson Thomas, and serves as an autobiography and homage to Ives.

== See also ==
- Charles Ives House
