= Ultimate Collection (Don Moen album) =

Greatest hits album by Don Moen
- Released: 2013
- Genre: Contemporary Christian
- Length: 1:00:45
- Label: Integrity, Hosanna!, Columbia, Sony
- Producer: Steve Merkel, Tom Brooks, David Hamilton, Paul Mills, Don Moen, C. Ryan Dunham (Executive)

Don Moen chronology
Christmas: A Season of Hope (2012)	Ultimate Collection (2013)	Hymns of Hope (2013)

Ultimate Collection is a contemporary Christian greatest hits album of Worship music by renowned artist Don Moen and was released on March 5, 2013, by Integrity and Columbia. It contains songs written by Moen from his previous albums which have sold over five million units.

== Track listing ==
Album release
No.	Title	Writer(s)	Originally recorded on	Length
1.	"Thank You Lord"	Don Moen and Paul Baloche	Thank You Lord	5:51
2.	"God Is Good All The Time"	Don Moen and Paul Overstreet	God Is Good - Worship with Don Moen	5:13
3.	"God Will Make A Way"	Don Moen	Alleluia Music 1: Celebrate Jesus	4:20
4.	"Here We Are"	Don Moen and Claire Cloninger	I Will Sing	4:34
5.	"I Just Want To Be Where You Are"	Don Moen	Bless the Lord	4:35
6.	"He Never Sleeps"	Don Moen and Claire Cloninger	Hiding Place	4:04
7.	"Mi Corazon"	Don Moen and David Hamilton	Thank You Lord	4:56
8.	"I Offer My Life"	Don Moen and Claire Cloninger	God Is Good – Worship with Don Moen	3:44
9.	"Great Is Your Mercy"	Don Moen	I Believe There Is More	5:30
10.	"Give Thanks"	Henry Smith	Give Thanks	3:27
11.	"Worthy, You Are Worthy"	Don Moen	Give Thanks	3:34
12.	"Blessed Be The Name Of The Lord"	Don Moen	Worship with Don Moen / God Will Make a Way: The Best of Don Moen	2:50
13.	"I Am The God That Healeth Thee"	Don Moen	Worship with Don Moen / God Will Make a Way: The Best of Don Moen	3:27
14.	"I Will Sing"	Don Moen	I Will Sing	4:40
Total length:				1:00:45

== Credits ==
- Tom Brooks – Music producer
- C. Ryan Dunham – Executive producer
- David Hamilton – Music producer
- Paul Mills – Music producer
- Steve Merkel – Producer, Compiler
- Don Moen – Artist, Music producer
- Ted Skolits – Mastering
- Dave Taylor – Project coordinator
