= Tom Brooks (music producer) =

American musician and producer (born 1954)

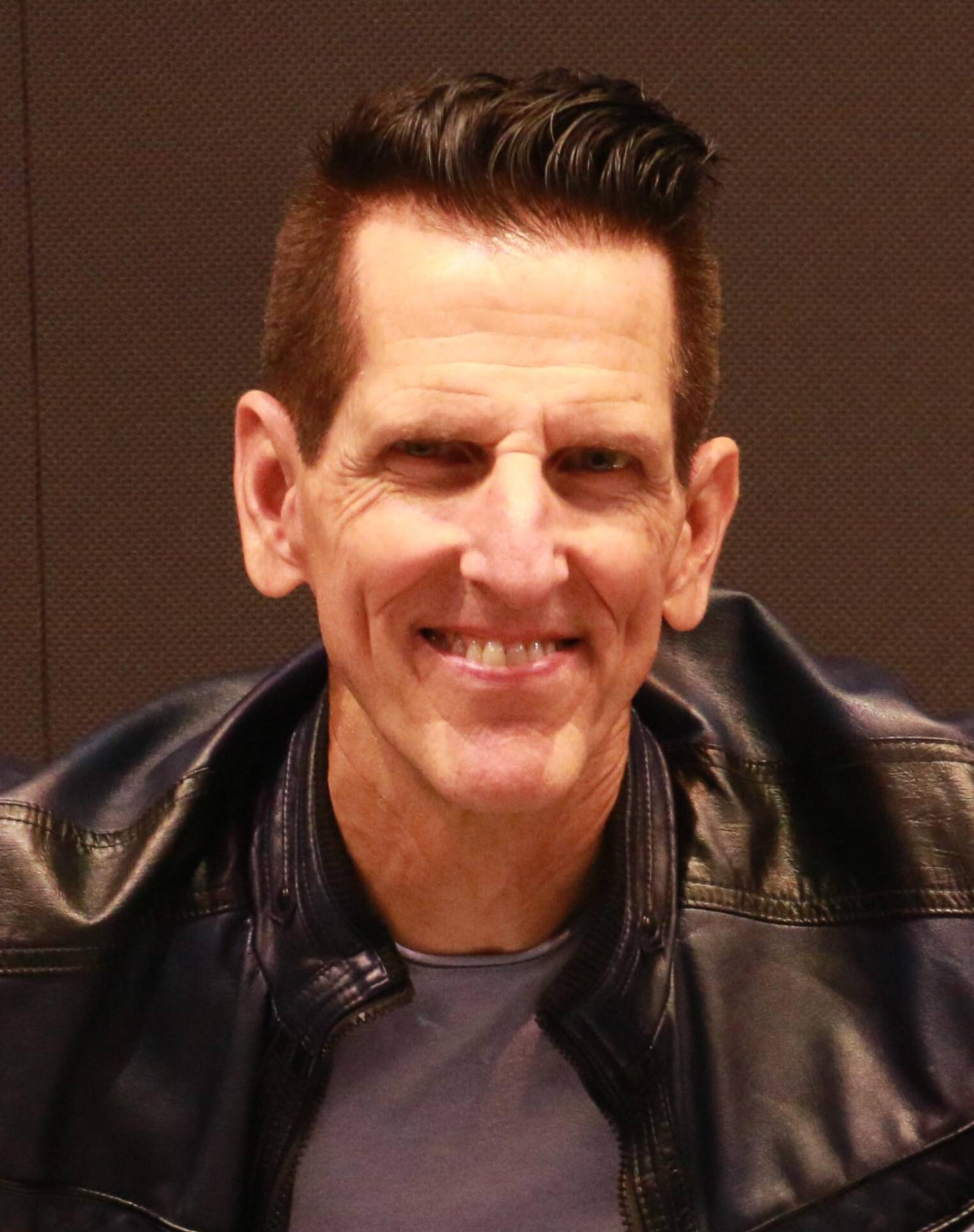
- Brooks in 2019

Background information
- Born: James Thomas Brooks; October 31, 1954 (age 71); St. Louis, Missouri, U.S.
- Occupations: Producer, arranger, engineer, keyboardist, music director, professor, conductor, author
- Instruments: Piano, Hammond B-3, synthesizers
- Years active: 1978–present
- Labels: Integrity Music, Sony Music
- Website: www.tombrooksmusic.com

Tom Brooks (born October 31, 1954) is an American music producer, arranger, engineer, and conductor. He is keyboardist/Music Director for Alan Parsons and the Alan Parsons Live Project, and is the founding producer of Integrity Music and the Hosanna Music series distributed by Sony. For his production work Brooks has been awarded 6 Platinum Albums, 12 Gold Albums, a Latin Grammy Award, and a GMA Dove Award. He is Director of the Center for Commercial Music at California Baptist University and Music Professor at Hope International University. His "Language of Music" book is published by Hal Leonard Publishing.

== Career ==
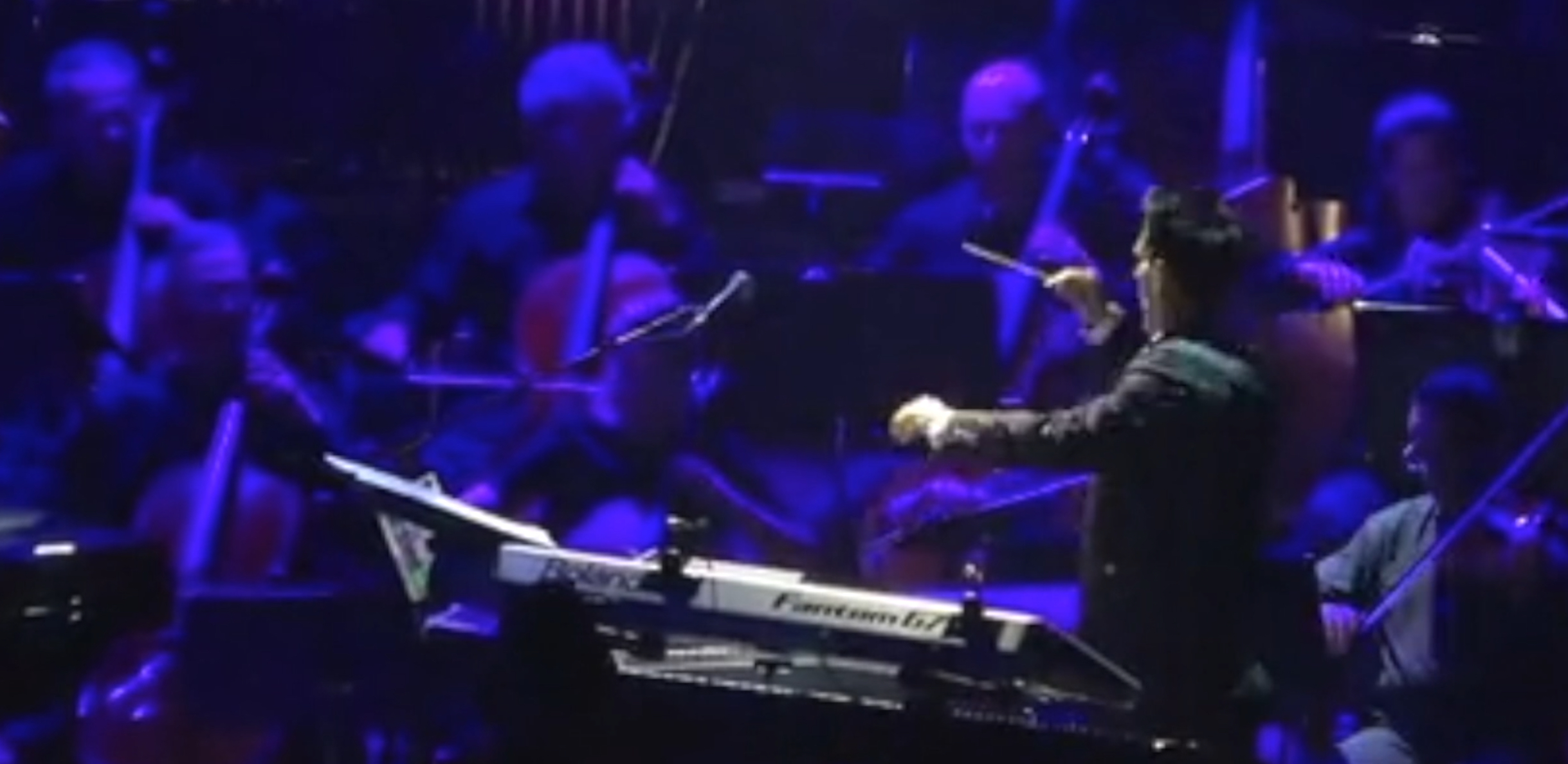
Tom Brooks, IPO, onstage 2

In 2019 Brooks conducted the Israel Philharmonic Orchestra at the Mann Auditorium in Tel Aviv debuting his Prog-Rock arrangement of The Sorcerer's Apprentice. The piece features Alan Parsons, Steve Hackett, Jake Shimabukuro, Vinnie Colaiuta, Nathan East, and Jeff Kollman. He performed for NASA at the 50th Anniversary of the Moon Landing with Neil Armstrong's son and debuted the "One Note Symphony", a song he orchestrated and co-wrote with Alan Parsons. He also launched the 'Center for Commercial Music', orchestrated for Saturday Night Live performances by Chance the Rapper, and for Kanye West's Sunday Service at Coachella.

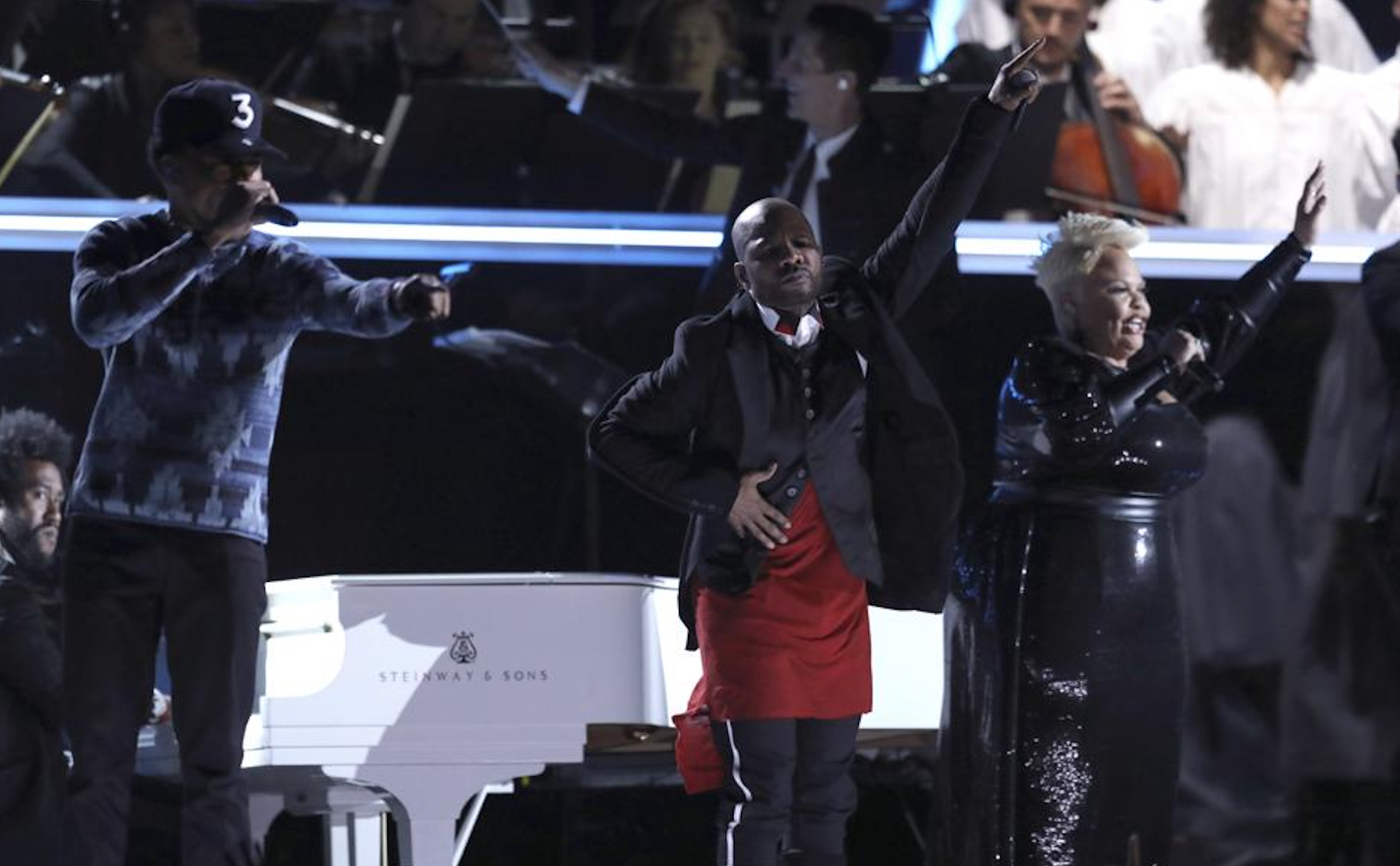
Tom Brooks, Chance at Grammy Performance

In 2017 Brooks conducted the orchestra and choir at the 59th Annual Grammy Awards ceremony in Los Angeles, performing with three-time Grammy winner Chance the Rapper, Kirk Franklin, and 40 other artists. His arrangement of Chris Tomlin’s How Great is Our God was broadcast world-wide on the CBS television network.

In 2018 Brooks performed with David Foster, Steve Vai, Katharine McPhee, Alan Parsons, and Sisterhood, along with Katy Perry, Kenny Loggins, Wilson Phillips, and Richard Marx at the "Kick Ash Bash"; a fund-raising concert event to assist victims of the Santa Barbara/Montecito fire and mudslide disaster.

In 2016 Brooks received the Latin Grammy Award for "Best Christian Album" as producer of Marcos Vidal – 25 Años.

In 2013, Brooks performed with the Medellín Philharmonic Orchestra and Alan Parsons at Parque Pies Descalzos in Medellín, Colombia. The live concert DVD was released in 2016 titled, The Alan Parsons Symphonic Project.

In 2011 The Language of Music, Brooks’ contemporary music theory textbook was published by Hal Leonard Publishing.

In 2012, Brooks joined six-time Grammy winner Aline Barros in Brasil to perform on her live concert DVD, 20 Años featuring Michael W. Smith and Abraham Laboriel.

In 2009, he performed for a crowd of 750,000 people at ‘The Experience’ event in Lagos, Nigeria along with Grammy winner Kirk Franklin, Ron Kenoly, Bebe & Cece Winans, Don Moen, Israel Houghton, Donnie McClurkin, and other international artists. He also produced a live concert DVD of the event.

In 2000, he produced the title track of O Poder do Teu Amor, from the Brazilian singer Aline Barros.

In 1997, Brooks received the GMA Dove Award for "Best Praise & Worship Album" as producer of Welcome Home featuring Ron Kenoly.

Brooks has produced 169 albums, 16 concert DVDs, 38 music training videos, and multiple choral and orchestral arrangements. He travels internationally as a keyboardist, seminar clinician, and orchestra conductor. He is a university professor and is Chief Engineer/owner of Master Recording Studios in Southern California.

=== Early ===
While studying piano at the University of Missouri in St. Louis, Brooks served as Student Conductor of the St. Louis Symphony and Assistant Conductor of the Bach Society, blending these classical influences with his rock roots. He involved symphony players in live rock events and pop studio recording sessions. He directed two broadway shows, performed at local rock venues, produced a series of children's albums titled "Super Gang!", and continued to write and produce music for advertising and corporate clients Anheuser-Busch, McDonald's, among others.

He also began to record and produce live music in area churches New Covenant Fellowship and Grace World Outreach Center where he worked with artists Kent Henry, Ron Tucker, Don Moen, Charlie & Jill LeBlanc, Jeff Hamlin, Carl & Leann Albrecht, and others who would later become key figures in his work. In 1983, Brooks produced two Praise & Worship albums, Behold His Majesty and Glory to the Lamb, the first recordings of their kind to capture live symphony orchestra and rock rhythm section with live Worship.

=== Hosanna Music ===
In 1984 these two albums came to the attention of New Wine Magazine, who offered to help market the recordings in their bi-monthly issues. As the magazine was preparing to shut down in 1985, the owners made a unique proposal to Brooks – they suggested that if he would continue to produce live Praise & Worship albums on a bi-monthly basis, they would offer their subscribers a new music album every eight weeks instead of a magazine. He agreed and the "Hosanna Music" series was born. Brooks went on to produce over 100 successful albums for Integrity's Hosanna Music, mostly recorded live in churches throughout the US and around the world. Notable among these are Lift Him Up, God Is Able, and Sing Out featuring Ron Kenoly and Give Thanks featuring Don Moen. While producing for Integrity, Brooks also created a series of instrumental albums, choral works, orchestral arrangements, and concert videos.

In 1985, Brooks arranged and produced seven albums including All Hail King Jesus featuring Kent Henry, one of the largest selling Hosanna albums in Integrity Music's history. The album went on to be certified Gold by the RIAA for sales in excess of 500,000 units.

He produced, arranged, and engineered eight albums in 1986 including Give Thanks which went on to be certified Gold by the RIAA for sales in excess of 500,000 units.

Mighty Warrior with worship leader Randy Rothwell was produced by Brooks in 1987, featuring full orchestra blended with a pop-rock rhythm section. In that same year, Brooks also arranged and produced Experience PEACE, the first in the Hosanna Instrumental Series, which is currently used by Korean Airlines to underscore their in-flight entertainment.

Brooks arranged and produced eight recordings in 1988 including "A Family Christmas" for Maranatha Music and Steadfast Love with Don Moen, and albums featuring Charlie LeBlanc, Marty Nystrom, and Joseph Garlington, plus 3 more instrumental albums including Experience JOY.

In 1989, he produced The Lord Reigns at the YWAM base in Kona Hawaii featuring Bob Fitts as well as his third album with Don Moen, Bless the Lord and Experience REST.

=== The 1990s ===
In 1990, Brooks traveled to Scotland to produce Amazing Love with Graham Kendrick as well as Don Moen's fourth album Eternal God and the first Hosanna Christmas album. He also produced the Experience LOVE album and four others.

Ron Kenoly's first album, Jesus Is Alive was produced by Brooks in 1991, along with Highest Place featuring Bob Fitts and 6 other live recordings. That same year, Brooks was also producing sessions for Maranatha Music in Southern California and moved his studio operation to Orange County in August 1991. The following day, he flew to Australia to record All Nations Worship with Mark Conner, in Melbourne.

1992 saw several milestones; Brooks arranged and produced Lift Him Up featuring Ron Kenoly at Chrysler Hall in Virginia. For the live recording Brooks brought together several world renowned Christian musicians including Abraham Laboriel, Chester Thompson, Alex Acuna, and Justo Almario. This was also the first live Hosanna concert video. Both the CD and DVD have been certified Gold by the RIAA. Brooks also produced Worship with Don Moen and He Is Faithful, the first album featuring prolific songwriter Paul Baloche.

As tensions were riding high against the Apartheid system in 1993, Brooks brought a team of 20 musicians and singers to South Africa for a goodwill tour and two live album recordings, Rejoice Africa featuring Lionel Petersen and We Are One with Tom Inglis. Both concert DVDs made powerful statements of unity with many differing cultural groups singing songs of peace side-by-side on stage together.

Brooks arranged and produced another Gold album and DVD for Ron Kenoly in 1994 titled, God Is Able in Atlanta (which featured a song with three drummers) along with Revive Us Again featuring Alvin Slaughter and 6 more successful projects. He also began a musicians' training institute at Yonsei University in Seoul, South Korea.

A highlight of 1995 was the recording of Sing Out, his fourth album with Ron Kenoly. The album and DVD featured the ‘African Children's Choir’, a percussion parade, a song in three languages and Paul Jackson Jr. on guitar. Both the CD and DVD have been certified Gold by the RIAA. Brooks also arranged and produced Integrity's Christmas album, Bethlehem's Treasure that same year featuring Kelly Willard, Bob Fitts, and Lenny LeBlanc.

In 1996, Brooks produced his fifth CD with Ron Kenoly, Welcome Home, which went on to receive a GMA Dove Award in 1997. He also produced Praise with Don Moen and 6 other album projects as well as touring again in Korea and South America.

In 1997, he again teamed up with Don Moen to produce Let Your Glory Fall in Ft. Lauderdale FL. Brooks also recorded Beauty for Ashes for Crystal Lewis and performed throughout Europe and Asia.

Brooks arranged and produced two live CDs and two concert DVDs in one night in 1998; Majesty featuring Ron Kenoly and God Is Good with Don Moen. The double concert was recorded at Liberty University in Lynchburg Virginia. He also recorded Gold for Lewis.

Brooks brought a team of musicians to Rome, Italy in 1999 to record We Offer Praises with Ron Kenoly featuring drummer Vinnie Colaiuta and the ‘Coro de Gloria’. That year also marked three more projects with Don Moen, More of You Lord, En Tu Presencia in Spanish featuring Brazilian artist Aline Barros, and the re-release of Give Thanks, making it one of the largest selling Integrity albums in their history. The WOW Worship series was also launched that same year eventually winning a Double Platinum award for Brooks.

=== The 2000s ===
On a tour of Asia in 2000, Brooks produced two albums featuring Don Moen, The Mercy Seat recorded live in Singapore and Heal Our Land recorded live in Seoul with special guest Paul Wilbur. He also produced Mas De Ti in Spanish plus six other artist albums. The Songs 4 Worship series was launched that same year awarding Brooks with a Double Platinum Album in January 2002.

Less than one month after the September 11 attacks in 2001, he took 25 gifted musicians and singers to South Korea for a live recording and tour featuring Ron Kenoly, Kent Henry, Morris Chapman, Aline Barros, Rick Muchow, Sheila E., Jeff Deyo, and more. The live recording in Seoul brought a crowd of 69,000 to Yeouido Plaza and the tour ended with a concert at the DMZ, the border with Communist North Korea.

In 2002, he arranged and produced the "American Worship Gathering", a live Concert event at the Washington Monument featuring Tommy Walker, Jeff Deyo, Don Moen, Bob Fitts, Lenny LeBlanc, Rick Muchow, Sheila E., along with Pastors Louie Giglio and Rick Warren. He was also featured on the album Songs for a Purpose Driven Life, based on Rick Warren's best selling book.

During a tour of Europe in 2003 with ‘Abe Laboriel & Friends’, Brooks played and produced a live jazz/world music album with Abe, Paul Jackson Jr, and Vinnie Colaiuta called Live in Switzerland. That year also marked the release of two more Don Moen albums, God Will Make A Way and Trono de Gracia plus iWorship – a Total Worship Experience that has received a Platinum Album sales award.

He brought a team to Madrid Spain in 2004 to produce Alabanza y Adoracion featuring Marcos Vidal along with Luis Conte, Chester Thompson, Abe Laboriel, and Paul Jackson Jr. He also produced Live at Shadow Mountain, a concert DVD featuring Charles Billingsley and Face to Face introducing new artist Cindy Diane.

In 2005 Brooks performed at Angel Stadium with Saddleback Church during their 25th anniversary celebration. In that same year the Lift Him Up Collection was released featuring Brooks's productions and many of Ron Kenoly's best-loved songs. Brooks also wrote and began to teach from his "Language of Music" program, a contemporary approach to music theory. He performed and conducted Seminars in Italy, Spain, Germany, and Latvia.

Brooks arranged and produced Brazilian artist Baby do Brasil in 2006 for her debut Christian album I Am Free. He wrote and produced theme music for the television program "Turning Point" and also recorded a training DVD titled Keyboard Master Class at the Christian Musicians Summit in New York; teaching the Seminar in Korea, China, Japan, and Singapore.

In 2007, he arranged and produced Great is The Faithfulness in French with Swiss worship artist Gilbert Chellembron along with 5 other albums. He also released The Language of Music training DVD and performed concerts/clinics with Abe Laboriel, Paul Jackson Jr, Vinnie Colaiuta, Kirk Whalum in Italy and Spain.

Brooks toured South Korea in 2008 with Sheila E and Hillsong artist Miriam Webster. Brooks produced Del Corazon introducing Lucia Parker featuring duets with Darlene Zschech and Ron Kenoly. The album was nominated for a GMA Dove Award and a Latin Grammy Award in 2009.

In 2009, Brooks arranged and produced Hymns of Peace, an instrumental collection featuring Paul Jackson Jr., Abe Laboriel, Tony Guerrero, and Greg Vail. Brooks performed at the Greek Theatre in the Michael Jackson Tribute Concert along with Steve Lukather from Toto and Earth, Wind, & Fire. He also produced Everlasting Love with Lucia Parker and Christmas with Ron Kenoly.

He produced a concert DVD in 2009–2010 at 'The Experience' festival in Lagos Nigeria with 750,000 in attendance. The celebration featured Kirk Franklin, Donnie McClurkin, Israel Houghton, Fred Hammond, Phil Driscoll, Don Moen, Ron Kenoly, and artists from all over Africa. He also arranged and produced two Christmas albums including My Treasure with Bob Fitts and Christmas – a Love Story featuring Lucia Parker.

=== The 2010s ===
The Language of Music, Brooks' contemporary theory book was first published by Hal Leonard Publishing in 2011. Integrity also released With a Thankful Heart, a Don Moen collection featuring Brooks's arranging and production work. He also toured in Africa, France, and South Korea performing and teaching.

In 2012, he traveled to Brazil to arrange and perform with Aline Barros for her 20 Anos celebration CD and DVD featuring Michael W. Smith. He performed in concert along with Phil Keaggy and Lincoln Brewster in Seattle and presented his "Language of Music" seminar at the CMS conference, He also produced Your Presence Is Heaven, a live recording in Seoul Korea and recorded God My Rock for Brenton Brown. To celebrate their 25th Anniversary, Integrity Music released 25 Songs that Changed the Way We Worship featuring many of his productions.

On August 31, 2013, Brooks performed with the Medellín Philharmonic Orchestra and Alan Parsons at Parque Pies Descalzos in Medellín, Colombia. The live concert DVD was released in 2016 titled, The Alan Parsons Symphonic Project. Brooks also performed in concert at CERN with the Orchestre de la Suisse Romande and the Alan Parsons Project. The event celebrated the recent discovery of the Higgs-Boson particle by the physicists at CERN using the Large Hadron Collider (LHC) located on the French-Swiss border and operated by the European Organization for Nuclear Research.

Later in 2013 Brooks presented his "Keyboard Master Class" at the Christian Musicians Summit conference in Seattle WA also performing with the Blues Counsel and guitarist Dave Cleveland. That same year the Ultimate Collection of Don Moen's music was released featuring Brooks's production work. He also arranged and produced his fifth album with Lucia Parker and a new project for Bill & Renee Morris. Brooks performed with The Alan Parsons Project in Italy, France, Spain, Germany, and South America.

In 2014 Brooks began production with Tiago Costa on Vivo Estas featuring Aline Barros singing in both Spanish and English. Brooks performed in Anaheim, California, with Paul Baloche and Hillsong artist Mia Fields. Brooks also worked on projects with Brandon Muchow, Saddleback Worship, Tim Davis, Ron Walters, Celebrity Cruise Lines, Lincoln Brewster, Vinnie Colaiuta, Aline Barros, Jane Lynch from Hollywood Game Night, David Pack of Ambrosia, In Response Music, Bill & Renee Morris, and long-tike collaborator Walt Harrah. He performed concerts with the Alan Parsons Project throughout the US and conducted the Clearwater Symphony Orchestra. That same year Marcos Witt recorded his album Sigues Siendo Dios at Brooks’ Master Recording Studios in Southern California.

On March 21, 2015, Brooks performed at Angel Stadium in Anaheim CA as Saddleback Church celebrated their 35th anniversary. Brooks also started a new project with Marcos Vidal, plus work with Paul Jackson Jr., Phil Sillas, Disney, Tom Kubis, Art Dragon, American Idol finalist Danny Gokey, Paul Baloche, Busch Gardens, Ron Alayra, Tim Gill, and 6-time Grammy winner Aline Barros. He performed at the annual Convoy of Hope fundraiser with David Pack of Ambrosia, Richard Page of Mr. Mister, John Elefante of Kansas, Jim Peterik of Survivor, Kelly Keagy of Night Ranger and Bobby Kimball of Toto. Brooks also conducted the Buffalo Symphony Orchestra with Alan Parsons and performed concerts throughout Europe and South America.

In November 2016 Brooks received the Latin Grammy Award for "Christian Album of the Year" for Marcos Vidal – 25 Años. His studio production work included collaborations with Ray Sidney, The All American Boys Chorus, The Tommy Coomes Praise Band, David Pack, Jane Lynch, Lawrence Guna, Marco Palos Big Band, Tim Gill, Casey Marshall, Donald Lopez, and Bosendorfer Artist Daniela Salinas. Live concert performances with Alan Parsons included cities across the US plus shows in Buenos Aires Argentina, Santiago Chile, Lima Peru, Madrid, Valencia, and Barcelona, where the group sang Parsons’ "La Sagrada Familia" at Antonio Gaudi’s striking cathedral of the same name.

2017 began for Brooks with an Alan Parsons Project Tour in New Zealand followed by the Grammy Awards performance where Brooks arranged and conducted a live orchestra on Chance the Rapper’s version of How Great is Our God by Chris Tomlin. Brooksalso arranged, produced, and recorded new projects for German artist Deborah Rosenkranz, Italian artist Jonathan Cilia Faro, veteran singer Crystal Lewis, and the Saddleback Worship Team. He performed in Brasil with Ron Kenoly and toured Europe, Israel, and the US with Alan Parsons.

Brooks conducted the Clearwater Symphony and the Mexico City Philharmonic in 2018 while touring South America, Europe, and throughout the US with The Alan Parsons Project. He performed with David Foster, Steve Vai, Katharine McPhee, Alan Parsons, and Sisterhood, along with Katy Perry, Kenny Loggins, Wilson Phillips, and Richard Marx at the "Kick Ash Bash"; a fund-raising concert event to assist victims of the Santa Barbara/Montecito fire and mudslide disaster. He performed with Parsons along with The Moody Blues, The Zombies, and Ambrosia on the Moody Blues Cruise, while producing studio projects for Chance the Rapper, the MistleTones, Peter Cottontale, Phat Cat Swinger, Disney, David Pack, the All-American Boys Chorus, and the Art & Science of Sound Recording.

== Accolades ==
6 Platinum Albums certified by the RIAA including WOW Worship-Blue", and Songs4Worship.

12 Gold Albums certified by the RIAA including Give Thanks featuring Don Moen and Lift Him Up featuring Ron Kenoly.

Latin Grammy Award for Best Christian Album for his work as producer alongside Josué Pineda on Marcos Vidal – 25 Años.

GMA Dove Award for Welcome Home featuring Ron Kenoly.

== Discography (partial) ==
The Secret – Alan Parsons

- Released: 2019
- Label: Frontiers Music
- Producer: Alan Parsons, Tom Brooks, arranger, orchestrator, conductor, keyboards

Lift Him Up – Ron Kenoly

- Released: 1992 – recorded live in Virginia Beach VA
- Label: Integrity, Hosanna! Music, Word
- Producer: Tom Brooks, producer, arranger, engineer, keyboards
- Certification: Gold Album-RIAA

Give Thanks – Don Moen

- Released: 1986 – recorded live in Mobile AL
- Label: Integrity Music, Hosanna! Music, Sparrow, Epic, Sony
- Producer: Tom Brooks, producer, arranger, engineer, keyboards
- Certification: Gold Album-RIAA

Songs 4 Worship – Shout to the Lord

- Released: 2000
- Label: Integrity, Hosanna! Music
- Producer: Tom Brooks, producer, arranger, engineer, keyboards
- Certification: Double Platinum Album-RIAA

God Is Able – Ron Kenoly

- Released: 1994 – recorded live in Atlanta GA
- Label: Integrity, Hosanna! Music, Integrity Asia, Columbia, Sony
- Producer: Tom Brooks, producer, arranger, engineer, keyboards
- Certification: Gold Album-RIAA

Marcos Vidal – 25 Años

- Released: 2016
- Label: Canzion
- Producer: Tom Brooks, producer, arranger, engineer, keyboards
- Certification: Latin Grammy Award for "Best Christian Album" 2016

Sing Out – Ron Kenoly

- Released: 1995 – recorded live in Lakeland FL
- Label: Integrity, Hosanna! Music, Integrity Asia, Columbia, Sony
- Producer: Tom Brooks, producer, arranger, engineer, keyboards
- Certification: Gold Album-RIAA

WOW Worship Blue – Various Artists

- Released: 1999
- Label: Integrity Music, Hosanna! Music, Sparrow, Epic, Sony
- Producer: Tom Brooks, producer, arranger, engineer, keyboards
- Certification: Double Platinum Album-RIAA

Welcome Home – Ron Kenoly

- Released: 1996 – recorded live in San Jose CA
- Label: Integrity, Hosanna! Music, Integrity Asia, Columbia, Sony
- Producer: Tom Brooks, producer, arranger, engineer, keyboards
- Certification: Dove Award

iWorship

- Released: 2002
- Label: Integrity, Hosanna! Music
- Producer: Tom Brooks, producer, arranger, engineer, keyboards
- Certification: Platinum Album-RIAA

WOW Worship Orange

- Released: 2000
- Label: Integrity, Hosanna! Music
- Producer: Tom Brooks, producer, arranger, engineer, keyboards
- Certification: Platinum Album-RIAA

What a Mighty God – Ron Tucker / Grace World Outreach Center

- Released: 1981 – recorded live in St. Louis MO
- Label: Grace Records
- Producer: Tom Brooks & Kent Henry

O Magnify the Lord – Ron Tucker / Grace World Outreach Center

- Released: 1982 – recorded live in St. Louis MO
- Label: Grace Records
- Producer: Tom Brooks & Kent Henry

Behold His Majesty – Ron Tucker / Grace World Outreach Center

- Released: 1982 – recorded live in St. Louis MO
- Label: Grace Records
- Producer: Tom Brooks, producer, arranger, engineer, keyboards

Behold His Majesty – Ron Tucker

- Released: 1983 – recorded live in St. Louis MO (Reissue)
- Label: Integrity Music, Hosanna! Music
- Producer: Tom Brooks, producer, arranger, engineer, keyboards

Super Gang!

- Released: 1983
- Label: StarSong Records
- Producer: Tom Brooks, producer, arranger, engineer, keyboards, songwriter

Glory to the Lamb – Ron Tucker

- Released: 1984 – recorded live in St. Louis MO
- Label: Grace Records
- Producer: Tom Brooks, producer, arranger, engineer, keyboards

Super Gang! On the Road for Jesus

- Released: 1984
- Label: StarSong Records
- Producer: Tom Brooks, producer, arranger, engineer, keyboards, songwriter

All Hail King Jesus – Kent Henry

- Released: 1985 – recorded live in St. Louis MO
- Label: Integrity Music, Hosanna! Music
- Producer: Tom Brooks, producer, arranger, engineer, keyboards
- Certification: Gold Album-RIAA

All Hail King Jesus – Ron Tucker / Grace World Outreach Center

- Released: 1985 – recorded live in St. Louis MO
- Label: Grace Records
- Producer: Tom Brooks, producer, arranger, engineer, keyboards

The Secret Place: A Worship Album – Grace World Outreach Center (feat. Kent Henry, Leann Albrecht, Jeff Hamlin, Damon Lovelace and others)

- Released: 1985
- Label: Grace Records
- Producer: Tom Brooks, producer, arranger, engineer, keyboards

Super Gang! Lift Jesus Up

- Released: 1985
- Label: StarSong Records
- Producer: Tom Brooks, producer, arranger, engineer, keyboards, songwriter

Can't Stop Praising His Name – Bill & Reneé Morris

- Released: 1986 – recorded live in St. Louis MO at Grace World Outreach Center
- Label: Grace Records
- Producer: Tom Brooks

To Him Who Sits on the Throne – Charlie LeBlanc

- Released: 1986
- Label: Integrity Music, Hosanna! Music
- Producer: Tom Brooks, producer, arranger, engineer, keyboards

Glory to the King – Lamar Boschman

- Released: 1986
- Label: Integrity Music, Hosanna! Music
- Producer: Tom Brooks, producer, arranger, engineer, keyboards

I Exalt Thee – Pete Sanchez

- Released: 1986 – recorded live in Houston TX
- Label: Integrity Music, Hosanna! Music
- Producer: Tom Brooks, producer, arranger, engineer, keyboards

Glorify Thy Name – Kent Henry

- Released: 1986 – recorded live in St. Louis MO
- Label: Integrity Music, Hosanna! Music
- Producer: Tom Brooks, producer, arranger, engineer, keyboards

You Are My God – Ron Tucker / Grace World Outreach Center

- Released: 1986 – recorded live in St. Louis MO
- Label: Integrity Music, Hosanna! Music, Grace Records
- Producer: Tom Brooks, producer, arranger, engineer, keyboards

You Are My God – Jeff Hamlin

- Released: 1986 – recorded live in St. Louis MO (Reissue / Alternate)
- Label: Integrity Music, Hosanna! Music
- Producer: Tom Brooks, producer, arranger, engineer, keyboards

Praise and Honor – Daniel Gardner

- Released: 1987 – recorded live in Clawson MI
- Label: Integrity Music, Hosanna! Music
- Producer: Tom Brooks, producer, arranger, engineer, keyboards

I Will Rejoice – David Butterbaugh

- Released: 1987 – recorded live in Dallas TX
- Label: Integrity Music, Hosanna! Music
- Producer: Tom Brooks, producer, arranger, engineer, keyboards

Arise and Sing – David Grothe

- Released: 1987 – recorded live in Tulsa OK
- Label: Integrity Music, Hosanna! Music
- Producer: Tom Brooks, producer, arranger, engineer, keyboards

Mighty Warrior – Randy Rothwell

- Released: 1987 – recorded live in Mobile AL
- Label: Integrity Music, Hosanna! Music
- Producer: Tom Brooks, producer, arranger, engineer, keyboards

Lamb of God – Jim Gilbert

- Released: 1987
- Label: Integrity Music, Hosanna! Music
- Producer: Tom Brooks, producer, arranger, engineer, keyboards

In His Presence – Kent Henry

- Released: 1987 – recorded live in St. Louis MO
- Label: Integrity Music, Hosanna! Music
- Producer: Tom Brooks, producer, arranger, engineer, keyboards

Steadfast Love – Don Moen

- Released: 1988 – recorded live in Mobile AL
- Label: Integrity Music, Hosanna! Music, Sparrow, Epic, Sony
- Producer: Tom Brooks, producer, arranger, engineer, keyboards

Experience Peace – Instrumental

- Released: 1988
- Label: Integrity Music, Hosanna! Music, Sparrow, Epic, Sony
- Producer: Tom Brooks, producer, arranger, engineer, keyboards, artist

His Word – David W. Morris

- Released: 1988 – recorded live in Mobile AL
- Label: Integrity Music, Hosanna! Music, Sparrow, Epic, Sony
- Producer: Tom Brooks, producer, arranger, engineer, keyboards

Forever Grateful – Marty Nystrom

- Released: 1988 – recorded live in Covina CA
- Label: Integrity Music, Hosanna! Music, Sparrow, Epic, Sony
- Producer: Tom Brooks, producer, arranger, engineer, keyboards

The Solid Rock – Joseph Garlington

- Released: 1988 – recorded live in Pittsburgh PA
- Label: Integrity Music, Hosanna! Music, Sparrow, Epic, Sony
- Producer: Tom Brooks, producer, arranger, engineer, keyboards

Experience Joy – Instrumental

- Released: 1988
- Label: Integrity Music, Hosanna! Music, Sparrow, Epic, Sony
- Producer: Tom Brooks, producer, arranger, engineer, keyboards, artist

Army of God – Randy Rothwell

- Released: 1988 – recorded live in Mobile AL
- Label: Integrity Music, Hosanna! Music, Sparrow, Epic, Sony
- Producer: Tom Brooks, producer, arranger, engineer, keyboards

Lord of All – Charlie LeBlanc

- Released: 1988 – recorded live in St. Louis MO
- Label: Integrity Music, Hosanna! Music, Sparrow, Epic, Sony
- Producer: Tom Brooks, producer, arranger, engineer, keyboards

Experience Love – Instrumental

- Released: 1988
- Label: Integrity Music, Hosanna! Music, Sparrow, Epic, Sony
- Producer: Tom Brooks, producer, arranger, engineer, keyboards, artist

Enter His Gates – Marty Nystrom

- Released: 1988 – recorded live in Loveland CO
- Label: Integrity Music, Hosanna! Music, Sparrow, Epic, Sony
- Producer: Tom Brooks, producer, arranger, engineer, keyboards

The Lord Reigns – Bob Fitts

- Released: 1989 – recorded live at the YWAM Base, Kona HI
- Label: Integrity Music, Hosanna! Music, Sparrow, Epic, Sony
- Producer: Tom Brooks, producer, arranger, engineer, keyboards

Your Love – Various Artists

- Released: 1989
- Label: Integrity Music, Hosanna! Music, Alleluia Music, Sparrow, Epic, Sony
- Producer: Tom Brooks, producer, arranger, engineer, keyboards

Bless the Lord – Don Moen

- Released: 1989
- Label: Integrity Music, Hosanna! Music, Sparrow, Epic, Sony
- Producer: Tom Brooks, producer, arranger, engineer, keyboards

Mighty God – J. Daniel Smith

- Released: 1989 – recorded live in Ft. Worth TX
- Label: Integrity Music, Hosanna! Music, Sparrow, Epic, Sony
- Producer: Tom Brooks, producer, arranger, engineer, keyboards

My Refuge – Kent Henry

- Released: 1989 – recorded live in St. Louis MO
- Label: Integrity Music, Hosanna! Music, Sparrow, Epic, Sony
- Producer: Tom Brooks, producer, arranger, engineer, keyboards

Experience Mercy – Instrumental

- Released: 1989
- Label: Integrity Music, Hosanna! Music, Sparrow, Epic, Sony
- Producer: Tom Brooks, producer, arranger, engineer, keyboards, artist

We Have Overcome – Virgil Meares

- Released: 1989 – recorded live in Washington DC
- Label: Integrity Music, Hosanna! Music, Sparrow, Epic, Sony
- Producer: Tom Brooks, producer, arranger, engineer, keyboards

Victor's Crown – Robert Gay

- Released: 1989 – recorded live in Ft. Walton Beach FL
- Label: Integrity Music, Hosanna! Music, Sparrow, Epic, Sony
- Producer: Tom Brooks, producer, arranger, engineer, keyboards

Arise Oh God – Lamar Boschman

- Released: 1990 – recorded live in Norfolk VA
- Label: Integrity Music, Hosanna! Music, Sparrow, Epic, Sony
- Producer: Tom Brooks, producer, arranger, engineer, keyboards

Amazing Love – Graham Kendrick

- Released: 1990 – recorded live in Glasgow Scotland
- Label: Integrity Music, Hosanna! Music, Sparrow, Epic, Sony
- Producer: Tom Brooks, producer, arranger, engineer, keyboards

Experience Grace – Instrumental

- Released: 1990
- Label: Integrity Music, Hosanna! Music, Sparrow, Epic, Sony
- Producer: Tom Brooks, producer, arranger, engineer, keyboards, artist

Exalt the Lord – Eugene Greco

- Released: 1990 – recorded live in Smithtown NY
- Label: Integrity Music, Hosanna! Music, Sparrow, Epic, Sony
- Producer: Tom Brooks and Jeff Hamlin

See His Glory – Billy Funk

- Released: 1990 – recorded live in Vancouver BC, Canada
- Label: Integrity Music, Hosanna! Music, Sparrow, Epic, Sony
- Producer: Tom Brooks, producer, arranger, engineer, keyboards

Shouts of Joy – Ed Gungor

- Released: 1990 – recorded live in Marshfield WI
- Label: Integrity Music, Hosanna! Music, Sparrow, Epic, Sony
- Producer: Tom Brooks and Jeff Hamlin

Christmas – Various Artists

- Released: 1990
- Label: Integrity Music, Hosanna! Music, Sparrow, Epic, Sony
- Producer: Tom Brooks, producer, arranger, engineer, keyboards

Worship the King – Randy Rothwell

- Released: 1990 – recorded live in Mobile AL
- Label: Integrity Music, Hosanna! Music, Sparrow, Epic, Sony
- Producer: Tom Brooks, producer, arranger, engineer, keyboards

Eternal God – Don Moen

- Released: 1990 – recorded live in Arden Hills MN
- Label: Integrity Music, Hosanna! Music, Sparrow, Epic, Sony
- Producer: Tom Brooks, producer, arranger, engineer, keyboards

Jesus Is Alive – Ron Kenoly

- Released: 1991 – recorded live in San Jose, CA
- Label: Integrity Music,

Hosanna! Music, Sparrow, Epic, Sony

- Producer: Tom Brooks, producer, arranger, engineer, keyboards

Come to the Table – Marty Nystrom

- Released: 1991 – recorded live in Seattle WA
- Label: Integrity Music, Hosanna! Music, Sparrow, Epic, Sony
- Producer: Tom Brooks and Jeff Hamlin

Experience Hope – Instrumental

- Released: 1991
- Label: Integrity Music, Hosanna! Music, Sparrow, Epic, Sony
- Producer: Tom Brooks, producer, arranger, engineer, keyboards, artist

Pure Heart – Lenny LeBlanc

- Released: 1991 – recorded live in Florence AL
- Label: Integrity Music, Hosanna! Music, Sparrow, Epic, Sony
- Producer: Tom Brooks, producer, arranger, engineer, keyboards

Crown Him – Graham Kendrick

- Released: 1991 – recorded live in Los Angeles, CA
- Label: Integrity Music, Hosanna! Music, Sparrow, Epic, Sony
- Producer: Tom Brooks, producer, arranger, engineer, keyboards

The Highest Place – Bob Fitts

- Released: 1991 – recorded live at the YWAM Base in Kona HI
- Label: Integrity Music, Hosanna! Music, Sparrow, Epic, Sony
- Producer: Tom Brooks, producer, arranger, engineer, keyboards

Chosen Treasure – Bob Kauflin

- Released: 1992 – recorded live in Washington DC
- Label: Integrity Music, Hosanna! Music, Sparrow, Epic, Sony
- Producer: Tom Brooks, producer, arranger, engineer, keyboards

All Nations Worship – Mark Conner

- Released: 1992 – recorded live in Melbourne Australia
- Label: Integrity, Hosanna! Music, Word
- Producer: Tom Brooks, producer, arranger, engineer, keyboards

Take the City – Rusty Nelson

- Released: 1992 – recorded live in Metarie LA
- Label: Integrity, Hosanna! Music, Word
- Producer: Tom Brooks, producer, arranger, engineer, keyboards

All Hail the Power – David Ritter

- Released: 1992 – recorded live in Phoenix AZ
- Label: Integrity, Hosanna! Music, Word
- Producer: Tom Brooks, producer, arranger, engineer, keyboards

Praise Aerobics – Longform Video

- Released: 1992
- Label: Integrity, Hosanna! Music, Sony
- Producer: Tom Brooks, producer, arranger, engineer, keyboards
- Certification: Gold Album-RIAA

Worship with Don Moen

- Released: 1992
- Label: Integrity, Hosanna! Music, Word
- Producer: Tom Brooks, producer, arranger, engineer, keyboards

He Is Faithful – Paul Baloche

- Released: 1992 – recorded live in Dallas TX
- Label: Integrity, Hosanna! Music, Word
- Producer: Tom Brooks, producer, arranger, engineer, keyboards

Te Exaltamos – Marcos Witt

- Released: 1992 – recorded live in Ciudad Juarez, Mexico
- Label: Integrity, Hosanna! Music, Word
- Producer: Tom Brooks, producer, arranger, engineer, keyboards

Almighty – Rich Gomez

- Released: 1992 – recorded live in Elizabeth NJ
- Label: Integrity, Hosanna! Music, Word
- Producer: Tom Brooks, producer, arranger, engineer, keyboards

Lift Him Up – Ron Kenoly – Longform Video

- Released: 1992
- Label: Integrity, Hosanna! Music, Sony
- Producer: Tom Brooks, producer, arranger, engineer, keyboards
- Certification: Gold Album-RIAA

The Secret Place – Kent Henry

- Released: 1993 – recorded live in St. Louis MO
- Label: Integrity, Hosanna! Music, Word
- Producer: Tom Brooks, producer, arranger, engineer, keyboards

Bless My Little Girl – Kelly Willard

- Released: 1993
- Label: Integrity, Hosanna! Music, Columbia, Sony
- Producer: Tom Brooks, producer, arranger, engineer, keyboards

Rejoice Africa – Lionel Petersen

- Released: 1993 – recorded live in Johannesburg South Africa
- Label: Integrity, Hosanna! Music, Word
- Producer: Tom Brooks, producer, arranger, engineer, keyboards

Proclaim His Power – Bob Fitts

- Released: 1993 – recorded live in Nashville TN
- Label: Integrity, Hosanna! Music, Word
- Producer: Tom Brooks, producer, arranger, engineer, keyboards

We Are One – Tom Inglis

- Released: 1993 – recorded live in Johannesburg South Africa
- Label: Integrity, Hosanna! Music, Word
- Producer: Tom Brooks, producer, arranger, engineer, keyboards

Bless My Little Boy – Rita Baloche

- Released: 1993
- Label: Integrity, Hosanna! Music, Columbia, Sony
- Producer: Tom Brooks, producer, arranger, engineer, keyboards

As for My House – Rick & Cathy Riso

- Released: 1994 – recorded live in Van Nuys CA
- Label: Integrity, Hosanna! Music, Word
- Producer: Tom Brooks, producer, arranger, engineer, keyboards

Holy Ground – Geron Davis

- Released: 1994 – recorded live in Alexandria LA
- Label: Integrity, Hosanna! Music, Word
- Producer: Tom Brooks, producer, arranger, engineer, keyboards

Glorificate-Juan Carlos Alvarado

- Released: 1994 – recorded live in Guatemala City, Guatemala
- Label: Integrity, Hosanna! Music, Word
- Producer: Tom Brooks, producer, arranger, engineer, keyboards

God Is Able – Ron Kenoly – Longform Video

- Released: 1994 – recorded live in Atlanta GA
- Label: Integrity, Hosanna! Music, Integrity Asia, Columbia, Sony
- Producer: Tom Brooks, producer, arranger, engineer, keyboards
- Certification: Gold Album-RIAA

I Love You – A Mother's Heart – Bobbi White-Page

- Released: 1994
- Label: Integrity, Hosanna! Music, Columbia, Sony
- Producer: Tom Brooks, producer, arranger, engineer, keyboards

Revive Us Again – Alvin Slaughter

- Released: 1994 – recorded live in Cleveland, TN
- Label: Integrity, Hosanna! Music, Integrity Asia, Columbia, Sony
- Producer: Tom Brooks, producer, arranger, engineer, keyboards

Uno de Nosotros – Frank Giraldo

- Released: 1994 – recorded live in Los Angeles, CA
- Label: Integrity, Hosanna! Music, Word
- Producer: Tom Brooks, producer, arranger, engineer, keyboards

Men in Worship – Jack Hayford

- Released: 1995 – recorded live in Van Nuys CA
- Label: Integrity, Hosanna! Music, Integrity Asia, Columbia, Sony
- Producer: Tom Brooks, producer, arranger, engineer, keyboards

Poderoso Dios – Marco Barrientos

- Released: 1995 – recorded live in Mexico City, Mexico
- Label: Integrity, Hosanna! Music, Word
- Producer: Tom Brooks, producer, arranger, engineer, keyboards

Rivers of Joy – Don Moen

- Released: 1995 – recorded live in Colorado Springs CO
- Label: Integrity Music, Hosanna! Music, Sony
- Producer: Tom Brooks and Don Harris, producer, arranger, guitar, keyboards, background vocalist

Sing Out – Ron Kenoly – Longform Video

- Released: 1995 – recorded live in Lakeland FL
- Label: Integrity, Hosanna! Music, Integrity Asia, Columbia, Sony
- Producer: Tom Brooks, producer, arranger, engineer, keyboards
- Certification: Gold Album-RIAA

Experience Victory – Instrumental

- Released: 1995
- Label: Integrity Music, Hosanna! Music, Sparrow, Epic, Sony
- Producer: Tom Brooks, producer, arranger, engineer, keyboards, artist

Celebra al Señor – Danilo Monero

- Released: 1995 – recorded live in San Jose, Costa Rica
- Label: Integrity, Hosanna! Music, Word
- Producer: Tom Brooks, producer, arranger, engineer, keyboards

Praise with Don Moen

- Released: 1996
- Label: Integrity, Hosanna! Music, Integrity Asia, Columbia, Sony
- Producer: Tom Brooks and Don Harris

Eres Señor – Jaime Murrell

- Released: 1996 – recorded live in Miami, FL
- Label: Integrity, Hosanna! Music, Word
- Producer: Tom Brooks, producer, arranger, engineer, keyboards

High Places – The Best of Ron Kenoly

- Released: 1997
- Label: Integrity, Hosanna! Music, Integrity Asia, Columbia, Sony
- Producer: Tom Brooks, producer, arranger, engineer, keyboards

Let Your Glory Fall – Don Moen

- Released: 1997
- Label: Integrity, Hosanna! Music, Columbia, Sony
- Producer: Tom Brooks, producer, arranger, engineer, keyboards

Majesty – Ron Kenoly

- Released: 1998
- Label: Integrity, Hosanna! Music, Columbia, Sony
- Producer: Tom Brooks, producer, arranger, engineer, keyboards

God Is Good – Worship with Don Moen

- Released: 1998
- Label: Integrity, Hosanna! Music, Columbia, Sony
- Producer: Tom Brooks, producer, arranger, engineer, keyboards

We Offer Praises – Ron Kenoly

- Released: 1999
- Label: Integrity, Hosanna! Music, Columbia, Sony
- Producer: Tom Brooks, producer, arranger, engineer, keyboards

En Tu Presencia – Don Moen

- Released: 1999
- Label: Integrity, Hosanna! Music, Columbia, Sony
- Producer: Tom Brooks, Isaac Hernandez, Don Harris

More of You, Lord – Praise with Don Moen Volume 2 (compilation)

- Released: 1999
- Label: Integrity, Hosanna! Music, Integrity Asia
- Producer: Tom Brooks, Darlene Zschech, Russell Fragar, Don Harris, Chris Springer

Give Thanks – Video – Don Moen

- Released: 1999
- Label: Integrity, Hosanna! Music, Integrity Asia
- Producer: Tom Brooks, Mark Gasbarro, Steve Merkel

The Mercy Seat – Don Moen

- Released: 2000
- Label: Integrity, Hosanna! Music, Integrity Asia, Columbia, Sony
- Producer: Tom Brooks, producer, arranger, engineer, keyboards

Songs 4 Worship – Holy Ground

- Released: 2000
- Label: Integrity, Hosanna! Music, Sony
- Producer: Tom Brooks, producer, arranger, engineer, keyboards
- Certification: Gold Album-RIAA

Heal Our Land – Don Moen and Paul Wilbur

- Released: 2000
- Label: Integrity, Hosanna! Music, Integrity Asia
- Producer: Tom Brooks, producer, arranger, engineer, keyboards, songwriter

WOW Worship Green

- Released: 2001
- Label: Integrity, Hosanna! Music, Sony
- Producer: Tom Brooks, producer, arranger, engineer, keyboards
- Certification: Gold Album-RIAA

Songs 4 Worship – Be Glorified

- Released: 2001
- Label: Integrity, Hosanna! Music, Sony
- Producer: Tom Brooks, producer, arranger, engineer, keyboards
- Certification: Gold Album-RIAA

Alabanza y Adoracion – Marcos Vidal

- Released: 2002 – recorded live in Madrid Spain
- Label: Canzion
- Producer: Tom Brooks, producer, arranger, engineer, keyboards

Songs for a Purpose Driven Life – Rick Warren

- Released: 2002
- Label: Zondervan
- Producer: Tom Brooks, keyboards

American Worship Gathering – Various Artists

- Released: 2002 – recorded live at the Washington Monument
- Label: Worship Alliance
- Producer: Tom Brooks, producer, arranger, engineer, keyboards

God Will Make a Way: The Best of Don Moen

- Released: 2003
- Label: Integrity, Hosanna! Music, Epic, Sony
- Producer: Tom Brooks, Don Harris, Paul Mills

Abe Laboriel & Friends – Live in Switzerland

- Released: 2003
- Label: Integrity, Hosanna! Music, Epic, Sony
- Producer: Tom Brooks, Abe Laboriel, Paul Jackson Jr, Vinnie Colaiuta

Trono de Gracia – Don Moen

- Released: 2003
- Label: Integrity, Hosanna! Music, Epic, Sony
- Producer: Tom Brooks, Miguel Angel "Malin" Villagran, Paul Mills

The Lift Him Up Collection – Ron Kenoly

- Released: 2005
- Label: Integrity, Hosanna! Music, Columbia, Sony
- Producer: Tom Brooks, producer, arranger, engineer, keyboards

Above All: Ultimate Worship Anthems – Various Artists

- Released: 2006
- Label: Integrity, Hosanna! Music, Columbia, Sony
- Producer: Tom Brooks, Don Harris, Paul Mills, Don Moen

Holiday Magic – Musical Theatre Academy

- Released: 2007
- Label: Worship Alliance
- Producer: Tom Brooks, producer, arranger, engineer, keyboards

Everlasting Love – Lucia Parker

- Released: 2008
- Label: Worship Alliance
- Producer: Tom Brooks, producer, arranger, engineer, keyboards

Christmas with Ron Kenoly

- Released: 2010
- Label: Worship Alliance
- Producer: Tom Brooks, producer, arranger, engineer, keyboards

Come Away – Morris Chapman

- Released: 2010
- Label: Worship Alliance
- Producer: Tom Brooks, producer, arranger, engineer, keyboards

With a Thankful Heart: The Best of Don Moen

- Released: 2011
- Label: Integrity, Hosanna! Music, Integrity Asia
- Producer: Tom Brooks, David Hamilton, Don Harris, Paul Mills, Don Moen

Christmas: A Love Story – Lucia Parker

- Released: 2011
- Label: Worship Alliance
- Producer: Tom Brooks, producer, arranger, engineer, keyboards

Navidad: Una Historia de Amor – Lucia Parker

- Released: 2011
- Label: Worship Alliance
- Producer: Tom Brooks, producer, arranger, engineer, keyboards

25 Songs that Changed the Way We Worship – Various Artists

- Released: 2012
- Label: Integrity, Hosanna! Music, Columbia, Sony
- Producer: Tom Brooks, Don Harris, Paul Mills, Don Moen

Hymns of Peace – Tom Brooks & Friends

- Released: 2012
- Label: Worship Alliance
- Producer: Tom Brooks, producer, arranger, engineer, keyboards, artist

Ultimate Collection – Don Moen

- Released: 2013
- Label: Integrity, Hosanna! Music, Columbia, Sony
- Producer: Tom Brooks, David Hamilton, Paul Mills, Steve Merkel, Don Moen

Celebrate Christmas – Tom Brooks & Friends

- Released: 2013
- Label: Worship Alliance
- Producer: Tom Brooks, producer, arranger, engineer, keyboards

My Treasure – Bob Fitts

- Released: 2014
- Label: Worship Alliance
- Producer: Tom Brooks, producer, arranger, engineer, keyboards

Vivo Estas – Aline Barros

- Released: 2015
- Label: Sony
- Producer: Tom Brooks, producer, arranger, engineer, keyboards, Tiago Costa, co-producer

Rey de Mi Universo – Lucia Parker

- Released: 2015
- Label: Columbia
- Producer: Israel Houghton, Tom Brooks

Small Batch Bourbon – The Tim Gill All-Stars

- Released: 2015
- Label: Universal Music
- Producer: Tim Gill, Tom Brooks, engineer

Oceans of Melodies – Brandon Muchow

- Released: 2015
- Producer: Brandon Muchow, Tom Brooks, keyboards, mastering

A Swingin' Little Christmas – Jane Lynch

- Released: 2016
- Label: Columbia
- Producer: Tony Guerrero, Tim Davis, Tom Brooks, engineer

Live in Columbia – The Alan Parsons Symphonic Project

- Released: 2016
- Label: Ear Music
- Producer: Alan Parsons, PJ Olsson, engineer, vocals, Tom Brooks, keyboards, vocals
