= God Can =

God Can!

Live album by Alvin Slaughter
- Released: 1996
- Recorded: Upper Room Ministries, Dix Hills, New York
- Genre: Contemporary worship music
- Length: 65:04
- Label: Integrity/Hosanna! Music/Epic/Sparrow Records
- Producer: Tom Brooks, Michael Coleman (Senior Executive), Don Moen (Executive), Chris Long (Executive)

Alvin Slaughter chronology
Revive Us Again (1995)	God Can! (1996)	Yes (1997)

God Can! is a gospel album by American worship leader and singer Alvin Slaughter, released in 1996 by Integrity Music. The album was recorded live at Upper Room Ministries in Dix Hills, New York, capturing the live performance's raw energy and spiritual fervor. Featuring a talented ensemble of musicians, including musical arranger and keyboardist Tom Brooks and bassist Abraham Laboriel, God Can blends contemporary gospel with traditional influences. The album's powerful arrangements and Slaughter's commanding vocals deliver a heartfelt collection of worship anthems and ballads designed to inspire faith and uplift listeners.

Product ID Number
Title	CD	Tape	Video
God Can!	08962CD	08964	08963

== Track listing ==
1. Shouts Of Joy – 4:05
2. God Can – 3:45
3. More Than Enough – 3:35
4. Doin' A Good Work – 3:45
5. Holy, Holy, Holy – 8:23
6. Our Help Is In The Name Of The Lord – 3:31
7. God Gives His Children A Song – 5:55
8. That's When – 4:51
9. Jesus, Lord To Me – 3:02
10. Alleluia – 6:06
11. Jesus Is Everything I Need – 1:38
12. He's All I Need – 2:12
13. The Wonders Of His Hands – 4:13
14. I Love You Lord – 1:58
15. You Are Worthy To Be Praised – 2:28
16. When We All Get to Heaven – 5:40

In total 65:04

== Credits ==
Producer and Arranger:

- Tom Brooks

Senior Executive Producer:

- Michael Coleman

Executive Producers:

- Don Moen
- Chris Long

A&R Director:

- Chris Thomason

Worship Leader:

- Alvin Slaughter

Musicians:

- Carl Albrecht – Drums
- Abraham Laboriel – Bass
- Tom Brooks – Keyboards
- Phil Hamilton – Guitars

Vocals:

- Gary Anglin – Vocals
- Vanessa Bille – Vocals
- Marshall Carpenter – Vocals
- Sheila Ravenel Carpenter – Vocals
- Larry Felder – Vocals
- Marissa Felder – Vocals
- Lisette Gonzalez – Vocals
- Frank Lorenzo – Vocals
- Jo-Ann Rivera – Vocals
- Denise Towers – Vocals
- Rebecca West – Vocals

Choir:

- Hosanna! Music Mass Choir – Choir, Chorus
- Sheila Ravenel Carpenter – Choir Coordinator
- Theresa Mensianti – Choir Director

Engineers:

- Glenn "Zippy" Montjoy – Audio Technical Assistant
- Phil Gitomer – Assistant, Assistant Remote Engineer
- David Hewitt – Engineer, Remote Recording
- Tom Brooks – Mixing
- Ken Love – Mastering
- Keith Kutcha – Mixing
