= The Language of Music (theory book) =

- Cover of the 2012 Hal Leonard Publishing edition
- Author: Tom Brooks
- Language: English
- Subject: Music
- Published: 2012
- Publication place: United States
- Media type: Print
- Pages: 254
- ISBN: 978-1-45840-294-3
- Website: tombrooksmusic.com-->

The Language of Music (2012) is a contemporary music theory book written by Tom Brooks and published by Hal Leonard Publishing. The book explains principles used in modern music starting at a foundational level (Basic Building Blocks of Music) and progressing to topics such as Chord Building, Transposition, Cadences, Modes, and Chord Substitution. The book also demonstrates concepts using well known pop/rock song examples. It is used as a textbook by college level music theory programs. The book also includes a quick start guide, a chord library appendix, and a DVD with 38 video tutorials by the author.

== Table of Contents ==
1. The Basic Building Blocks of Music

2. Foundational Structures

3. Basic Harmony

4. The Framework

5. Chord “Personalities”

6. The Minor Scale

7. The Anatomy of a Chord Chart

8. Harmony: The Next Step

9. Chord Relationships 201

10. Scales: Beyond Major and Minor

11. Harmony: Outside the Box

12. Making Music “Musical”: From Theory to Live Performance

== Topics ==
The book is divided into 38 individual Lessons covering topics such as pitch, rhythm, time signatures, the major scale, key signatures, the Circle of Fifths, triad inversion, and 7th chords. The writing is geared toward pop/rock. Areas of focus include familiar pop chord progressions, chord symbols, reading & writing modern chord charts and the Nashville Number System. More advanced topics include modulation, the blues scale, extended chords, altered chords, and borrowed chords used in jazz and gospel music, plus practice and rehearsal tips.

== Reception ==
Singer-Songwriter Don Moen of Integrity Music is quoted as saying, “The Language of Music takes the mystery out of music theory and explains it in a very clear, practical, straightforward way”. Musician Abraham Laboriel states, “…more than just practical music theory, this book is an outpouring of the heart and spirit…”. Rick Muchow, music director of Saddleback Church says, “…this is a guidebook to modern music theory that every musician needs”.
