= Give Thanks with a Grateful Heart =

Christian worship song

"Give Thanks with a Grateful Heart" or simply Give Thanks is an American Christian worship song written by Henry Smith in 1978.

== History ==
"Give Thanks with a Grateful Heart" was written in 1978 by Henry Smith. The song was his only published worship song out of 300 unpublished compositions. It was written after Smith had trouble finding work after graduating from university. He also suffered from a degenerative condition that eventually left him legally blind. While at his church in Williamsburg, Virginia, his pastor inspired him with a reference to how Jesus made himself poor to make others rich through him. When Smith started performing the song in church, a visiting United States Military officer took the song to Europe, from where its popularity spread. In 1986, Integrity Music published the song on their Hosanna! Music audio cassette but credited it as "author unknown". Later that year, Don Moen released the song on his Give Thanks album. Smith contacted Integrity to inform them of his authorship and they said that they had been attempting to track him down. As a result, Smith signed a writer-publisher agreement with Integrity for distribution rights to the song.

The lyrics have been erroneously credited to Moen rather than Smith in some media reports. In the United States, the song was used by a Catholic news website to focus on returning a Christian focus to Thanksgiving celebrations. The song has also been cited by Christian authors to be used for thanksgiving and giving thanks to God.
