= Rain Down =

Rain Down may refer to:

- "Rain Down" (Delirious? song), 2003
- Rain Down (Daniel Caesar and Sampha song), 2025
- Rain Down (album), a 2000 album by Alvin Slaughter
