= Marcos Vidal =

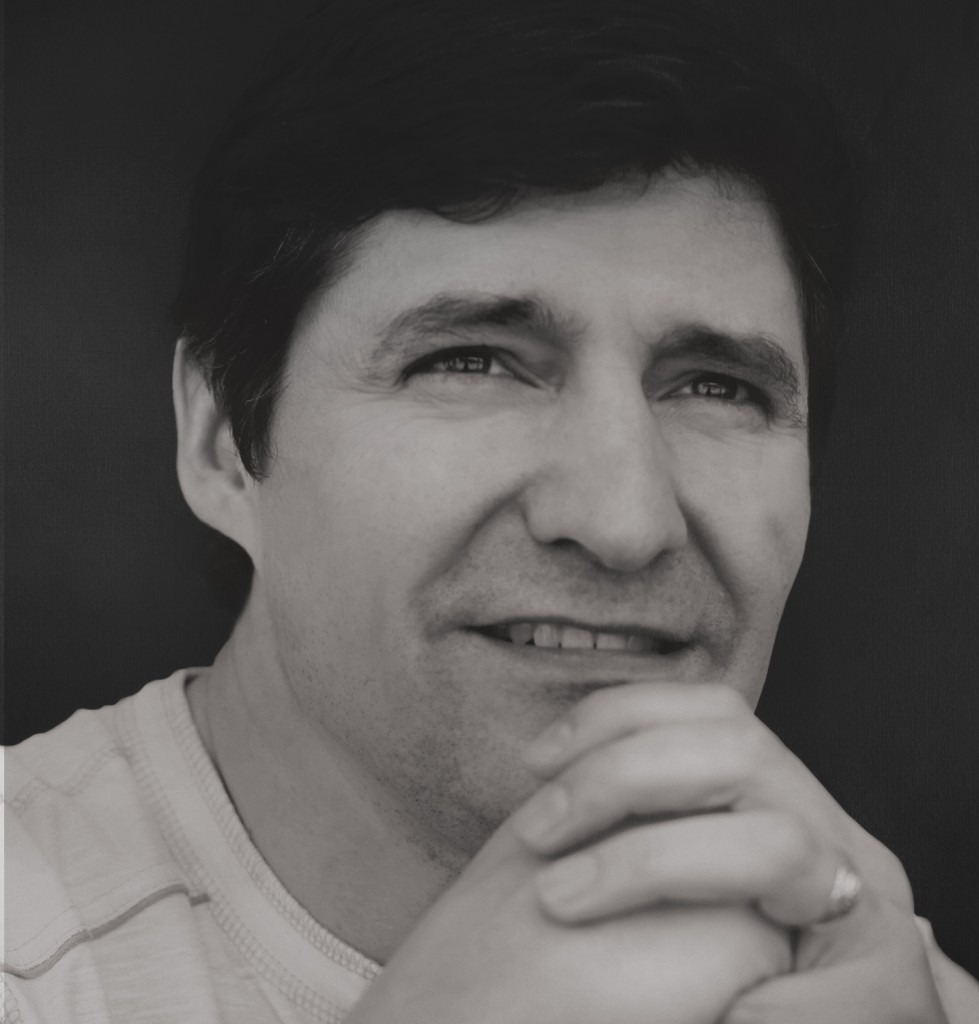
- Marcos Vidal

Background information
- Born: Marcos Vidal Roloff; December 10, 1965 (age 60); Madrid, Spain
- Origin: Madrid, Spain
- Occupations: Pastor, singer-songwriter
- Instruments: Vocals, piano
- Years active: 1990–present
- Labels: Vidal, Lifehouse, Heaven Music Group
- Website: marcosvidal.com

Marcos Vidal is a Christian music singer and songwriter. In 1997 he won the International Award GMA as the best non-English male vocalist. In 2016, he won the Latin Grammy Award for Best Christian Album at the 17th Annual Latin Grammy Awards.

== Biography ==
In 1990, at the age of 25, Marcos Vidal released his first studio album, Buscadme y Viviréis.

In 1993 he released his second studio album, Nada Especial on the Nuevos Medios label that along with the success of his first album, drew the singer to North and South America. This international recognition allowed Vidal to begin working with Sparrow Records, making Marcos Vidal the first Spanish Christian singer signed to an American label. His first two albums were later re-released in the United States under the label.

In 1996, Cara a Cara, his first album recorded for Sparrow Records, was released. It became one of the best selling Spanish Christian albums of all time, rapidly passing 100,000 albums sold. In 1997, Vidal released Mi Regalo and was nominated for his first Dove Award in the category of Best Spanish Language Album.

Por La Vida, released in 1999, was a collection of his greatest hits from previous albums.

His next project, Pescador, (2002), emphasized his passion to share the Gospel with people of all nations and was centered on the theme of being a fisherman. Alabanza y Adoración en Vivo desde España (2003), was Vidal's first live album, in which he combined traditional congregational singing with more contemporary upbeat rhythms.

Vidal currently resides in Madrid and pastors the Evangelical Church of Salem, which has led since 1992. He also continues to compose and record music. His 2016 album "25 años", produced by Tom Brooks and Josué Pineda won the Latin Grammy Award for Best Christian Album at the 17th Annual Latin Grammy Awards.

== Discography ==
Year	Title	Label
1990	Buscadme y Viviréis	Producciones Inauditas/Vida Music-Piedra Angular
1993	Nada Especial	Nuevos Medios/Vida Music-Piedra Angular
1996	Cara a cara	Sparrow/Marcos Vidal Music-Vida Music-Piedra Angular
1997	Mi Regalo	Sparrow-Piedra Angular
1999	El arca	Vidal Music-Vida Music-Piedra Angular
2001	Por la Vida	Vidal Music
2002	Pescador	Colune-Vida Music
2003	Alabanza y Adoración en Vivo	Colune-Vida Music-Nuva Music
2003	El Trio	Colune-Vida Music-Nuva Music
2004	Aire Acústico	Lifehouse Music-Vidal Music
2005	Dedicatoria	Lifehouse Music-Vidal Music
2011	Tu Nombre	Lifehouse Music-Vidal Music
2013	Sigo Esperandote	Lifehouse Music-Vidal Music
2016	25 años	Lifehouse Music-Vidal Music
