= Ron Kenoly =

American singer (1944–2026)

- Born: December 6, 1944; Coffeyville, Kansas, U.S.
- Died: February 3, 2026 (aged 81) Windermere, Florida, U.S.
- Genres: Contemporary worship music; gospel
- Occupations: Worship leader; singer; songwriter
- Instruments: Vocals; guitar
- Years active: 1968–2026
- Label: Integrity Music

Ron Kenoly (December 6, 1944 – February 3, 2026) was an American Christian worship leader, singer and songwriter.

Kenoly held several degrees including a music degree from Alameda College in Alameda, California, a Master of Divinity degree from Faith Bible College in Independence, Missouri, and a Doctorate of Ministry degree in sacred music from Friends International Christian University in Merced, California. His music career began after he left the United States Air Force. He was originally in a group called The Mellow Fellows, but situations with his family caused him to leave. His musical career breakthrough came in 1992 when Lift Him Up became the fastest selling worship album to that point. Welcome Home produced by Tom Brooks was also critically acclaimed, becoming Billboard's Top contemporary worship music album and winning a Gospel Music Association Dove Award for "Praise and Worship Album" in 1997. He was signed to Integrity Music. Kenoly himself only played music on one of his recordings.

== Early life and career ==
Kenoly was born in Coffeyville, Kansas, in southeast Kansas and grew up there. He said that when his mother, Edith Kenoly, was pregnant with him, she rubbed her stomach and prayed, "Lord, let this one praise you." He was interested in a musical career from a young age ever since seeing Sammy Davis Jr. and Nat King Cole for the first time on television.

After graduating from high school in Coffeyville, Kenoly moved to Hollywood, Los Angeles. He served in the U.S. Air Force from 1965 to 1968. During his Air Force career, Kenoly was a member of the Mellow Fellows, a top 40 cover band which toured military bases. After leaving the Air Force, he returned to Los Angeles to continue his music career. He sang demos of Jimmy Webb songs including "Up, Up and Away," for the Audio Arts label. The label also released Kenoly's first single, "The Glory of Your Love (Mine Eyes Have Seen)." He later signed with A&M Records. The label's executives gave Kenoly the stage name Ron Keith, and he recorded the R&B tracks "I Betcha I'll Get Ya," "Soul Vaccination," and 1975's "Can't Live Without You."

Kenoly and Candy Rae were the first act signed to George Semper's Inner City label. Semper remarked, "The two of them came and sang the song at my house, and I knew straight away I wanted to sign them." Their single "Lovely Weekend", recorded in 1972 at Clark Brown Audio studio in Crenshaw, Los Angeles sold nearly 200,000 copies. Kenoly later stopped recording secular music and for four years attempted to get a gospel record deal. In 1983, he released his first Christian album, You Ought to Listen to This. In early 1985, Ron attended Marin Bible College in Marin County CA. The college featured several well-known musicians including James Trumbo from the Van Morrison Band, Donna Jean Godcheaux from The Grateful Dead, David McKay from Michael Nesmith's band and Pat Craig of the Tazmanian Devils, all who had left secular music to follow Christ.. He eventually began to lead praise and worship for other pastors including Jack Hayford and Lester Sumrall catching the attention of evangelist Mario Murillo, who introduced him to Pastor Dick Bernal, the founder of Jubilee Christian Center in San Jose, California.

Kenoly began working as a full-time minister in 1985 as JCC's worship leader mainly leading worship services. In 1987, he was ordained and installed as a music pastor. In 1993, he was named Jubilee Christian Center's Ambassador of Music. He began consulting churches across the U.S. about developing their music departments. In 1996, Kenoly received his Doctorate in Ministry of Sacred Music degree. In 1999, he moved to central Florida and continued to travel, speak, sing, teach, and record until his death. He wrote books, one of which he co-authored with Pastor Dick Bernal.

Ron Kenoly was revered around the world especially in Africa.

== Personal life and death ==
Kenoly met and married his first wife Tavita while they were in the Air Force. During their 42-year marriage, they had three sons: Tony, Ronald, and Samuel. Tavita and Ron eventually separated. At Ron Kenoly's funeral, Samuel Kenoly confirmed that she was still alive.

In 2014, he married Diana; they later separated. She was not mentioned or seen at the funeral.

Kenoly died on February 3, 2026 at the age of 81.

== Discography ==
- 1991: Jesus Is Alive
- 1992: Lift Him Up
- 1994: God Is Able
- 1995: Sing Out with One Voice
- 1996: Welcome Home
- 1997: High Places: The Best of Ron Kenoly
- 1998: Majesty
- 1999: We Offer Praises
- 2001: Dwell in the House
- 2003: Solo Para Ti
- 2005: Lift Him Up Collection: The Best of Ron Kenoly
- 2005: Fill The Earth
- 2009: Egypt Praises
- 2010: Christmas with Ron Kenoly
- 2013: Set Apart Is Your Name Yahuwah Vol.1
- 2015: Set Apart Is Your Name Yahuwah Vol.2

=== Songs ===
Songs written or co-written by Kenoly:

- Jesus Is Alive (1991)
  - "Jesus Is Alive"
  - "Keeper of My Heart" with Kelly Husted
- Lift Him Up with Ron Kenoly (1992)
  - "Hallowed Be Your Name" with Louis Smith
  - "We're Going Up to the High Places"
- God Is Able (1994)
  - "Our God Is Able (Rap)"
  - "Use Me" with Dewitt Jones
  - "Jesus Is Alive"
- Sing Out with One Voice (1995)
  - "Joyfully, Joyfully"
  - "Give to the Lord"
  - "Welcome Rap"
  - "We Dedicate This Time"
- Welcome Home (1996)
  - "Go Ahead"
  - "Heal Their Land"
  - "I Testify Today" with Louis Smith
  - "Welcome Home"
  - "I Love To Love You Lord" with Louis Smith
  - "Lord I Magnify" with Tavita Kenoly (wife)
- Majesty (1998)
  - "Hallelujah to the King of Kings" with Renetha Muldrew
  - "The King of Kings Is Coming" with Bob Ayala
  - "Return To Righteousness America" with Don Moen and Tom Brooks
  - "In Righteousness You Reign"
  - "Hallelujah Reprise/Hallelujah Chorus (Hallelujah to the King of Kings)" with music by George Frideric Handel and featuring Renetha Muldrew
- We Offer Praises (1999)
  - "We Offer Praises"
  - "It Is Good"
  - "Joshua Generation"
  - "Plane Crash Testimony" (spoken word)
  - "Broken Leg Testimony" (spoken word)
  - "I Still Have Joy"
- Dwell in the House (2001)
  - "Praise Him"
  - "All The Way"

== Filmography ==
- 2010 - The Bill Collector
