= Rain Down (album) =

Rain Down!

Live album by Alvin Slaughter
- Released: 2000
- Recorded: Trinidad, New York City, Tennessee, 1999
- Genre: Contemporary worship music
- Length: 70:10
- Label: Integrity/Hosanna! Music/Epic/Sparrow Records
- Producers: Paul Mills, Alvin Slaughter, Chris Thomason (Executive), Don Moen (Executive)

Alvin Slaughter chronology
Yes (Alvin Slaughter album) (1997)	Rain Down! (2000)	On The Inside (2004)

Rain Down is the fifth contemporary worship music album originally released in the U.S. with worship leader Alvin Slaughter by Integrity/Hosanna! Music. The album was released in the year 2000. It was recorded live during worship experiences in Tennessee, New York and Trinidad. Rain Down features worshipers from varying denominations.

Product ID Number
Title	CD	Tape
Rain Down!	16742CD	16742

== Track listing ==
1. Shout
2. Speak Lord
3. I'm Talking 'Bout Jesus
4. Bless This Time
5. Who Can Satisfy
6. I Believe The Promise
7. I Will Run To You
8. Holy Spirit Rain Down
9. We've Come To Worship The Lord
10. He Alone Is Worthy
11. You Are The One
12. Suddenly

== Credits ==
Producers:

- Paul Mills
- Alvin Slaughter

Executive Producer:

- Don Moen
- Chris Thomason

Arrangers:

- Paul Mills - Track, Vocal, String Arrangement
- Alin Slaughter - Track, Vocal Arrangement
- Michael Mellett - Vocal Arrangement
- Craig Young
- Chris Rodriguez - Vocal Arrangement
- Roger Ryan
- Dave Horton - Vocal Arrangement

A&R Director:

- Chris Thomason

Worship Leader:

- Alvin Slaughter

Liner Notes:

- Michael Coleman
- Alvin Slaughter

Musicians:

- Steve Brewster - Drums and Percussion
- Chris Rodriguez - Guitar
- Blair Masters - Keyboards
- Jerry McPherson - Guitar
- Jackie Street - Bass
- Roger Ryan - Keyboards
- The Nashville String Machine - Strings
- Carl Gorodetzky - Conductor

Vocals (Background):

- Chris Rodriguez
- Michael Mellett
- Lisa Bevill
- Wendy Moten

Choir:

- "The Lee College Campus Choir"
- Dave Horton - Director
- Bobby Soverall - Director

Engineers:

- Paul Mills - Mixing engineer
- Jeff Pitzer - Engineer
