= Josué Pineda =

- Born: 1985 (age 39–40); Chalchuapa, El Salvador
- Occupations: Musical artist; Record producer; Songwriter; Music consultant

Josué Pineda (born 1985) is a Salvadoran musical artist, record producer, songwriter and music consultant best known for his work with Marcos Vidal, Tom Brooks and Héctor Hermosillo. Pineda won the Latin Grammy Award for Best Christian Album at the 17th Annual Latin Grammy Awards.

== Early life and career ==
Pineda was born in Chalchuapa, in the department of Santa Ana, El Salvador. At age 13, he started working as an assistant at a recording studio. His interest in music led to empirically record and produce local bands. At the age of 15, he stopped working at the studio and enrolled at the University of El Salvador.

At 21, he moved to Los Angeles to pursue a career in music. He started playing guitar and bass at local churches. In 2008, he started working at the Crystal Cathedral as musical artist and music director, where he met Héctor Hermosillo. In 2012, he enrolled at Hope University to study music production and started producing albums alongside Tom Brooks, including Marcos Vidal's 2016 album "25 Años".

In 2023, he founded PJMedia Group, an agency specializing in music consultancy, artist development and music marketing.

== Accolades ==
Pineda won the Latin Grammy Award for Best Christian Album (Spanish Language) for his work as a producer alongside Tom Brooks on "25 años" by Spanish artist Marcos Vidal at the 17th Annual Latin Grammy Awards.
