= Yes (Alvin Slaughter album) =

Yes!

Live album by Alvin Slaughter
- Released: 1997
- Recorded: New Song Christian Fellowship, Brentwood, Tennessee
- Genre: Contemporary worship music
- Length: 70:10
- Label: Integrity/Hosanna! Music/Epic/Sparrow Records
- Producer: Dave Williamson, Scott Williamson, Chris Long (Executive)

Alvin Slaughter chronology
God Can (1996)	Yes! (1997)	Rain Down (Slaughter) (2000)

Yes is the third contemporary worship music album originally released in the U.S. with worship leader Alvin Slaughter by Integrity/Hosanna! Music. The album was recorded live at New Song Christian Fellowship in Brentwood, Tennessee pastored by Dale Evrist, and released in 1997. The former Brooklyn Tabernacle lead vocalist draws on his gospel roots for twelve new arrangements of choral material including "Mercy Refused," "Worthy Worthy," "Jesus Is Mine", and nine other tracks.

Product ID Number
Title	CD	Tape
Yes!	11182CD	11182

== Track listing ==
1. Jesus You Are Welcome - 4:32
2. God Is Good - 4:44
3. Move in This Place - 4:04
4. Mercy Refused - 4:25
5. Allelujah, Praise Jehova - 4:42
6. A Servant's Prayer - 3:26
7. I Need Thee Every Hour - 3:02
8. He's Already Provided - 3:52
9. Worthy Worthy - 3:52
10. Medley: Yes, Lord, Yes//Yes - 5:20
11. Midnight Cry - 7:09
12. Jesus Is Mine - 4:28

== Credits ==
Producers:

- Dave Williamson
- Scott Williamson

Executive Producer:

- Chris Long

Arrangers:

- Chris McDonald
- Dave Williamson
- Scott Williamson

A&R Director::

- Chris Thomason

Worship Leader:

- Alvin Slaughter

Liner Notes:

- Michael Coleman
- Alvin Slaughter

Musicians:

- Scott Williamson - Drums
- Mark Baldwin - Guitar
- Jeff Bailey - Trumpet
- Pat Coil - Keyboards, Synthesizer
- Mark Douthit - Saxophone
- Eric Darken - Percussion
- Chris McDonald - Trombone
- Jim Hammerly - Acoustic and Electric Piano
- Mike Haynes - Trumpet
- Jackie Street - Bass
- Steven Ford - Synthesizer, Keyboards, Organ (Hammond)

Vocals (Background):

- Tim Davis
- Sherry Carter - Soloist
- Marcia Ware - Soloist

Choir:

- "New Song Christian Fellowship Choir"
- Dave Williamson - Director

Special Guest Appearance:

- "The New Song Kids Choir"
- Frank Hernandez - Director
- Leslie Tayman - Director

Engineers:

- Paul Mills - Mixing
- Scott Williamson - Overdub Engineer
- Hank Williams - Mastering
- Randy Poole - Overdub Engineer
- David Schober - Remote Engineer
- Howard Steele - Remote Recording Engineer
- Sandra Johnson - Production Assistant
