= Falling (LeBlanc and Carr song) =

Single by LeBlanc & Carr

from the album Midnight Light
- B-side: "I Believe That We"
- Released: October 1977
- Genre: Soft rock
- Label: Big Tree
- Songwriters: Lenny LeBlanc, Eddie Struzick
- Producer: Pete Carr

LeBlanc & Carr singles chronology
"Hound Dog Man (Play It Again)" (1977)	"Falling" (1977)	"Midnight Light" (1978)

"Falling" is a 1977 song by Lenny LeBlanc and Pete Carr. It was their highest-charting single, peaking at number 13 in the United States during the winter of 1978. It was the first of two charting singles from their Midnight Light LP.

"Falling" spent 28 weeks on the American charts. On Cash Box, the song reached number 11. "Falling" also hit number 11 on the Adult Contemporary chart as well as Canadian Pop Singles.

A song originally recorded by LeBlanc in 1976, "Sharing the Night Together", became a bigger hit than "Falling" when covered and released by Dr. Hook in the fall of 1978. (U.S. number 6, Canada number 3).

== Chart history ==
=== Weekly charts ===
Chart (1977–1978)	Peak position
Canada RPM Top Singles	11
Canada RPM Adult Contemporary	25
US Billboard Hot 100	13
US Billboard Adult Contemporary	11
US Cash Box Top 100	11

=== Year-end charts ===
Chart (1978)	Rank
Canada RPM Top Singles	90
US Billboard Hot 100	79
US Cash Box	83
