= I Will Sing =

Live album by Don Moen
- Released: 2000
- Recorded: CBN, Virginia Beach, Virginia
- Genre: Contemporary worship music
- Length: 71:10
- Label: Integrity, Hosanna! Music, Epic, Sony
- Producer: Paul Mills

Don Moen chronology
Heal Our Land (2000)	I Will Sing (2000)	God in Us (2001)

Professional ratings
Review scores
Source	Rating
AllMusic	3/5 stars
Cross Rhythms Direct	9/10 stars

I Will Sing is an album of contemporary worship music recorded by Don Moen. Recorded live in the CBN studios in Virginia Beach, Virginia, the album was produced by Paul Mills, and includes the vocals by Lenny LeBlanc and guitar by Chris Rodriguez. The album also includes narrations that contain Bible verses. The video and the DVD are the same recording of this album.

Product ID Number
Title	CD	Tape	Video	DVD	VCD
I Will Sing	17822	17824	17823	20121	17821

== Conception ==
Moen's preceding albums have been recorded in front of large audiences, particularly God Is Good – Worship with Don Moen, which was recorded with an audience of 7000 worshippers. However, for I Will Sing, Moen decided to record an album with only a small number of worshippers. Speaking on this, he said,

You hear a lot about mega-churches, but most people worship in small churches. My heart goes out to music directors who hear our CDs and think, "That sounds great, but we've got 85 people in our church."

Moen thus decided to record an album to encourage other worship leaders to lead worship in front of small audiences.I Will Sing was recorded with only 70 local worshippers.

Moen described the experience as being the "second most powerful worship experience [he had] ever had".

== Song inspiration ==
The title track of the album, I Will Sing, was written by Moen. It was written while Moen was in his car at one of Alabama's gulf coast beaches, trying to write songs for his upcoming album. He had been having a frustrating day, and the lyrics he wrote demonstrated his feelings. However, he did not like the lyrics. He said,

I didn't feel anything the entire day. It was one of those times when you wonder where God is. I was driving back home, feeling frustrated, and I said, "Lord, You seem so far away, a million miles or more it feels today." It just popped out. Then I got another line: "And though I haven't lost my faith, I must confess right now that it's hard for me to pray." The words kept coming, and I wrote the entire song right there in my car, but I didn't like it. I thought, "What a waste! I need songs for the album; I don't need this!"

Moen did not plan to use the song, thinking that he would "never put it on a Hosanna! Music album".

Later, he found out about the death of David C. Reilly's daughter. Reilly had been designing album covers for Integrity Music for more than a decade. Moen then recorded the song on a CD and sent it to David, with an encouragement. The note he attached to Reilly said,

I know you're going to have days when you feel like, "Where in the world is God?" but I want to encourage you to sing. Don't give up.

It was then that Moen discovered the value of the song, realizing that God wanted his people to be "honest before the Lord".

== Track listing ==
1. "Our Father Overture" (Paul Mills) – 1:23
2. "Our Father" (Don Moen) – 5:52
3. "Lift Up Your Heads" (Tommy Walker) – 4:34
4. "Sing For Joy" (Lamont Hiebert) – 4:06
5. "River of Love" (Moen, Claire Cloninger) – 4:34
6. "Two Hands, One Heart" (Moen, Cloninger) – 4:07
7. "Glory To The Lord" (Lynn Deshazo) – 4:39
8. "As We Worship You" (Walker) – 7:34
9. "Here We Are" (Moen, Cloninger) – 4:37
10. "Have Your Way" (Moen, Cloninger) – 2:14
11. "Like Eagles" (Kevin Dukes, Marcia Skidmore) – 5:29
12. "We Wait" (Wes Tuttle) – 5:18
13. "I Will Sing" (Moen) – 6:02
14. "Narration"(Don Sharing) – 0:42
15. "Lord You Are Good" (Steve Merkel) – 4:49
16. "Lord We've Come To Worship" (Moen, Tommy Coomes) – 5:10
- IN TOTAL – 71:10

== Credits ==
=== Production ===
- Don Moen – executive producer
- Chris Thomason – executive producer
- Chris Springer – A&R direction
- Paul Mills – producer, mixing
- Randy Adams – engineer
- Andrew Baird – second engineer
- Mark Kidd – second engineer
- Garrett Rockey – second engineer
- Ginger Hyatt – design
- Ric Moore – photography
- Michael Coleman – liner notes

=== Personnel ===
Arrangers

- Lenny LeBlanc, Michael Mellett, Don Moen and Rachel Wilson – BGV arrangements
- Paul Mills – string arrangements and conductor
- Paul Mills, Don Moen and the band – track arrangements

Musicians and Vocals

- Don Moen – lead vocals, acoustic piano, worship leader
- Alberto Rivera – keyboards
- Blair Masters – additional keyboards, Hammond B3 organ
- Paul Mills – additional keyboards
- Lenny LeBlanc – acoustic guitars, vocals
- Chris Rodriguez – acoustic guitars, electric guitars
- Jerry McPherson – additional acoustic guitars, additional electric guitars
- Mark Childers – bass
- Steve Brewster – drums
- Ken Lewis – percussion
- Carl Gorodetzky – string contractor
- Nashville String Machine – strings
- Michael Mellett – vocals
- Rachel Wilson – vocals
- Kingdom Choir of Tide Water – choir
- Kathi Lee Wilson – choir director
