= Thank You Lord =

Live album by Don Moen
- Released: April 6, 2004
- Recorded: October 3, 2003
- Venue: Christian Broadcasting Network's Regent University Theater (Virginia Beach, Virginia): Westpark Sound (Franklin, Tennessee)
- Genre: Worship music
- Length: 74:35
- Label: Hosanna! Music, Integrity Music
- Producer: David Hamilton

Don Moen chronology
| Trono de Gracia con Don Moen (2003) | Thank You Lord (2004) | Arise: The Worship Legacy of Don Moen (2006) |

Professional ratings
Review scores
| Source | Rating |
|---|---|
| Cross Rhythms Direct | (8/10) |

Thank You Lord is a contemporary worship music album recorded by Don Moen. The album was released on April 6, 2004, by Integrity Music, Hosanna! Music, Christian Broadcasting Network, Epic Records, and Sony Music Entertainment. On March 5, 2005, was recognized by Billboard Magazine, charting No. 15 on the Top Christian Albums and No. 22 on the Heatseekers.

== Recording ==
Thank You Lord was recorded on October 3, 2003, during a live worship service at Regent University, located in Virginia Beach, Virginia. The school was founded by the American televangelist Pat Robertson, president and founder of the Christian Broadcasting Network. The recording featured worship leader, Don Moen, along with the Kingdom Choir of Tide Water and the Brentwood Baptist Church Worship Choir. This would be the final full-length live recording Moen would do for Integrity Music and the last full-length live recording he would do as an artist until 2016's "God Will Make a Way: A Worship Musical."

== Track listing ==
1. "This Is Your House" – 4:35
2. "Arise" – 6:01
3. "Thank You Lord" – 5:59
4. "Creator King" – 4:59
5. "Throne of Praise" – 6:37
6. "Rescue" – 5:58
7. "I Need Thee Every Hour" – 2:19
8. "At The Foot of the Cross (Ashes To Beauty)" – 5:14
9. "Mi Corazon" – 5:02
10. "Worthy of Praises" – 5:14
11. "Jesus You Are My Healer" – 7:00
12. "All To You" / "I Surrender All" – 5:46
13. "Wonderful Magnificent God" – 5:33
14. "When It's All Been Said and Done" – 3:30

== Credits ==
=== Production ===
- Don Moen – executive producer
- Gordon P. Robertson – executive producer for CBN
- Chris Thomason – executive producer, A&R
- David Hamilton – producer, all arrangements, overdub recording
- Chuck Harris – track recording, vocal recording, Pro Tools editing
- Tom Reeves – additional recording
- Doug Sarrett – additional recording
- Scott Griffith – recording assistant
- Scott Sanchez – recording assistant
- Jim Cooley – Pro Tools editing
- Matt Damico – Pro Tools editing
- Ronnie Brookshire – mixing at The Groove Room (Nashville, Tennessee)
- Hank Williams – mastering at MasterMix (Nashville, Tennessee)
- Juan Portela – production assistant
- Adrienne Gray – remote production manager
- Helen Miller – assistant production manager
- Jay Smith – design
- Russ Harrington – photography
- Nick Beecher – make-up

=== Personnel ===
Musicians and Vocals

- Don Moen – lead vocals, acoustic piano, worship leader
- David Hamilton – keyboards
- Blair Masters – keyboards, Hammond B3 organ
- Juan Portela – programming
- Mark Baldwin – acoustic guitars, electric guitars, nylon-string guitar
- Tom Hemby – acoustic guitars, electric guitars, mandolin
- Matt Pierson – bass
- Raymond Boyd – drums
- Skip Cleavinger – whistle, Uilleann pipes
- Leanne Albrecht – vocals, featured vocals (7)
- Travis Cottrell – vocals, featured vocals (6)
- Mandisa Hundley – vocals
- Rachel Robinson – vocals, featured vocals (4)
- Drew Cline – additional vocals
- Maribeth Johnson – additional vocals
- Kingdom Choir of Tide Water – choir
- Kathi Lee Wilson – choir director
- Brentwood Baptist Church Worship Choir – additional choir

== Charts ==
| Chart (2004) | Peak position |
|---|---|
| Singaporean Albums (RIAS) | 10 |
