= Alvin Slaughter =

American singer (born 1955)

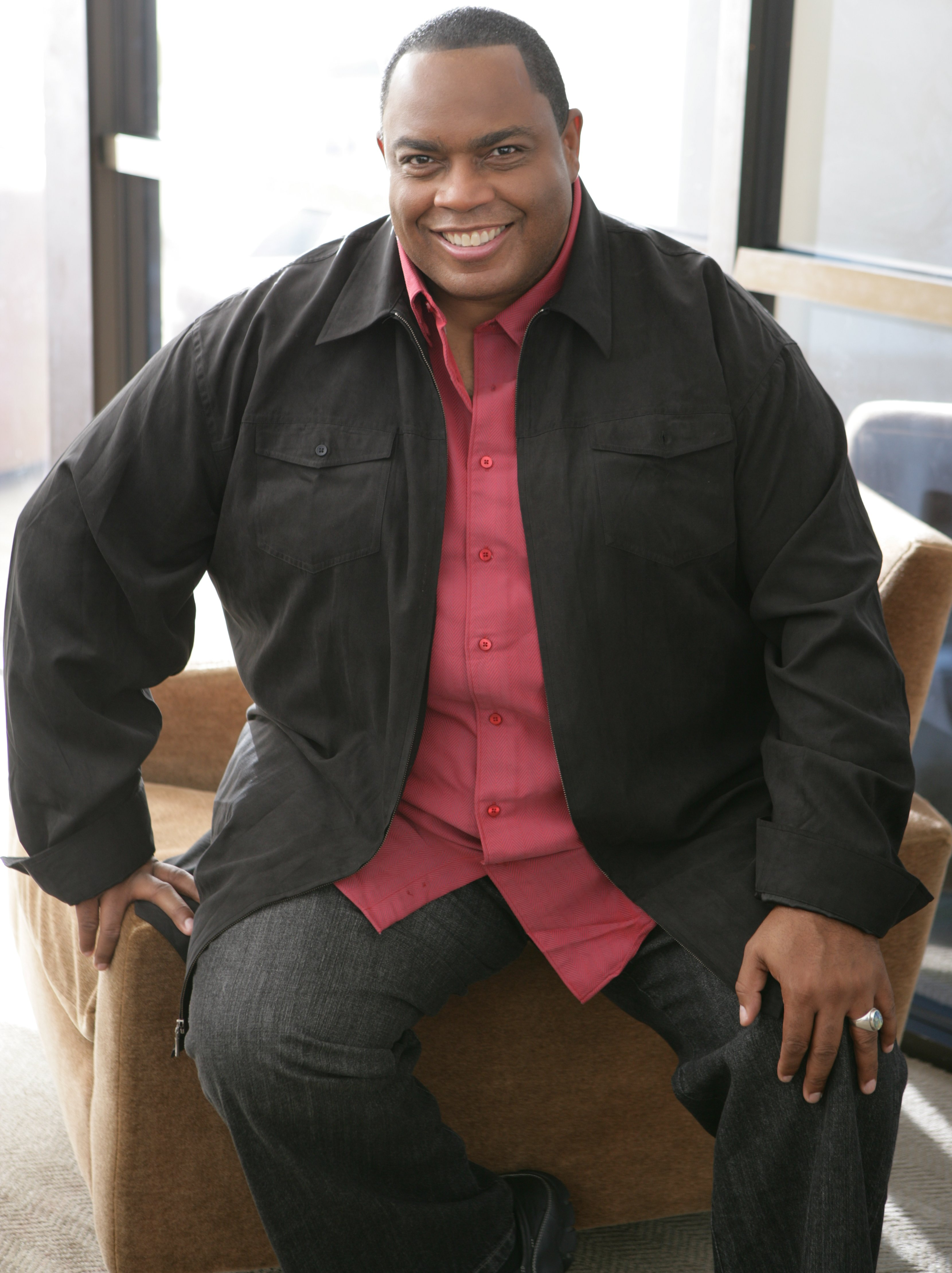
- Slaughter in September 2020

Background information
- Born: July 17, 1955 (age 71); New York City, United States
- Genre: Christian
- Occupations: Musician, worship leader, singer-songwriter
- Years active: 1990–present
- Label: Integrity Music
- Formerly of: Brooklyn Tabernacle Choir
- Website: alvinslaughter.com

Alvin Martin Slaughter (born July 17, 1955) is an American gospel musician, worship leader, and singer-songwriter.

== Career ==
Slaughter is based out of New York City, where he was a member of the Brooklyn Tabernacle Choir until the early 1990s, when he was signed by Integrity Music and began his solo career. He has been nominated for several Dove Awards and performed on the TBN television network.

The Faith Life is the fifth contemporary worship music album originally released in the U.S. Slaughter by Integrity/Hosanna! Music. The album was recorded live at Covenant Love Family Church in Fayetteville, North Carolina, and released in 2005. This fifteen-song release includes "Sacrifice of Praise," "Launch Out," "My Joy," and more.

Slaughter is no longer signed to Integrity Music and hasn't released any official music since 2008. Alvin continues to travel and perform Christian concerts with his wife, sharing from her experiences as a former missionary to Haiti.

== Personal life ==
He is married to his second wife Joy Slaughter, where they together reside in New York.

== Discography ==
- Revive Us Again (Hosanna! Music, 1994) U.S. Contemporary Christian No. 34
- Champion Of Love (Integrity Music, 1994)
- God Can (Hosanna Music, 1996) U.S. Contemporary Christian No. 22
- Yes! (Integrity Music, 1997) U.S. Contemporary Christian No. 38
- Rain Down (Hosanna Music, 2000) U.S. Contemporary Christian No. 27
- On the Inside (Epic Records, 2003) U.S. Gospel No. 23
- The Faith Life (Epic, 2005) U.S. Gospel No. 41
- Overcomer (Columbia Records, 2008)
