= Give Thanks =

Live album by Don Moen
- Released: July 1986
- Recorded: May 1986
- Venue: Gulf Coast Covenant Church, Mobile, Alabama
- Genre: Contemporary worship music
- Length: 38:31
- Label: Integrity Music, Hosanna! Music
- Producer: Tom Brooks

Don Moen chronology
Give Thanks (1986)	Steadfast Love (1988)

Give Thanks is a live worship album recorded by American singer and songwriter, Don Moen. It was produced by Tom Brooks for Hosanna! Music, and became the label's bestselling release, with more than one million copies sold worldwide. It was certified gold in February 1995 by the Recording Industry Association of America (RIAA), in recognition of selling over 500,000 units.

== Recording ==
Give Thanks was recorded during a live worship service at Covenant Church of Mobile, Alabama in May 1986. The recording featured worship leader, Don Moen, along with choir vocalists and members of the congregation. The focus of the musical release emphasizes God as Jehovah-Rapha (Hebrew: râpâ'), which is translated from the Old Testament as "the Lord, our Healer". The live recording was followed by an extended time of worship, which included several reports of physical healings.

== Release ==
The album was released on July 1986, by Integrity's Hosanna! Music. Hosanna! made a second release under their label seven years later, on September 1, 1993. The recording was released on CD, tape, and digital download, the latter of which was offered by Epic Records and Sony Music Entertainment in 2004.

== Title song ==
The album includes the song "Give Thanks with a Grateful Heart", which was written by Henry Smith in 1978. Following the introduction of the song during a worship service at the Williamsburg New Testament Church in Virginia, a military couple reintroduced it to a congregation in Germany. The song eventually caught the attention of executives at Integrity Music. When Integrity's Hosanna! Music copyrighted the song in 1986, the author was unknown. After the Give Thanks album was released, the song was brought to the attention of Smith, who contacted Integrity with authorship information. Integrity later included songwriting credits on all subsequent releases, along with a writer-publisher agreement. As of 2010, the song has been recorded by over 50 companies and published in songbooks around the world.

"Give Thanks" is one of Don Moen's more recognizable songs, having been translated into various other languages, including Russian, Afrikaans, and Swedish. Arrangements are available for orchestration, vocals, choirs, rhythm, and piano. As of August 2011, the song is one of the Top 100 CCLI Songs reported by SongSelect, which provides online access of worship song lyrics, sound samples and download of lead sheets, chord sheets, and SATB hymn sheets. The song also been included in 11 known hymn books.

== Track listing ==
1. "Give Thanks" (Henry Smith) – 3:34
2. "Let the Redeemed" (Ward Ellis) – 1:04
3. "Ah, Lord God" (Kay Chance) – 1:41
4. "What a Mighty God We Serve" (Traditional) – 1:41
5. "I Will Celebrate" (Linda Duvall) – 1:56
6. "Jehovah-Jireh" (Merla Watson) – 2:31
7. "I Am the God That Healeth Thee" (Don Moen) – 4:07
8. "I Will Bless the Lord" (Frank Hernandez) – 2:34
9. "My Soul Follows Hard After Thee" (Jeffrey Smith) – 1:50
10. "Lord, I'm Gonna Love You" (Keith Green) – 2:05
11. "Like a Shepherd" (Moen, Deborah Simpson) – 4:21
12. "Blessed be the Name of the Lord" (Moen) – 1:49
13. "Worthy, You Are Worthy" (Moen) – 3:34
14. "You Are My God" (Macon Delavan) – 3:54
15. "Give Thanks" (reprise) (Henry Smith) – 1:43

Total duration – 38:32

== Credits ==
Musicians and Vocals

- Don Moen – lead vocals, acoustic piano, worship leader
- Tom Brooks – keyboards
- John Hayes – guitars
- Jay Hungerford – bass
- Carl Albrecht – drums, percussion
- Jon Clarke – woodwinds
- Dave Beatty – lead trombone
- Chris Jaudes – lead trumpet
- The New Earth Orchestra – brass, strings
- Leanne Albrecht – backing vocals
- Debbie Amundson – backing vocals
- Jeff Hamlin – backing vocals
- Kent Henry – backing vocals
- Charlie LeBlanc – backing vocals
- Jill LeBlanc – backing vocals
- Jamie Owens-Collins – backing vocals
- Kelly Willard – backing vocals

Production

- Michael Coleman – executive producer
- Ed Lindquist – executive producer
- Tom Brooks – producer, arrangements, engineer
- Curt Taipale – engineer
