= Lenny LeBlanc =

American musician and songwriter (born 1951)

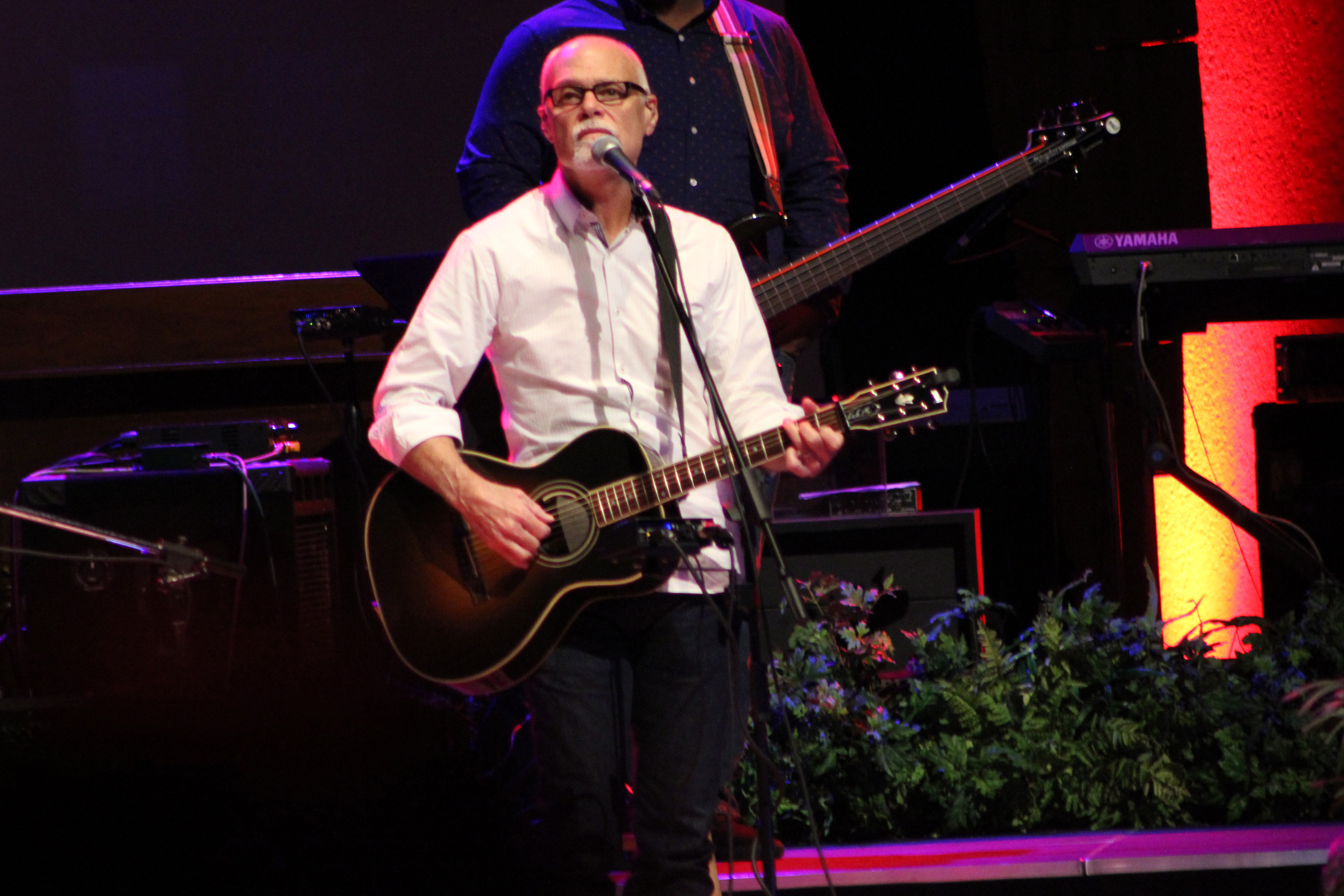

Background information
- Born: June 17, 1951 (age 74)
- Origin: Leominster, Massachusetts, U.S.
- Genres: Soft rock, CCM, contemporary worship
- Occupations: Singer, songwriter
- Years active: 1975–present
- Labels: Big Tree, Heartland, Integrity!
- Website: www.lennyleblanc.com

Lenny LeBlanc (born June 17, 1951) is an American musician and songwriter. He started his career with Pete Carr in 1975 and later separated ways when both had different plans for their profession. A resident of Alabama, he is known for the song "Falling" and has sung with many artists. Since 1987, LeBlanc works at his own studio in Muscle Shoals, Alabama.

== Early life ==
He was born in Leominster, Massachusetts, United States. He was raised Catholic. In 1955, his family moved south to Daytona Beach, Florida. LeBlanc spent his summers on the beach surfing until he met some teens who played guitars. He later landed a job washing dishes to pay for his first bass guitar. During the next three years of school, LeBlanc played at dances and local clubs around Daytona, developing his vocal talents as well. He graduated from high school in 1969 and moved to Cincinnati, Ohio in 1970. He has resided in Florence, Alabama since 1973.

== Musical career ==
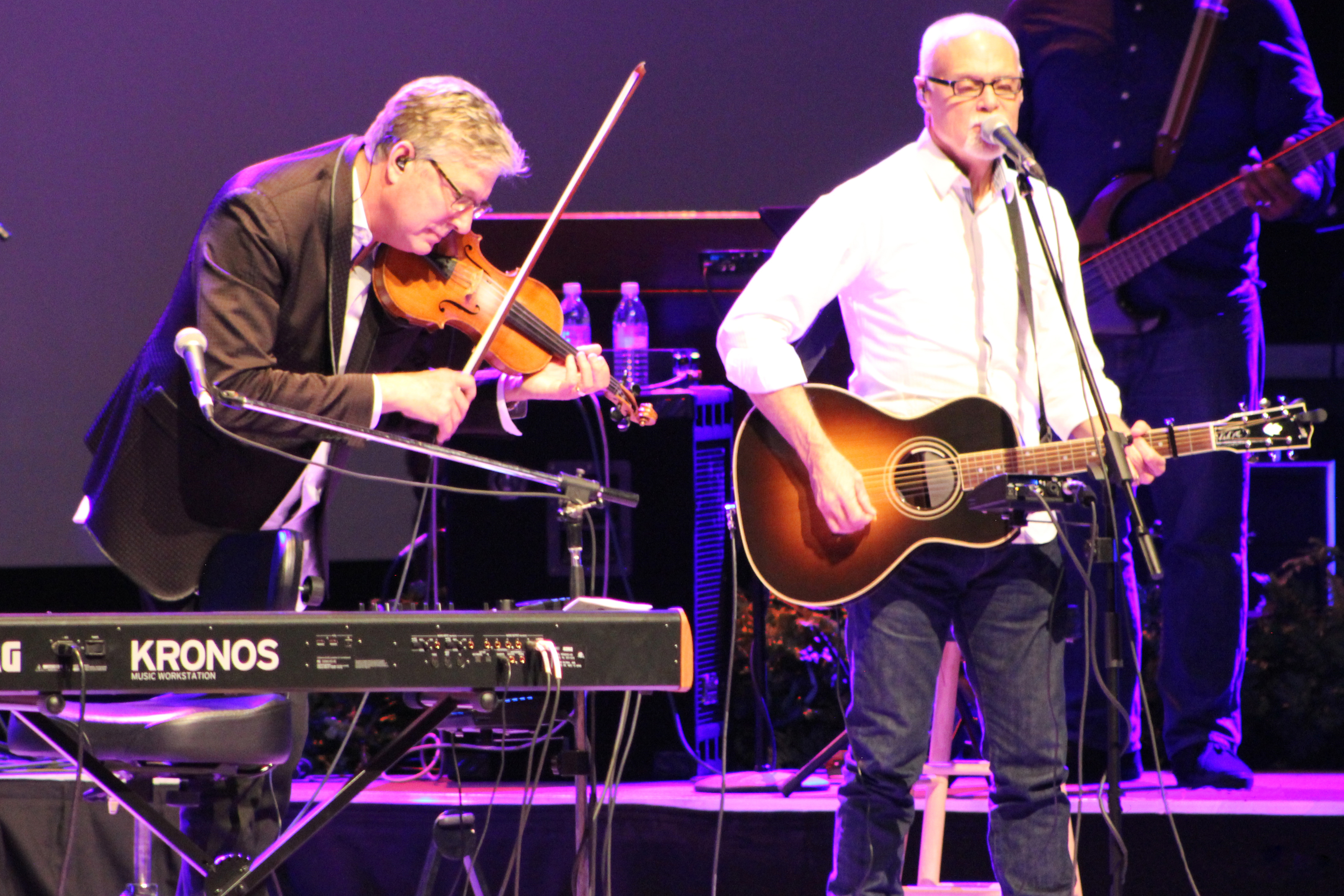
LeBlanc performing together with Don Moen

Former band member and good friend Pete Carr had become a successful producer and studio guitarist in Muscle Shoals, Alabama. He encouraged LeBlanc to join him there. After a few months LeBlanc began playing bass as well as singing background vocals with artists such as Hank Williams Jr., Crystal Gayle, Etta James, Shenandoah, Ricky Skaggs, Sawyer Brown, The Supremes, Joan Baez, Amy Grant and Roy Orbison.

With much success as a background musician and singer, LeBlanc embarked on a solo career. In 1975, he recorded a demo and producer Carr sent a copy to Jerry Wexler at Atlantic Records. A few months later LeBlanc's first solo LP was released. Atlantic saw great potential in LeBlanc and teamed him with Carr, with the two of them recording a subsequent album credited to LeBlanc and Carr. The result was three chart singles, including the top 40 hit "Falling". The song had received significant airplay, although there is no currently reported sales figures for the single. LeBlanc and Carr began touring with major acts. After a while, Carr decided he enjoyed making the records more than promoting them, so before they could record a follow-up album, the duo went their separate ways. LeBlanc continued writing songs and pursuing a solo effort, this time with Capitol Records.

On the American Top 40 show of February 25, 1978, Casey Kasem reported that LeBlanc and Carr had been bumped from the ill-fated flight which killed some of the members of rock band Lynyrd Skynyrd. The acts were touring together, and last-minute travel plan changes prevented the duo from boarding the plane after they had initially been offered seats.

In 1980, LeBlanc became a born-again Christian and began recording Christian-themed music. In 1983, Heartland Records released Say a Prayer followed by Person to Person in 1984. In 1987, LeBlanc opened his own recording studio in Muscle Shoals, Alabama, where he does his own productions as well as others.

== Awards ==
- "Falling" - Named BMI Millionaire song (one million or more radio plays)
- "Falling" - Named one of Billboard's all-time favorite Top 40 Hits
- Dove Award- Inspirational Recorded Song of the Year -"Above All" - Worship album Michael W. Smith, Lenny LeBlanc, Paul Baloche (2003)
- In 2010 LeBlanc worked with Asian artists Brian Joo, Van Ness Wu, Choi Siwon, and John Lee on the 3RD Wave Music project.

== Discography ==
- 1976 – Hound Dog Man – Big Tree
- 1977 – Lenny LeBlanc – Atlantic/Big Tree
- 1978 – Midnight Light (as LeBlanc & Carr) – Atlantic/Big Tree
- 1981 – Breakthrough – Heartland/Capitol
- 1983 – Say a Prayer – Heartland/CBS-Priority
- 1984 – Person to Person – Heartland/Benson
- 1990 – Faithful Heart – Maranatha!/Benson
- 1991 – Prisoner of Love – Maranatha!/Benson
- 1991 – Pure Heart – Hosanna! Music/Integrity
- 1994 – All My Dreams – Integrity Music
- 1996 – The Bridge – Integrity Music
- 1999 – Above All – Integrity Music
- 2002 – One Desire – Integrity Music
- 2006 – Arise: A Celebration of Worship – Integrity Music
- 2007 – All For Love – Integrity Music
- 2007 – Songs From My Living Room (DVD) – LenSongs Pictures
- 2008 – Christmas Night – Indelible Creative Group
- 2010 – Love Like No Other – In:ciite
- 2012 – Anthology — The Best of Lenny LeBlanc – In:ciite

== See also ==
- Muscle Shoals Rhythm Section
