= Don Moen =

American singer and musician (born 1950)

- Moen in 2009

Background information
- Born: Donald James Moen; June 29, 1950 (age 76)
- Genres: Contemporary worship music; CCM
- Occupation: Musician
- Instruments: Vocals; piano; keyboards; violin
- Years active: 1984–present
- Labels: Integrity Music; Hosanna! Music; Integrity Asia; Sparrow; Star Song; Word; Epic; Columbia; Sony; Don Moen Records; in:ciite; EMI Christian Music Group; Brentwood Benson
- Website: donmoen.com

Donald James Moen (born June 29, 1950) is an American singer, pianist, and songwriter, specializing in Christian worship music.

== Early life and education ==
Moen grew up in Two Harbors, Minnesota, where he attended high school, graduating in 1968. Moen attended Oral Roberts University, a Christian liberal arts college.

== Career ==
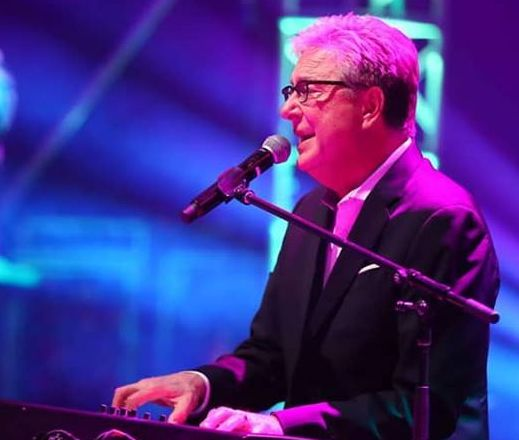
Moen in 2018

He became a Living Sound musician for Terry Law Ministries and traveled with Terry Law for ten years. After, he worked for Integrity Media for over 20 years, serving as creative director and president of Integrity Music, president of Integrity Label Group, and an executive producer of Integrity Music albums. He left Integrity Media in December 2007 to start a new initiative, The Don Moen Company. The Don Moen Company acquired MediaComplete, the church software company that created MediaShout. Moen became a radio host for Don Moen & Friends in 2009. Moen received a Dove Award for his work on the musical God with Us in addition to nine nominations for his songs.

Moen also worked with Claire Cloninger, Paul Overstreet, Martin J. Nystrom, Randy Rothwell, Ron Kenoly, Bob Fitts, Debbye Graafsma, Paul Baloche, Tom Brooks, Aline Barros, among many others. He worked with musicians, Justo Almario, Carl Albrecht, Abraham Laboriel, Alex Acuña, Paul Jackson, Jr., Lenny LeBlanc and Chris Graham. He was a catalyst in launching the careers of Paul Baloche, Darlene Zschech, Israel Houghton, and Hillsong United.

He produced 11 volumes for the Hosanna! Music series of worship albums. His first album under his own name, Worship with Don Moen, was released in 1992. His music has total global sales of over five million units.

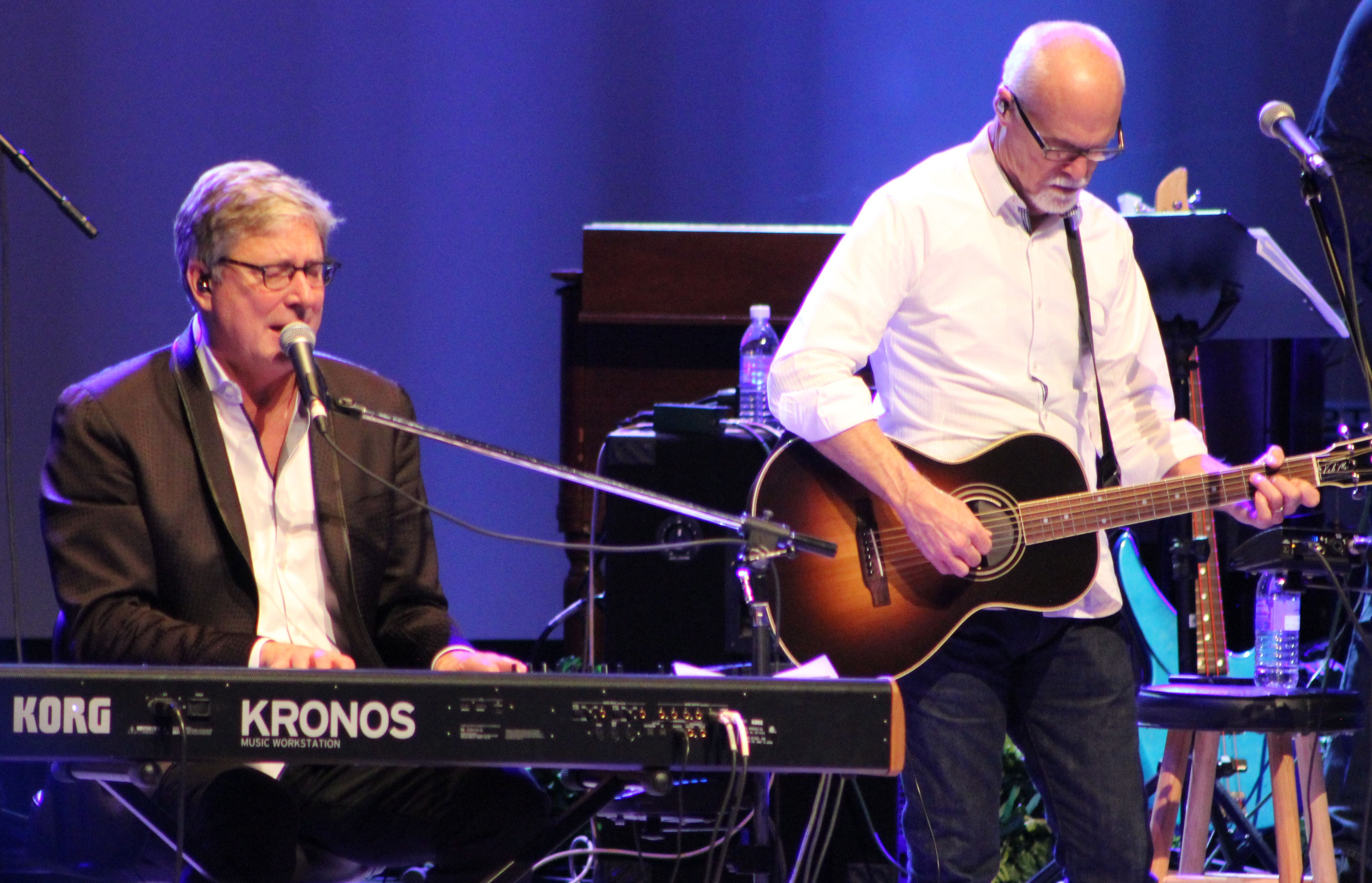
Moen performing with Lenny LeBlanc

Moen's first album for Hosanna! Music, Give Thanks, became the label's bestseller. Produced by Tom Brooks, Give Thanks went on to be certified Gold by the RIAA. Moen followed this with a number of albums of his own including two, En Tu Presencia and Trono De Gracia, in Spanish. God with Us won the Dove Award for Best Musical. On an Asian tour in 1999 he recorded The Mercy Seat at Singapore Indoor Stadium and Heal Our Land at Yoido Park in South Korea, which was released in 2000. One of Moen's albums, I Will Sing, was recorded at Christian Broadcasting Network.

God Will Make a Way: The Best of Don Moen was released in 2003 and features 19 greatest hits. The title song was written for his sister-in-law and her husband, whose oldest son died in an auto accident while their other three children survived but were seriously injured. Moen's Hiding Place became his first studio album which was recorded at Paragon Studios in Franklin, Tennessee, and was released in the autumn of 2006. I Believe There Is More released in late 2008. His third studio recording titled Uncharted Territory (funded successfully through Kickstarter) released on March 27, 2012. His Christmas album, Christmas: A Season of Hope, was released on October 22, 2012, and some songs were recorded at a studio in Czech Republic. Moen released Hymnbook as a celebration of reaching over 1 million likes on his Facebook page.

== Personal life ==
Moen and his wife, Laura, have been married since May 19, 1973. Together, they have five children.

== Discography ==
Give Thanks

- Released: 1986
- Format: CD, tape, download
- Label: Integrity Music, Hosanna! Music, Sparrow, Epic, Sony Music
- Producer: Tom Brooks, Michael Coleman (Executive), Ed Lindquist (Executive)
- Certification: Gold

Steadfast Love

- Released: 1988
- Format: CD (HM-016CD), tape (HM016), download
- Label: Integrity Music, Hosanna! Music, Sparrow, Columbia, Sony Music
- Producer: Tom Brooks, Michael Coleman (Executive), Ed Lindquist (Executive), Don Moen (Executive)

Bless the Lord

- Released: 1989
- Format: CD (HM-024CD), tape (HM-024), download
- Label: Integrity Music, Hosanna! Music, Sparrow-Star Song, Columbia, Sony Music
- Producer: Tom Brooks, Michael Coleman (Executive), Ed Lindquist (Executive)

Christmas

- Released: 1990
- Format: CD, tape, download
- Label: Integrity, Hosanna! Music, Sparrow-Star Song, Columbia, Sony Music
- Producer: Tom Brooks, Michael Coleman (Executive), Ed Lindquist (Executive)

Eternal God

- Released: 1990
- Format: CD, tape, download
- Label: Integrity, Hosanna! Music, Sparrow-Star Song, Columbia, Sony Music
- Producer: Tom Brooks, Michael Coleman (Executive), Ed Lindquist (Executive)

Worship with Don Moen

- Released: 1992
- Format: CD, tape, video, VCD, download
- Label: Integrity, Hosanna! Music, Word
- Producer: Tom Brooks, Michael Coleman (Executive), Ed Lindquist (Executive)

God with Us

- Released: 1993
- Format: CD, tape, video, VCD, download
- Label: Integrity, Hosanna! Music, Sparrow, Columbia, Sony Music
- Producer: Tom Fettke, Tom Hartley (Executive)
- Certification: Dove Award

Trust in the Lord – Live Worship with Don Moen

- Released: 1994
- Format: CD, tape, video, VCD, download
- Label: Integrity, Hosanna! Music, Columbia, Sony Music
- Producer: Mark Gasbarro, Don Moen (Producer and executive Producer), Michael Coleman (Executive)

Mighty Cross

- Released: 1994
- Format: CD, tape, download
- Label: Integrity, Hosanna! Music
- Producer: Tom Hartley, Michael Coleman (Executive), Don Moen (Executive)

Rivers of Joy

- Released: 1995
- Format: CD, tape, download
- Label: Integrity, Hosanna! Music, Columbia, Sony Music
- Producer: Don Harris, Michael Coleman (Executive), Don Moen (Executive)

Emmanuel Has Come

- Released: 1996
- Format: CD, tape, download
- Label: Integrity, Hosanna! Music, Columbia, Sony Music
- Producer: Steven V. Taylor, Chris Long (Executive), Michael Coleman (Senior Executive), Don Moen (Senior Executive)

Praise with Don Moen

- Released: 1996
- Format: CD, tape, download
- Label: Integrity, Hosanna! Music, Integrity Asia, Columbia, Sony Music
- Producer: Tom Brooks, Don Harris, Michael Coleman (Executive), Don Moen (Executive)

Let Your Glory Fall

- Released: 1997
- Format: CD, tape, download
- Label: Integrity, Hosanna! Music, Columbia, Sony Music
- Producer: Tom Brooks, Don Moen (Executive), Chris Long (Executive)

God for Us

- Released: 1998
- Format: CD, tape, download
- Label: Integrity Music, Hosanna! Music, Columbia, Sony Music
- Producer: Tom Fettke, Don Moen (Executive), Randy Vader (Executive)

God Is Good – Worship with Don Moen

- Released: 1998
- Format: CD, tape, video, DVD, VCD, download
- Label: Integrity, Hosanna! Music
- Producer: Tom Brooks, Don Moen (Executive), Chris Thomason (Executive)

En Tu Presencia

- Released: 1999
- Format: CD, tape, download
- Label: Integrity, Hosanna! Music, Columbia, Sony Music
- Producer: Isaac Hernandez, Tom Brooks, Don Harris, Don Moen (Executive), Chris Thomason (Executive), Dario Navac (Executive)

More of You, Lord – Praise with Don Moen Volume 2

- Released: 1999
- Format: CD, tape
- Label: Integrity, Hosanna! Music, Integrity Asia
- Producer: Tom Brooks, Russell Fragar, Don Harris, Chris Springer, Darlene Zschech, Don Moen (Executive), Chris Thomason (Executive)

Give Thanks

- Released: 1999
- Format: VCD
- Label: Integrity Music, Hosanna! Music, Integrity Asia
- Producer: Tom Brooks, Mark Gasbarro, Steve Merkel, Don Moen (Executive), Chris Thomason (Executive)

The Mercy Seat

- Released: 2000
- Format: CD, tape, download
- Label: Integrity, Hosanna! Music, Integrity Asia, Columbia, Sony Music
- Producer: Tom Brooks, Don Moen (Executive), Chris Thomason (Executive)

Heal Our Land (Don Moen & Paul Wilbur)

- Released: 2000
- Format: CD, tape, video, download
- Label: Integrity Music, Hosanna! Music, Integrity Asia
- Producer: Tom Brooks, Don Moen (Executive), Chris Thomason (Executive)

I Will Sing

- Released: 2000
- Format: CD, tape, video, DVD, VCD, download
- Label: Integrity, Hosanna! Music, Epic, Sony Music
- Producer: Paul Mills, Don Moen (Executive), Chris Thomason (Executive)

God in Us

- Released: 2001
- Format: CD, tape, download
- Label: Integrity, Hosanna! Music, Columbia, Sony Music
- Producer: Tom Fettke, Don Moen (Executive), Randy Vader (Executive)

God Will Make a Way: The Best of Don Moen

- Released: 2003
- Format: CD, tape, download
- Label: Integrity, Hosanna! Music, Epic, Sony Music
- Producer: Tom Brooks, Don Harris, Paul Mills, Don Moen (Executive), Chris Thomason (Executive)

Trono de Gracia

- Released: 2003
- Format: CD, tape, download
- Label: Integrity, Hosanna! Music, Columbia, Sony Music
- Producer: Miguel Angel "Malin" Villagran, Tom Brooks, Paul Mills, Don Moen (Executive), Keith Manwaring (Executive), Dario Navac (Executive)

Thank You Lord

- Released: 2004
- Format: CD, tape, video, DVD, VCD, download
- Label: Integrity Music, Hosanna! Music, CBN, Epic, Columbia, Sony Music
- Producer: David Hamilton, Don Moen (Executive), Chris Thomason (Executive)

23 Nonstop Best Songs

- Released: 2005
- Format: CD
- Label: Integrity Music, Hosanna! Music, Integrity Asia, Maranatha (Indonesia)
- Producer: Tom Brooks, Don Harris, Don Moen (Executive)

Arise: The Worship Legacy of Don Moen

- Released: 2006
- Format: Download
- Label: Integrity, Hosanna! Music, Columbia, Sony Music
- Producer: David Hamilton, Don Moen (Executive)

Hiding Place

- Released: 2006
- Format: CD, download
- Label: Integrity, Hosanna! Music, Columbia, Sony Music
- Producer: David Hamilton, Don Moen (Executive)

I Believe There Is More

- Released: 2008
- Format: CD, download
- Label: Integrity, Hosanna! Music, Columbia, Sony Music
- Producer: Don Moen, Michael Coleman (Executive)

With a Thankful Heart: The Best of Don Moen

- Released: 2011
- Format: CD
- Label: Integrity, Hosanna! Music, Integrity Asia
- Producer: Tom Brooks, David Hamilton, Don Harris, Paul Mills, Don Moen, Andy Skarda (Executive)

Uncharted Territory

- Released: 2011
- Format: CD, download
- Label: Don Moen Records, in:ciite, EMI Christian Music Group
- Producer: Don Moen (Producer and executive Producer), Chris Thomason (Executive)

Hymnbook

- Released: 2012
- Format: CD, download
- Label: Don Moen Records
- Producer: Don Moen (Producer and executive Producer), Tom Lane

Christmas: A Season of Hope

- Released: October 22, 2012
- Format: CD, download
- Label: Don Moen Records, in:ciite, EMI Christian Music Group
- Producer: David Hamilton, Don Moen (Executive), Chris Thomason (Executive)

Ultimate Collection

- Released: March 5, 2013
- Format: CD, download
- Label: Integrity, Hosanna! Music, Columbia, Sony Music
- Producer: Tom Brooks, David Hamilton, Paul Mills, Steve Merkel, Don Moen, C. Ryan Dunham (Executive)

Hymns of Hope

- Released: Fall 2013
- Format: CD, download
- Label: Don Moen Records
- Producer: David Hamilton, Don Moen (Executive)

By Special Request: Volume One

- Released: 2015
- Format: CD, download
- Label: Don Moen Records
- Producer: Don Moen (Producer and executive Producer)

God Will Make a Way: A Worship Musical

- Released: 2016
- Format: CD, download
- Label: Don Moen Records, Brentwood Benson
- Producer: Don Moen, Russell Mauldin, Luke Gambill (Executive), Johnathan Crumpton (Executive)

Grace (Don Moen & Frank Edwards)

- Released: 2016
- Format: Download
- Label: Don Moen Records

By Special Request: Volume Two

- Released: 2017
- Format: CD, download
- Label: Don Moen Records
- Producer: Don Moen (Producer and executive Producer)

Jehovah Wezi Manga (Don Moen & the Mahotella Queens)

- Released: 2017
- Format: download
- Label: Content Connect Africa

Don Moen Collection

- Released: 2020
- Format: download
- Label: Integrity Music

A Hungry Heart

- Released: 2020
- Format: download
- Label: Don Moen Records

Return to Me

- Released: 2021
- Format: download
- Label: Don Moen Records

Great is Your Mercy

- Released: 2022
- Format: download
- Label: Don Moen Records

Goodness of God (feat. Rachel Robinson)

- Released: 2022
- Format: download
- Label: Don Moen Records

Upper Room Sessions

- Released: 2022
- Format: download
- Label: Don Moen Records

Worship Today with Don Moen

- Released: 2023
- Format: download
- Label: Don Moen Records

By Special Request: Vol. 3

- Released: 2023
- Format: download
- Label: Don Moen Records

=== Other recordings ===
- Hatiku (1995)
- Behold the Lamb (1997)
- Healing (1998)
- The Smithton Outpouring (1999)
- Hope Changes Everything (2000)
- Mas de Ti (2000)
- Sing for Joy: A Songwriter's Heart (2002)
- Amor Sin Limites (2004)
- American Worship Gathering (2005)
- Arise: A Celebration of Worship (2006)
- Hope Changes Everything (2007)
- Cool Worship (2010)
- A Little Boy's Prayer (2010)
- Marvin L. Winans Presents: The Praise & Worship Experience (2012)
- Bishop Jerry L. Maynard Presents: The Cathedral of Praise Choir (2012)
- Day and Night Worship (2015)
- We Will Stand (2015)

== Awards and nominations ==
Year	Association	Category	Result
1992	Dove Awards	Song of the Year "God Will Make A Way"	Won
1992	Dove Awards	Creator – Children's Musical Album of the Year I'm a Helper	Nominated
1993	Dove Awards	Artist – Inspirational Album of the Year Worship with Don Moen	Won
1994	Dove Awards	Creator – Musical Album of the Year God with Us	Won
1995	Dove Awards	Creator – Musical Album of the Year Mighty Cross	Won
1998	Dove Awards	Creator – Musical of the Year Emmanuel Has Come	Nominated
1999	Dove Awards	Creator – Musical of the Year God for Us	Won
2001	Dove Awards	Spanish Language Album of the Year En Tu Presencia	Nominated
2003	Dove Awards	Country Recorded Song of the Year "God Is Good All the Time"	Nominated
2003	Dove Awards	Creator – Musical of the Year God in Us	Nominated
2004	Dove Awards	Spanish Language Album of the Year Trono de Gracia	Nominated
2015	Gospel Music Association	Global Lifetime Achievement Award	Won

Gold certification

- Give Thanks
