= When We All Get to Heaven =

Christian hymn written by Eliza Hewitt

"When We All Get to Heaven" is a popular Christian hymn. The lyrics were written in 1898 by Eliza Hewitt and the melody by Mrs. J. G. (Emily) Wilson. The two became acquainted at Methodist camp meetings in New Jersey. Hewitt was cousin to Edgar Page Stites, another well-known hymnist who wrote the lyrics to "Beulah Land."

== History ==
“When We All Get to Heaven” was first published in 1898 in Pentecostal Praises, a Methodist collection of hymns edited by William J. Kirkpatrick and Henry L. Gilmour. The hymn was originally published with four stanzas and a refrain. Wilson's melody is known by the tune name “HEAVEN”. Hewitt and Wilson are said to have met at a Methodist camp meeting in Ocean Grove, New Jersey.

Hymnologist Chris Fenner has suggested that composer John R. Sweney was likely instrumental in introducing Hewitt and Wilson at an Ocean Grove camp meeting. The hymn was associated with the camp-meeting tradition at Ocean Grove, New Jersey.

Wilson’s melody is in the key of C major..

== Lyrics ==
The hymn is written in 8.7.8.7 meter with a refrain. The lyrics focus on Christian hope for heaven, while also encouraging faithfulness and perseverance during earthly life. The hymn has been widely included in hymnals, with Hymnary documenting its appearance in more than 400 hymnals.

The first stanza draws on John 14:2, which describes a place being prepared in heaven. The second stanza looks forward to relief from earthly suffering and to the hope of heaven. The third stanza encourages believers to remain faithful and continue serving Christ. The fourth stanza anticipates entering heaven and seeing Christ.

The refrain brings these themes together in a shared celebration of Christ’s final victory.

== Recordings ==
- Willie Nelson and Bobbie Nelson recorded a version of the hymn for the 1996 album Just as I Am.
- Brad Paisley recorded the hymn for his 2007 album 5th Gear. Alan Jackson recorded the hymn for his 2006 gospel album Precious Memories.
- Alvin Slaughter recorded the hymn for his 1996 album God Can!
- Barbara Mandrell recorded the hymn for her 1989 album Precious Memories: 20 Hymns and Gospel Classics.
- Casting Crowns recorded the hymn for the 2015 album Glorious Day: Hymns of Faith.
- Gordon Mote recorded the hymn for his 2015 album Hymns and Songs of Inspiration.
- Lynda Randle recorded a live version of the hymn in 2007.
- Luther Barnes & The Red Budd Gospel Choir recorded the hymn as the title track of their 1983 album When We All Get to Heaven.
- The Blackwood Brothers Quartet recorded the hymn for their 2018 album A Cappella Hymns.
- Bill Gaithere, Gloria Gaither and the Homecoming Friends recorded the hymn for the 2003 album Heaven.
- The Hayes Family recorded the hymn for their 2008 album Hymns of the Faith.
- The Collingsworth Family recorded the hymn for their 2013 album Hymns From Home.
- Dean Phelps recorded an arrangement of the hymn for his album Picking the Faith.
- Redeemed Quartet recorded the hymn for their 2023 album Those Were the Days.
