= Let Him In Anyway =

Single by Blake Shelton

from the album For Recreational Use Only
- Released: February 9, 2026
- Genre: Country; Christian
- Length: 3:17
- Label: Wheelhouse
- Songwriters: Zach Abend; Kyle Clark; Michael Hardy; Carson Wallace
- Producer: Scott Hendricks

Blake Shelton singles chronology
"Stay Country or Die Tryin'" (2025)	"Let Him In Anyway" (2026)

Lyric video
- "Let Him In Anyway" on YouTube

"Let Him In Anyway" is a song by the American country singer Blake Shelton, released as the third official commercial single from his thirteenth studio album, For Recreational Use Only. Initially released as a promotional single ahead of the album, on March 14, 2025. The song was written by Zach Abend, Kyle Clark, Michael Hardy and Carson Wallace. It impacted US country radio on February 9, 2026.

== Background and music ==
Shelton stated on the song that it was "one of the more powerful lyrics and just overall pieces of music that I've ever gotten a chance to work on".

== Release and reception ==
The song was originally released as a promotional single on March 14, 2025. It was included on For Recreational Use Only on May 9, 2025. "Let Him In Anyway" was later released as the third commercial single on February 9, 2026. Billboard writer Jessica Nicholson notes it "offers the spiritual-minded tale of someone pleading for divine forgiveness for a friend who never fully went all-in on redemption." American Songwriter critic Cindy Watts calls it a "offers the spiritual-minded tale of someone pleading for divine forgiveness for a friend who never fully went all-in on redemption."

== Personnel ==
Adapted from Tidal:

- Blake Shelton – lead vocals
- Bryan Sutton – acoustic guitar
- Jimmie Lee Sloas – bass
- Nir Z – drums, shaker
- Sam Bergeson – electric guitar
- Tom Bukovac – electric guitar
- Troy Lancaster – electric guitar
- Gordon Mote – piano

== Charts ==
Chart performance for "Let Him In Anyway"
Chart (2026)	Peak position
Canada Country (Billboard)	33
US Hot Country Songs (Billboard)	45
US Country Airplay (Billboard)	15
