= String Quartet No. 1 (Ives) =

Musical composition

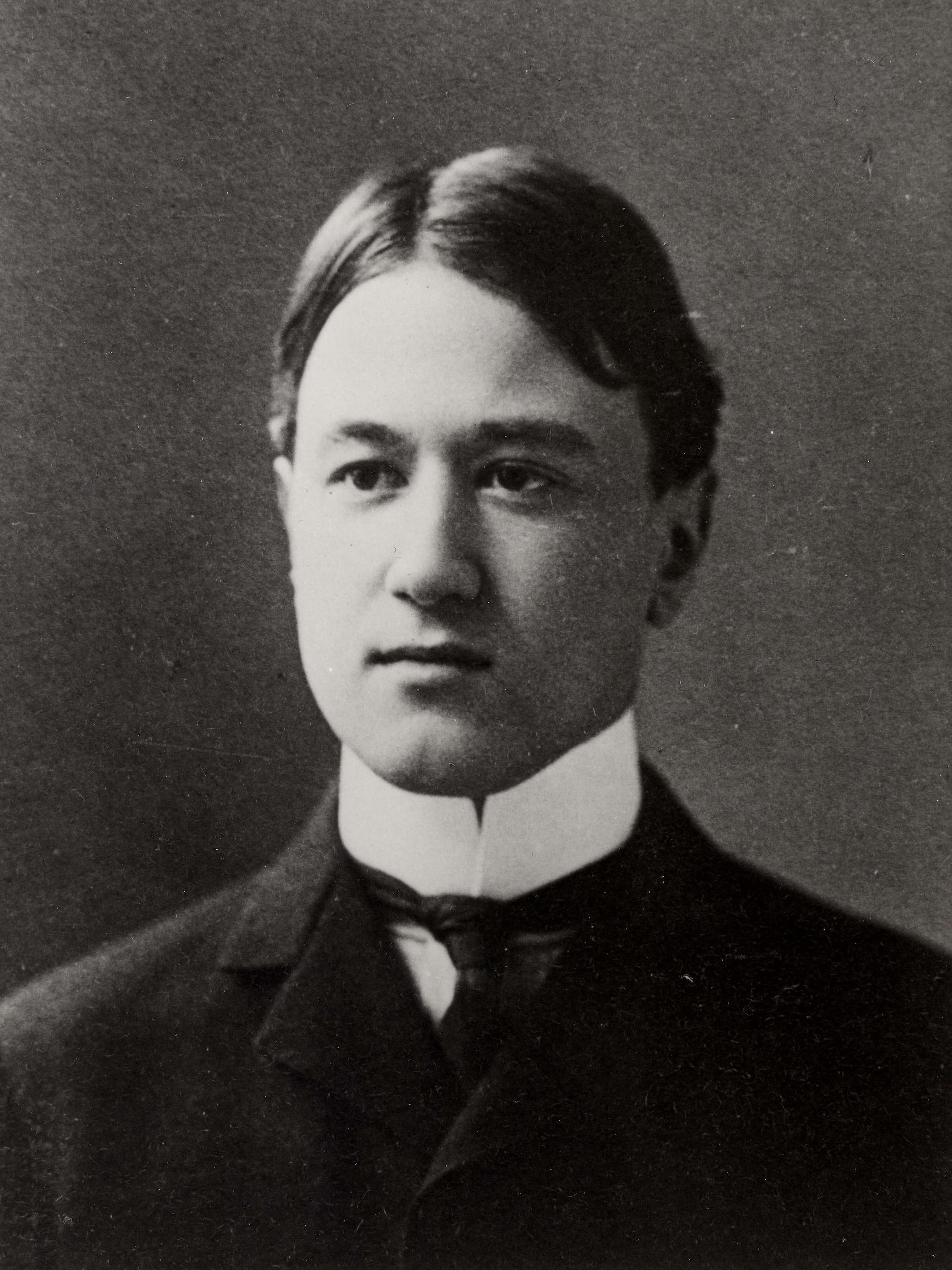
Composer Charles Ives's graduation portrait from Yale University, c. June 1898

String Quartet No. 1 is a musical composition by Charles Ives. Music historian and theorist Robert P. Morgan wrote that the quartet "was Ives's first mature composition of extended length, and its extraordinary fluency gives ample evidence of his solid control of traditional musical techniques. Moreover, the work is considerably more than a facile exercise based on classical models; there are already indications of the Ives to come, in the extensive quotations and, above all, in the composer's ability to bend the form to suit the idiosyncrasies of his own musical inclinations."

== Background ==
The quartet, subtitled "From the Salvation Army" and "A Revival Service," was written in 1896, while Ives was a sophomore at Yale, and was composed under the supervision of Ives's teacher Horatio Parker. Three of the movements have their origins in pieces for organ and strings originally played at a revival service, and were based on gospel hymns. After arranging these for string quartet, Ives prepended a fugue written for Parker's counterpoint class to create a four-movement work.

In 1909, Ives removed the first movement and began orchestrating it for inclusion in what would become his Fourth Symphony. He also renumbered the remaining movements, originally II, III, and IV, as I, II, and III. Ives's work list dated 1937–50 lists the quartet in its three-movement form: "Prelude, Offertory, and Postlude."

After Ives's death, John Kirkpatrick discovered the original opening movement in the collection of manuscripts bequeathed to Yale, and reattached it to the quartet. This alteration has not been met with universal approval: composer Bernard Hermann, who worked with Ives and conducted a number of his pieces, disagreed with Kirkpatrick's decision, stating: "I still don't know where Kirkpatrick got that fugue which he tacked on, but that's his business. It belongs to the Fourth Symphony. I don't think it fits the First Quartet at all." Ives biographer Jan Swafford wrote: "Ives was probably right to remove the fugue - except in the general sense of being based on a revival hymn, it has no stylistic or thematic connection with the other movements, and it throws off the overall key scheme... And Kirkpatrick was wrong to put it back - as if Ives had no right to revise, and improve, his own music. Performances of the quartet the way Ives intended it will reveal a tighter, more effective piece. The fugue, too spacious and sonorous for a string quartet anyway, belongs in the Fourth Symphony..."

The first documented complete performance of the quartet took place at the Museum of Modern Art in New York City on April 24, 1957. It was played, in its three-movement form, by the Kohon String Quartet, who also issued the first recording of the work in 1963 (Vox STDL-501120). The quartet was first published in 1961 by Peer International, in a score which includes all four movements.

== Music ==
The piece is composed for the standard string quartet of two violins, viola, and cello. The four published movements are:

1. Chorale: Andante con moto
2. Prelude: Allegro
3. Offertory: Adagio cantabile
4. Postlude: Allegro marziale

Jan Swafford wrote: "the First Quartet is 'cyclic' - melodic lines recur from movement to movement, a nineteenth-century formal device going back to Berlioz and Schumann." Regarding movements II, III, and IV, which were intended as I, II, and III as per Ives' 1909 revision, Ives scholar J. Peter Burkholder stated: "There is an extraordinary motivic unity among these three movements, due to innate similarities among the source tunes - similarities Ives carefully exploits - and to the appearance in each movement of material that appears in the others."

The first movement (Chorale) is fugal in form. Its subject is based on Lowell Mason's "Missionary Hymn" ("From Greenland's Icy Mountains"), while the countersubject is based on Oliver Holden's "Coronation" ("All hail the power of Jesus' name!"). Burkholder noted that "over the course of the movement, all four phrases of the hymn tune appear in order... this is much more a paraphrase in fugal style than it is a genuine fugue, shaped more directly by its source tune than by the usual fugal expositions and episodes." He concluded that "the presentation of the hymn tune is the focus of the movement. In this sense, it is like the chorale preludes and chorale fantasias of J. S. Bach, and indeed Ives called it 'a kind of Chorale-Prelude,' showing his awareness of Bach's procedures."

The second movement (Prelude) is in ABA form. The A section is based on the hymn "Beulah Land" by John R. Sweney, although, according to Burkholder, "[e]ven listeners who know "Beulah Land" are less likely to recognize the opening period as being derived from the hymn than they are to hear it as vaguely familiar." Burkholder cites Ives' use of this tune as an example of how he "reshapes a melody to fit a new function and in the process changes its style as well." The B section of the second movement is based on "Shining Shore" by George Frederick Root, transformations of which serve as the basis of the B sections of movements III and IV.

The third movement (Offertory) is also in ABA form. The primary theme of the A section is based on the hymn "Nettleton" ("Come thou Fount of every blessing"), attributed to Asahel Nettleton or John Wyeth. In his Memos, Ives wrote: "'Nettleton' was one of the Gospel and Camp Meeting Hymns, and down in the Redding Camp Meetings I heard it sung... I used it, or partly suggested it, in a string quartet..." The B section is again based largely on transformations of "Shining Shore".

The fourth movement (Postlude) is again in ABA form. The primary theme of its A section is based on "Webb" ("Stand up, stand up for Jesus") by George James Webb as well as "Coronation" and "Shining Shore", while its B section is again derived from "Shining Shore". It features one of Ives' first uses of polymeter: composing in 3/4 over 4/4 time.

Regarding the pervasive use of "Shining Shore" as source material, Burkholder wrote: "When Ives... consistently and obviously presents fragments from a tune, he draws attention to that tune as an idea and makes us expect to hear more of it. In almost every instance where this happens in his music, the tune has a greater importance for the work than we may realize at first." He also noted that "Shining Shore" is "present in all three movements and linked through melodic transformation or resemblance to the... other source tunes. In each movement, it is the main source for the middle-section theme, and its opening motive appears explicitly at some point. Whenever two or more tunes are mixed, it is present..." Burkholder stated that Ives' use of cyclic forms "is apparent not only in his obvious concern to unify this quartet through such means, but also in the many works written over the next two decades that use cyclic unification, including the first three symphonies, the two piano sonatas, and the Third Violin Sonata."
