= For Recreational Use Only =

Studio album by Blake Shelton
- Released: May 9, 2025
- Recorded: 2024–2025
- Genre: Country
- Length: 39:56
- Label: Wheelhouse
- Producer: Scott Hendricks

Blake Shelton chronology
Body Language (2021)	For Recreational Use Only (2025)

Singles from For Recreational Use Only
- 1. "Texas" Released: November 15, 2024; 2. "Stay Country or Die Tryin'" Released: May 19, 2025; 3. "Let Him In Anyway" Released: February 9, 2026

For Recreational Use Only is the thirteenth studio album by American country singer Blake Shelton. It was released on May 9, 2025, through Wheelhouse Records.

== Background ==
Blake Shelton started writing the album's songs after the success of "Pour Me a Drink", his collaboration with Post Malone; according to Shelton, the success of the collaboration "lit a fire under" Shelton. The album was announced on March 14, 2025.

== Promotion ==
"Texas" was released as the album's lead single on November 15, 2024. It peaked at number 61 on the Billboard Hot 100. "Let Him In Anyway" and "Stay Country or Die Tryin'" were released as promotional singles ahead of the album. According to American Songwriter, Gwen Stefani loves the former song. "Stay Country or Die Tryin'" was released as the album's second single to country radio on May 19, 2025. The music video for "Stay Country or Die Tryin'" uses AI as a tribute to country life and land. On May 8, "Hangin' On" was released as a promotional single. On February 19, 2026, "Let Him In Anyway" was released as the album's third single.

== Critical reception ==
Professional ratings
Review scores
Source	Rating
AllMusic	3/5 stars
Entertainment Focus	4.5/5 stars
Holler	5/5 stars

The American newspaper The Washington Post stated that it is a "fitting declaration for both his latest project and the current state of his career"

== Track listing ==
No.	Title	Writer(s)	Length
1.	"Stay Country or Die Tryin'"	Beau Bailey; Graham Barham; Sam Ellis; Drew Parker	3:41
2.	"Texas"	Johnny Clawson; Josh Dorr; Lalo Guzman; Kyle Sturrock	2:49
3.	"Hangin' On" (featuring Gwen Stefani)	Ellis; Greylan James; Charles Kelley	3:26
4.	"Strangers"	Zach Crowell; Michael Hardy; Jameson Rodgers	3:21
5.	"Let Him In Anyway"	Zach Abend; Kyle Clark; Hardy; Carson Wallace	3:17
6.	"Heaven Sweet Home" (featuring Craig Morgan)	Sarah Buxton; Jake Rose; Chris Tompkins	3:41
7.	"Life's Been Coming Too Fast"	David Lee Murphy; Lindsay Rimes; Craig Wiseman	3:10
8.	"Don't Mississippi"	Ross Copperman; Ben Hayslip; Shane McAnally; Josh Osborne	3:07
9.	"All of My Love"	Blake Shelton; Matt McGinn; Colton Swon; Zach Swon	3:39
10.	"Cold Can"	Andrew DeRoberts; Osborne; Bobby Pinson	3:06
11.	"The Keys"	Brock Berryhill; Jay Brunswick; Pinson	2:51
12.	"Years" (featuring John Anderson)	John Anderson; Dan Auerbach; David Ferguson; Pat McLaughlin	3:48

== Personnel ==
Credits adapted from Tidal.

=== Musicians ===
- Blake Shelton – lead vocals
- Nir Z – drums (all tracks), tambourine (tracks 1, 8, 9), shaker (5), programming (6, 11), congas (9)
- Troy Lancaster – electric guitar
- Tom Bukovac – electric guitar (tracks 1–5, 7–10)
- Gordon Mote – piano (tracks 1–3, 5, 6, 8, 10, 12), Hammond B3 organ (1, 5–9), electric piano (2, 4, 7, 9), organ (2), synthesizer (4, 12); celeste piano, strings (12)
- Sam Bergeson – electric guitar, programming (tracks 1–3, 5, 7–10); slide guitar (1, 5, 9), additional guitar (1), synthesizer (2, 3, 7, 9), backing vocals (2, 7), acoustic guitar (2, 9), bass (3); keyboards, percussion (7); lap steel guitar (10)
- Jimmie Lee Sloas – bass (tracks 1–3, 5, 7–10)
- Bryan Sutton – acoustic guitar (tracks 1, 3–5, 8–10), mandolin (1, 9), guitar (8)
- Perry Coleman – backing vocals (tracks 1, 2, 4–8, 10, 11)
- Justin Niebank – programming (tracks 1, 4–6, 8, 9, 11, 12)
- Aubrey Haynie – fiddle (tracks 1, 8)
- Drew Parker – backing vocals (track 1)
- Ilya Toshinskiy – acoustic guitar (tracks 2, 6, 7, 11)
- Pat Bergeson – electric guitar, guitar (track 2)
- Gwen Stefani – lead vocals (track 3)
- Mark Hill – bass (tracks 4, 6, 11)
- Paul Franklin – steel guitar (tracks 4, 6, 11)
- Blair Masters – synthesizer (tracks 6, 11), steel guitar (6), piano (11)
- Adam Shoenfeld – electric guitar (tracks 6, 11)
- Kara Britz – backing vocals (tracks 6, 12)
- Craig Morgan – lead vocals (track 6)
- Carla Harris – backing vocals (track 7)
- Chuck Aly – backing vocals (track 7)
- James Furlough – backing vocals (track 7)
- Keely Hendricks – backing vocals (track 7)
- Kenny Sweeney – backing vocals (track 7)
- Kevin Harris – backing vocals (track 7)
- Mason Rudolph – backing vocals (track 7)
- Remy Garrison – backing vocals (track 7)
- Shannon Finnegan – backing vocals (track 7)
- Teri Hendricks – backing vocals (track 7)
- The Never Beens – backing vocals (track 7)
- Tim Jenkins – backing vocals (track 7)
- Torey Harding – backing vocals (track 7)
- William Clay – backing vocals (track 7)
- Colton Swon – backing vocals (track 9)
- Zach Swon – backing vocals (track 9)
- Larry Franklin – fiddle (track 10)
- Seth Taylor – acoustic guitar (track 12)
- Blair Whitlow – backing vocals (track 12)
- Brandon Winbush – backing vocals (track 12)
- Robert Bailey – backing vocals (track 12)
- Vicki Hampton – backing vocals (track 12)
- Wendy Moten – backing vocals (track 12)
- Mike Brignardello – bass (track 12)
- John Anderson – lead vocals (track 12)
- Russ Pahl – steel guitar (track 12)

=== Technical ===
- Scott Hendricks – production, engineering
- Andrew Mendelson – mastering
- Justin Niebank – mixing (tracks 1, 2, 4–6, 8, 9, 11, 12), engineering (all tracks)
- Jeff Juliano – mixing (track 3)
- Matt McClure – mixing (tracks 7, 10)
- Brian David Willis – engineering (tracks 1–4, 6, 7, 9–12), editing (1, 3–5, 7, 9, 10)
- Sam Bergeson – engineering (tracks 1–5, 7–10), additional mixing (1)
- Sam Ellis – engineering (track 1)
- Joey Stanca – engineering (track 2)
- Sean Badum – engineering (tracks 6, 11), engineering assistance (4)
- Clarke Schleicher – engineering (tracks 6, 11)
- Kelsey Porter – engineering (tracks 6, 11)
- Zach Swon – engineering (track 9)
- Terry Watson – engineering (track 12), engineering assistance (4)
- Jacob Spitzer – engineering (track 12)
- Drew Bollman – additional mixing (tracks 2–12)
- Shannon Finnegan – production assistance (track 2)
- Nate Juliano – mixing assistance (track 3)
- Caroline Whitaker – engineering assistance (track 4)

== Charts ==
Chart performance for For Recreational Use Only
Chart (2025)	Peak position
Australian Country Albums (ARIA)	33
UK Album Downloads (Official Charts)	49
UK Country Albums (Official Charts)	2
UK Independent Albums (Official Charts)	38
US Billboard 200	46
US Independent Albums (Billboard)	8
US Top Country Albums (Billboard)	8
