= Hangin' On (Blake Shelton song) =

Promotional single by Blake Shelton (featuring Gwen Stefani)

from the album For Recreational Use Only
- Released: May 8, 2025 (promotional single); May 9, 2025 (For Recreational Use Only)
- Length: 3:26
- Label: Wheelhouse
- Songwriters: Ellis; Greylan James; Charles Kelley
- Producer: Scott Hendricks

Official audio
- "Hangin' On" (featuring Gwen Stefani)" on YouTube

"Hangin' On" is a song by Blake Shelton and Gwen Stefani, released on the former's 2025 album For Recreational Use Only. It was also released as a promotional single on May 8, 2025.

== Background and release ==
On July 3, 2021, Blake Shelton married Gwen Stefani, the lead singer of the American rock band No Doubt. Shelton and Stefani were both drawn to the song, with Shelton stating that "We were both like, 'I'm in if you're in[.] The song just has one of those choruses that just hits you and knocks you down." The album was released on May 9, 2025, and sequenced as the third track on the album. It is a breakup song, although fans believe they will break up, the rumor is false.

== Release and reception ==
Entertainment Focus critic James Daykin calls it a "smouldering, modern country slow burn that balances heartbreak with harmony," Holler Country Music writer Alli Patton writes that it "lands much like the others – with a hollow thud".. Shelton himself stated that "It’s a challenge, but I think the song is really well written, and we love it".

== Credits and personnel ==
Adapted from Tidal:

=== Performers ===
- Blake Shelton – lead vocal
- Gwen Stefani – lead vocal
- Bryan Sutton – acoustic guitar
- Jimmie Lee Sloas – bass guitar
- Sam Bergeson – bass guitar, electric guitar, synthesizer, programmer, recording engineer, sound engineer
- Nir Z – drums
- Tom Bukovac – electric guitar
- Troy Lancaster – electric guitar
- Gordon Mote – piano

=== Technical ===
- Scott Hendricks – producer, recording engineer, sound engineer
- Drew Bollman – additional mixing engineer
- Andrew Mendelson – mastering engineer
- Adam Battershell – mastering second engineer
- Andrew Darby – mastering second engineer
- Luke Armentrout – mastering second engineer
- Taylor Chadwick – mastering second engineer
- Justin Niebank – mixing engineer, recording engineer
- Shannon Finnegan – production coordinator
- Joey Stanca – recording, second engineer
- Paul Simmons – recording, second engineer
