= Eliza Edmunds Hewitt =

American hymn writer and teacher (1851–1920)

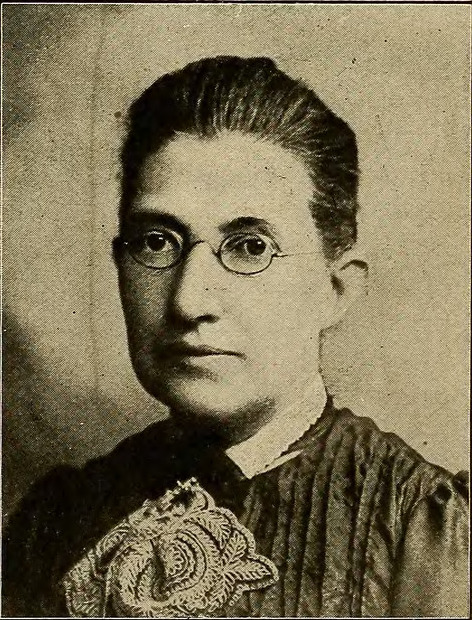
Eliza Edmunds Hewitt

Eliza Edmunds Hewitt (June 28, 1851 – April 24, 1920), also known as Eliza Jane Hewitt, was an American hymn writer and teacher. She was active in Olivet Presbyterian Church and Tabernacle Presbyterian Church in Philadelphia. She later joined Calvin Presbyterian Church, where she taught Sunday school until her death.

== Biography ==
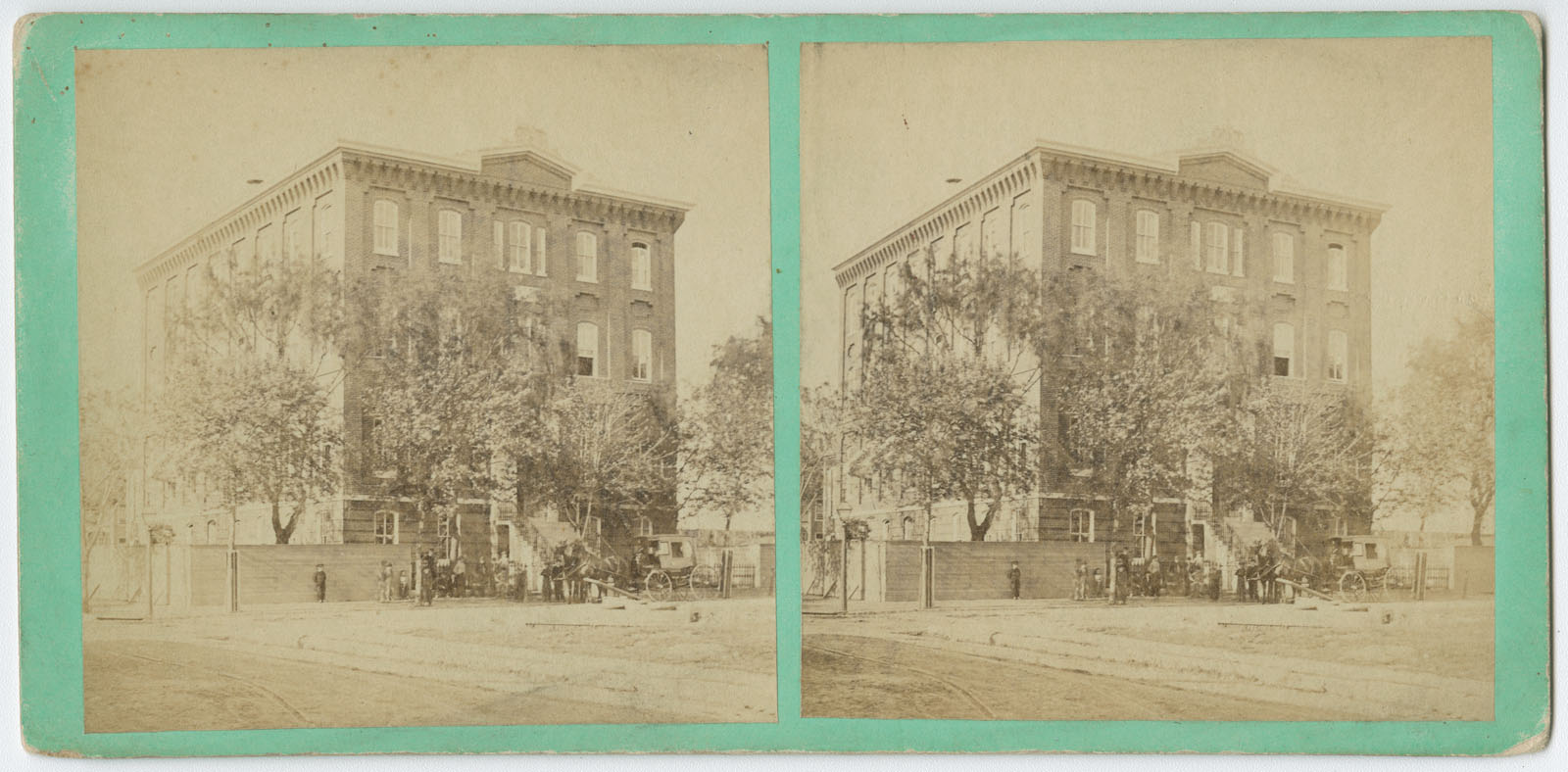
Northern Home for Friendless Children

Born on June 28, 1851, in Philadelphia, Pennsylvania, Eliza Edmunds Hewitt was the daughter of sea Capt. James Stratton Hewitt and Zeruiah Stites Edmunds. She completed her school education at the Girls' Normal School in Philadelphia where she graduated as valedictorian. She later started teaching at the Northern Home for Friendless Children, but her professional career was cut short by a serious spinal problem caused by a student who struck her across the back with a heavy slate for being disciplined. As a result, she was put in a heavy cast for six months. Though partially recovering, she remained an invalid for an extended period of her life. During her prolonged convalescence, she studied English literature and started writing poems for the primary department of her church. She soon became a prolific writer of children's verses.

Despite her health problems, she showed interest in Sunday school work and began teaching the primary class. She later became Sunday school superintendent at the Northern Home for Friendless Children and Calvin Presbyterian Church. She prepared study materials for Sunday schools and regularly contributed for children's periodicals.

== Poems and hymns ==
Hewitt is credited with authoring over 2,100 poems and hymns, occasionally under the pseudonym Lidie H. Edmunds. Her poems have been set to music by a variety of composers including John R. Sweney, B. D. Ackley, Charles H. Gabriel, Edmund Simon Lorenz, Homer Rodeheaver and William J. Kirkpatrick. In 1884, a copy of her hymn Winning Souls for Jesus, composed for her pastor Rev. Henry C. McCook while an invalid, was placed in the cornerstone of Tabernacle Presbyterian Church, West Philadelphia. (Note: Church designed by Theophilus P. Chandler Jr. and known today as Tabernacle United Church.)

A number of her hymns have been translated into different languages, including Norwegian.

She was a close friend of Fanny Crosby, prolific hymnist. She often attended the Methodist camp meetings at Ocean Grove, New Jersey. Her cousin, Edgar Page Stites, was also a hymn writer. She lived her entire life in Philadelphia, where she died on April 24, 1920. She is buried in Woodlands Cemetery.

== Popular works ==
Some of her popular poems and hymns include

- More About Jesus Would I Know (1887)
- Sunshine in the Soul (1887)
- Stepping in the Light (1890)
- The Very Same Jesus (1891)
- Not One Forgotten (1893)
- Will There Be Any Stars? (1897)
- Give Me Thy Heart, Says the Father Above (1898)
- When We All Get to Heaven (1898)
