= Stars in My Crown =

Stars in My Crown may refer to:

- an 1897 hymn by Eliza Edmunds Hewitt
- Stars in My Crown (film), a 1950 western film starring Joel McCrea
- Stars in My Crown (album), a 2007 album by Jorma Kaukonen
