= Symphony No. 4 (Ives) =

Symphony by Charles Ives

- by Charles Ives
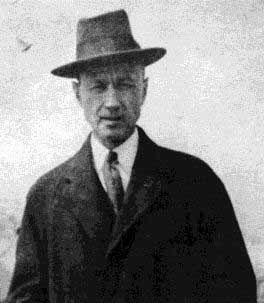
- Ives, c. 1913
- Catalogue: S. 4 (K. 1A4)
- Text: Two hymns: "Watchman" and "Bethany"
- Language: English
- Composed: 1910 – mid-1920s
- Duration: about 30 minutes
- Movements: 4
- Scoring: orchestra and choir

Premiere
- Date: 26 April 1965
- Location: Carnegie Hall
- Conductor: Leopold Stokowski
- Performers: American Symphony Orchestra

Charles Ives's Symphony No. 4, S. 4 (K. 1A4) was written between 1910 and the mid-1920s (the second movement "Comedy" was the last to be composed, most likely in 1924). The symphony is notable for its multilayered complexity—typically requiring two conductors in performance—and for its large and varied orchestration. Combining elements and techniques of Ives's previous compositional work, this has been called "one of his most definitive works"; Ives' biographer, Jan Swafford, has called it "Ives's climactic masterpiece".

== Structure ==
The symphony is in four movements:

1. Prelude: Maestoso
2. Comedy: Allegretto
3. Fugue: Andante moderato con moto
4. Finale: Very slowly – Largo maestoso

Although the symphony requires a large orchestra, the duration is only about half an hour.

=== I. Prelude: Maestoso ===
This movement and the second movement were first performed in the Town Hall, New York City, on January 29, 1927, by 50 members of the New York Philharmonic Orchestra on a Pro Musica International Referendum Concert conducted by Eugene Goossens. While 50 players are sufficient for the chamber-like scoring of the first movement, the second movement in reality requires almost twice as many players, yet this was Ives's only experience of hearing any parts of the Symphony performed live. In contrast to Ives's other works for large orchestra, which begin in quiet and meditative moods, the first-movement Prelude starts with a strong, maestoso, fortissimo bassline, immediately followed by a rising trumpet fanfare. A quiet passage follows. The movement ends with chorus singing John Bowring's Epiphany hymn "Watchman, Tell Us of the Night". Unlike the bold beginning, the movement dies away, quadruple-pianissimo, at the end.

=== II. Comedy: Allegretto ===
Ives bases this "Comedy" movement on Hawthorne's story "The Celestial Railroad", itself a trope on John Bunyan's Pilgrim's Progress. It is an orchestral expansion—not merely a simple orchestration—of Ives's piano solo, The Celestial Railroad (ca. 1924). As such, the "Comedy" movement is a composition of the 1920s, and may represent one of Ives's last orchestral endeavors. It is his most extreme essay in overlapping thematic material, found also in his Holidays Symphony, but is most complex in its use of multimetrics and temporal dysynchronies, and is compositionally his most complex orchestral work. Tunes quoted include "In the Sweet By-and-By", "Beulah Land", "Marching Through Georgia", "Ye Christian Heralds", "Jesus, Lover of my Soul" and "Nearer, My God, to Thee". The disjunctive metrical and temporal complexity of this movement requires at least one additional conductor. The music builds to several riotous climaxes before ebbing away.

=== III. Fugue: Andante moderato con moto ===
An arrangement of this movement by future film composer Bernard Herrmann (notable for his scores to Alfred Hitchcock's films) was performed in New York on May 10, 1933, but Ives's version was not performed until the integral premiere of the entire Symphony in 1965. It is a mild orchestral expansion (compared with the extreme expansion of the Comedy movement from its piano solo source) of a student fugue exercise Ives composed during his years at Yale University; in its orchestral form, it ends with a brief quotation of "Joy to the World". According to Elliott Carter, the movement "is about seventy-five percent the same as the first movement of [Ives'] First String Quartet" and "has a few irregular bar lengths, polyrhythms, and dissonances added especially at the expanded climax near the end." Ives called it "an expression of the reaction of life into formalism and ritualism". Paradoxically, because of its juxtaposition with the other three harmonically, tonally and rhythmically complex movements, Ives biographer Jan Swafford calls this most outwardly simple and conservative movement "in a way the most revolutionary movement of all".

=== IV. Finale: Very slowly – Largo maestoso ===
The symphony ends with what Ives called "an apotheosis of the preceding content, in terms that have something to do with the reality of existence and its religious experience". It employs a separate percussion ensemble that plays in a separate tempo from the main orchestra; the temporal relationship between the two groups changes over the course of the movement in a tightly controlled and exact manner, which is one of the many challenges facing conductors and performers. The first performance of the Finale to the symphony was part of the integral premiere of the Symphony on April 26, 1965, by the American Symphony Orchestra under Leopold Stokowski, some 11 years after Ives's death. In his Memos, Ives wrote that the movement "seems to me the best, compared with the other movements, or for that matter with any other thing that I've done."

== Composition ==
In Henry Bellamann's program note to the 1927 premiere of the first and second movements of the symphony (a program note that seems to be ghost-written by Ives, as his tone of voice and use of language is obvious throughout), the program of the symphony is described this way:

The aesthetic program of the work is that of many of the greatest literary and musical masterpieces of the world—the searching questions of What? and Why? which the spirit of man asks of life. This is particularly the sense of the prelude. The ... succeeding movements are the diverse answers in which existence replies.

In his Memos, Ives misquotes Bellamann's program note by attributing to it the famous description of the Finale (hence providing further proof that he had supplied descriptive text to Bellamann for the note, with Bellamann dropping the Finale's description because of its absence on the 1927 performance): "The last movement is an apotheosis of the preceding content, in terms that have something to do with the reality of existence and its religious experience."

The symphony is distinguished by its use of multimetrics (i.e. simultaneous use of different meters) as well as temporal dyssynchronies (i.e. simultaneous use of different tempos). For example, in the second movement there is a passage (famously called the "Collapse Section") in which the orchestra divides into two groups, one playing in a slow 3/2 meter, the other in 4/4. Initially, the two groups are synchronized (with one measure of 3/2 equaling one measure of 4/4), but then the 4/4 group accelerates on top of the 3/2 group and collapses, thereafter waiting for the 3/2 group to catch up with them, at which point the orchestra resynchronizes as a single unit. This is but one of many extremely novel temporal effects in this work.

The fourth movement is distinguished by a rhythmic plan in which there is a division between the main orchestra and a separate group of percussion; the two groups play in precise temporal ratios to one another, and obtaining the temporal ratios between the two groups is one of the chief challenges of performing the movement. Also novel in the symphony is the use of quarter tones, heard both in the strings as well as in a dedicated quarter-tone piano that assumes 24 notes per octave. In the second movement, the quarter-tone piano noodles a filigree pattern in quarter and regular tones to accompany a solo violin that intones the hymn "Beulah Land". Ives here was anticipating a double-manual keyboard, with one manual at regular pitch and the other a quarter tone higher, such as those made by August Förster in Germany.

== Instrumentation ==
The symphony is scored for a very large orchestra:

Distant choir ensemble, offstage

harp
5 violins

Woodwinds

piccolo
3 flutes
2 oboes
3 clarinets in B♭ (the 1st clarinet optionally playing A in the first movement)
tenor saxophone in B♭ and baritone saxophone in E♭ (one or two players), optionally replaced by a third bassoon
2 bassoons

Brass

4 horns in F
6 trumpets in C (5th doubling cornet in C)
4 trombones
tuba

Percussion (8 to 10 players)

xylophone (optional)
2 bells, high and low
timpani
triangle
Indian drum
piccolo timpano
snare drum
bass drum
cymbals
2 tam-tams, light and heavy

B.U. Ensemble (spatially separated from the main orchestra):

snare drum
Indian drum
bass drum
cymbals
tam-tam

SATB Chorus

Keyboards

celesta
Ether organ (optional) (Note: A reference to one of Léon Theremin's instruments. Formerly thought to be the "space controlled" theremin instrument but now believed to be his keyboard harmonium.)
quarter-tone piano (Note: This used to be realized by two pianos tuned a quarter tone apart, but the Performance Edition of the symphony provides a special tuning for single acoustic piano or digital keyboard.)
orchestral piano (4-hands)
solo piano
organ

Strings

violins I, 12 to 18 players
violins II, 12 to 16 players
violas, 12 to 14 players
cellos, 10 to 12 players
double basses, 8 to 10 players

"extra" strings, on or off stage:

violins, 2 players
viola, 1 player

The mixed chorus performs a setting of the hymn "Watchman" in the first movement and a wordless intonation of the hymn "Bethany" in the last movement.

The first and last movements employ a spatially-separated ensemble of 5 violins and harp. The last movement employs a spatially-separated group of percussion.

The size of the orchestra is so large that if a maximum force of musicians were required, you would need 131 musicians in the orchestra (+offstage) and an extra two choirs.

== History and reception ==
The symphony did not have a complete performance until Leopold Stokowski conducted it with the American Symphony Orchestra at Carnegie Hall on April 26, 1965, 11 years after Ives's death.

It was soon recorded by the same forces for the first time for the Columbia label.

The 1965 performance score, published by G. Schirmer (AMP), has been supplanted by a new Charles Ives Society Critical Edition, 2011 (ed. by William Brooks, James Sinclair, Kenneth Singleton, Wayne Shirley, and Thomas M. Brodhead), which presents the music in the largely unperformable but compositionally intriguing state in which Ives left it in his manuscripts, and then a necessary corresponding Performance Score (edited by Thomas M. Brodhead), which was premiered at the Lucerne Festival, August 26, 2012, under the baton of conductor Peter Eötvös.

== Bibliography ==
- Burkholder, Peter, (work-list with James B. Sinclair and Gayle Sherwood). "Charles Ives", Grove Music Online, ed. L. Macy (accessed August 6, 2006), grovemusic.com (subscription access).
- Ives, Charles (1990). Symphony No. 4; Performance Score (facsimile ed.). G. Schirmer, Inc.
- Stone, Kurt (1966). "Ives's Fourth Symphony: A Review". The Musical Quarterly 52, no. 1 (January): 1–16.
- Swafford, Jan (1988). Charles Ives: A Life With Music. New York: W. W. Norton & Company. ISBN 0-393-31719-6.
