= Graham Barham =

- Born: Graham Barham; October 13, 1998 (age 27); Oak Ridge, Louisiana, US
- Genres: Country pop; trap
- Occupation: Singer-songwriter
- Years active: 2022–present
- Label: Disruptor Records
- Website: grahambarham.com

Graham Barham (born October 13, 1998) is an American country pop singer-songwriter. He has released three extended plays, North of Hell (2023), Oil Money (2025), whose title track was a viral TikTok hit, and Whiskey Rain (2025). Barham has also written songs for various country music artists, including Tyler Braden's 2024 hit, "Devil You Know", and Blake Shelton's 2025 hit, "Stay Country or Die Tryin'", both of which Barham also provided backing vocals.

== Early life ==
Graham Barham was born on October 13, 1998, in Oak Ridge, Louisiana. He began singing in church at a young age, and contributed his family and most significantly his grandmother, as the first to instill the value of music in him. Barham describes church as the place that he began writing his own music after leading worship hymns.

== Career ==
=== 2022–2023: Early career and North of Hell ===
Barham moved from Louisiana to Nashville, Tennessee, and began to write for other artists. In 2022, he wrote his breakout single "Preachers Need People" which went viral on social media. Barham then signed a distribution deal with Virgin Records. In May 2023, Barham signed a global publishing deal with Cornman Music and Warner Chappell Music. On December 9, 2022, Barham released the second song from his upcoming debut EP, "Break it in a Bar". On July 14, 2023, Barham released his debut EP, North of Hell, containing six tracks, including the previously released "Preachers Need People", "Break it in a Bar", and "Beer By My Bed", the latter of which was released in February of that year.

=== 2024–2025: Oil Money and Whiskey Rain ===
In early 2024, Barham announced he was signing with Sony Music Nashville and Disruptor Records, simultaneously releasing his debut song for the label, "Lights On Nobody's Home".. Barham wrote and provided backup vocals on "Devil You Know", the breakout hit for Tyler Braden, released in February 2024.

On June 7, 2024, Barham released "Whiskey Whiskey" to streaming services. The song was a streaming hit, garnering over 28 million streams as of September 16, 2025. Around this time, Barham started leaning heavily into promoting his music via social media. In February 2025, Barham released "Oil Money", as the title track to his EP of the same title. The song went viral on social media for kick-starting a genre Barham dubbed as "club country". The song, based on Taylor Sheridan's series Landman, gained half a million streams on Spotify in its first 24 hours, and the EP reached No. 1 on the Country iTunes chart. "Oil Money" would become Barham's debut entry to the Billboard Hot Country Songs chart, peaking at number 40 on the chart.

On March 28, 2025, Barham released "Camo" alongside a music video which was used in promotional content. In May 2025, Barham followed with "WTH Just Happened?", a classic country sounding track at first, but abruptly transitioning into an intense trap chorus. In May 2025, Blake Shelton released his thirteenth studio album For Recreational Use Only, containing the album's second official radio single, "Stay Country or Die Tryin'" which was co-written by Barham. On June 20, 2025, Barham released "Easy on Me", after being heavily teased. Similar to Sydney Thomas being featured in the "Oil Money" teasers, Sydney Smith was featured in the "Easy on Me" teasers. In early July 2025, Barham started teasing more songs from the EP, including his next single "Bad Night (Karma)", which was released on July 25. Throughout August 2025, Barham started teasing more songs from his upcoming EP, including "Whiskey Rain", "Break Out the Bottle", "Everybody Dies in Hollywood", and "Speaking My Mind". It was announced that Tyler Hubbard, half of country duo Florida Georgia Line, was to be featured on "Whiskey Rain", the title track for Barham's upcoming third extended play of the same name and Hubbard's first country collab since Florida Georgia Line. Hubbard marks just the second feature on any of Barham's songs. Whiskey Rain was released on September 5, 2025. The EP contained all the previously released and teased songs, excluding "Speaking My Mind", which didn't make the EP cut. In September 2025, Barham embarked on his debut headlining tour, the Oil Money Tour.

In October 2025, Barham began teasing an upcoming song, "Buckshot", on his social media. Barham also teased another upcoming song "Dixie Chicks", before releasing "Buckshot" on November 7, 2025.

=== 2026–present: Club Country ===
On February 13, 2026, Barham released "Country Music", the first promotional single off of his upcoming project. Barham previously teased this song on his social media accounts. Following the release of "Country Music", Barham began teasing a new song, interpolating Jay Sean's "Down". The song was revealed to be titled "Breakup (Down)" and would be Barham's debut radio single and the first official single from his upcoming debut studio album. It was released on March 27. On April 30, 2026, Barham announced his debut studio album, Club Country, to be released on June 12, 2026, alongside "I'm the One", a song previously teased on Barham's social media. The album's tracklist was revealed alongside the announcement, containing the two viral EP title tracks, “Oil Money” and “Whiskey Rain”, with several previously teased songs also making the cut, such as "Speaking My Mind", "Dixie Chicks", and "So Long Saturday Night".

== Discography ==
=== Studio albums ===
List of studio albums, with selected details
Title	Album details
Club Country	Scheduled date: June 12, 2026; Label: Disruptor Records; Formats: Streaming, digital download

=== Extended plays ===
List of extended plays, with selected details
Title	EP details
North of Hell	Release date: July 14, 2023; Label: Virgin Records; Formats: Streaming, digital download
Oil Money	Release date: February 14, 2025; Label: Disruptor Records; Formats: Streaming, digital download
Whiskey Rain	Release date: September 5, 2025; Label: Disruptor Records; Formats: Streaming, digital download

=== Singles ===
List of singles, with selected chart positions
Title	Year	Peak chart positions	Certifications	Album
Title	Year	US Country	Certifications	Album
"Oil Money"	2025	40	RIAA: Gold	Oil Money
"Breakup (Down)"	2026	—		Club Country

=== Promotional singles ===
List of promotional singles, with selected chart positions
Title	Year	Album
"Preachers Need People"	2022	North of Hell
"Break it in a Bar"	2023	North of Hell
"Beer by My Bed"	2023	North of Hell
"Lights on Nobody's Home"	2024	Non-album single
"Bayou Boy"	2024	Non-album single
"Whiskey Whiskey"	2024	Oil Money
"M.I.A."	2024	Oil Money
"Camo"	2025	Whiskey Rain
"WTH Just Happened?"	2025	Whiskey Rain
"Easy on Me"	2025	Whiskey Rain
"Bad Night (Karma)"	2025	Whiskey Rain
"Whiskey Rain" (featuring Tyler Hubbard)	2025	Whiskey Rain
"Buckshot"	2025	Non-album single
"Country Music"	2025	Club Country
"I’m the One"	2025	Club Country

=== Music videos ===
Year	Video	Director
2023	"Beer by My Bed"	
2023	"North of Hell"	Jesse DeFlorio
2024	"Bayou Boy"	
2024	"You Won't Let Me Stay"	
2025	"Camo"	
2025	"Whiskey Rain" (featuring Tyler Hubbard)	

=== Writing credits ===
- "Wanna Be Saved" - Austin Williams (2023)
- "Milwaukee" - Wyatt Flores (2024)
- "Broken Branches" - Dierks Bentley (2025)
- "Stay Country or Die Tryin'" - Blake Shelton (2025)
