= Will Your Anchor Hold =

1882 Christian hymn

- Hymn
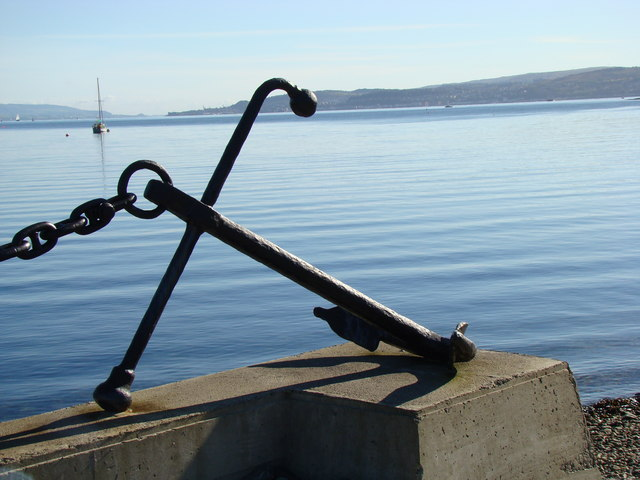
- Text: by Priscilla Jane Owens
- Melody: "Anchor" by William J. Kirkpatrick
- Published: 1882

"Will Your Anchor Hold" (sometimes titled "We Have an Anchor") is a Christian hymn, written in 1882 by Priscilla Jane Owens in the United States.

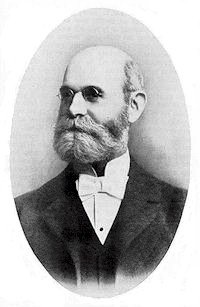
William J. Kirkpatrick

== History ==
Priscilla Owens (1829–1907) was a Sunday school teacher at the Union Square Methodist Episcopal Church in Baltimore, Maryland. She wrote a number of hymns and songs for her pupils; this is the best known today. The music was written by William J. Kirkpatrick (1838–1921) of Philadelphia, Pennsylvania. He was a member of the same Christian denomination, Methodist Episcopal Church as Owens, and was a prolific writer of hymn tunes and compiler of hymn collections. The hymn has always been closely associated with the Boys' Brigade founded by Sir William Alexander Smith, which has the motto, "Sure and Steadfast". It is the official hymn of Dollar Academy, an independent day and boarding school in Scotland, where it is known as the "Dollar Anthem".

== Words ==
The words were inspired by the Epistle to the Hebrews, Chapter 6, Verse 19; "Which hope we have as an anchor of the soul, both sure and steadfast...", although other Biblical texts are also referenced in the verses of the hymn.

First of five verses:
Will your anchor hold in the storms of life,
When the clouds unfold their wings of strife?
When the strong tides lift and the cables strain,
Will your anchor drift, or firm remain?

Refrain:
We have an anchor that keeps the soul
Steadfast and sure while the billows roll,
Fastened to the Rock which cannot move,
Grounded firm and deep in the Saviour's love.
