= Beulah (land) =

Land referred to in the Biblical Book of Isaiah

Beulah (Hebrew: בְּעוּלָה, romanized: bə‘ulā) means "married" and is applied to the land the Israelites will obtain.

The land of Beulah is referred to in various hymns and other works.

== Bible ==
The only known ancient reference to a land called Beulah is in Isaiah 62:4. In Biblical Hebrew, Beulah means "married", and is applied to the land that the people of Israel will marry:

... but thou shalt be called Hephzibah,
and thy land Beulah;
for the LORD delighteth in thee,
and thy land shall be married.
For as a young man marrieth a virgin... (King James Version)

Hephzibah means "my delight is in her". Beulah has also been translated as "inhabited", for example by Rashi.

All later references to the land of Beulah are derivative of this one mention in the Bible.

== Pilgrim's Progress ==
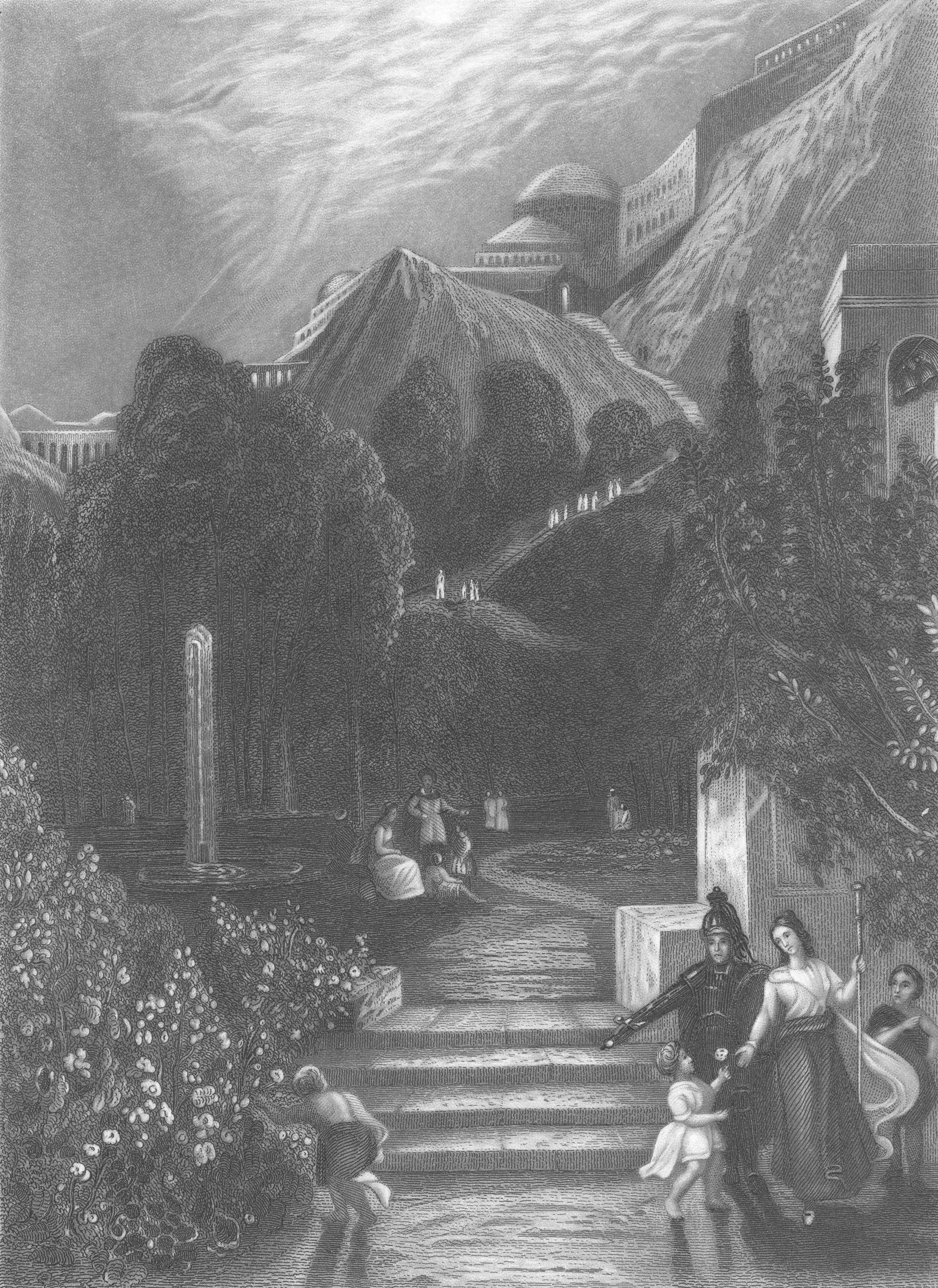
"The Land of Beulah", by Harden Sidney Melville, based on Pilgrim's Progress.

In the Christian allegory Pilgrim's Progress (1678) by John Bunyan, Beulah Land is a place of peace near the end of the Christian life, on the border of the Celestial City. The River of Death separates Beulah from the New Jerusalem, the city on a hill.

Now I saw in my dream, that by this time the pilgrims were got over the Enchanted Ground, and entering into the country of Beulah, whose air was very sweet and pleasant, the way lying directly through it, they solaced themselves there for a season. Yea, here they heard continually the singing of birds, and saw every day the flowers appear in the earth, and heard the voice of the turtle [dove] in the land. In this country the sun shineth night and day: wherefore this was beyond the Valley of the Shadow of Death, and also out of the reach of Giant Despair; neither could they from this place so much as see Doubting Castle. Here they were within sight of the city they were going to...

== Music ==
=== Hymns ===
There are several relatively well-known hymns on the land of Beulah, whose similar titles can lead to confusion.

- Beulah Land, 1876, lyrics by Edgar Page Stites (1836–1921) and music by John R. Sweney. First line: "I've reached the land of corn [grain] and wine". In this hymn, several themes from The Pilgrim's Progress are developed. The song talks about today's Christian life as one that border Heaven and from where one can almost see Heaven. It speaks of a place of victory and fellowship with God.

Stites explained the hymn's origins:

It was in 1876 that I wrote "Beulah Land". I could write only two verses and the chorus, when I was overcome and fell on my face. That was one Sunday. On the following Sunday I wrote the third and fourth verses, and again I was so influenced by emotion that I could only pray and weep. The first time it was sung was at the regular Monday morning meeting of Methodists in Philadelphia. Bishop McCabe sang it to the assembled ministers. Since then it is known wherever religious people congregate. I have never received a cent for my songs. Perhaps that is why they have had such a wide popularity. I could not do work for the Master and receive pay for it.

- Is Not This the Land of Beulah?, 1882, lyrics by either Harriet W. R. Qua or William Hunter, music by John W. Dadmun, recorded by The Isaacs and other groups. First line: "I am dwelling on the mountain".

There is some uncertainty about the origins of "Is Not This the Land of Beulah." Public domain records show it attributed to William Hunter, somewhere before 1884, yet other records credit William B. Bradbury with the modern arrangement being attributed to John W. Dadman in 1911.

- I Have Entered Beulah Land, 1886, words by Fanny Crosby, music by John Robson Sweney. First line: "Oh my cup is overflowing".
- The Sweet Beulah Land, 1891, words by Rev. H. J. Zelley, music by H. L. Gilmour. First line: "I am walking today in the sweet Beulah land".
- Dwelling in Beulah Land, 1911, by Charles Austen Miles. First line: "Far away the noise of strife upon my ear is falling".
- Sweet Beulah Land, 1979, by Squire Parsons (1948–2025). First line: "I'm kind of homesick for a country".

=== Other songs ===
Blues musician Mississippi John Hurt recorded a song for the Library of Congress in 1963, which was entitled "Beulah Land." First line: "I've got a mother in Beulah land".

UK Blues musician Ian Siegal recorded a song called "Beulah Land" on his album The Picnic Sessions. First line: "Riders of the purple sage".

Alternative piano artist Tori Amos wrote a song also entitled "Beulah Land", which was a B-side on her 1998 album From the Choirgirl Hotel. Dennis Brown mentions it in the song deliverance the destiny beulaland instead of Babylon

=== Mentions in music ===
Composer Charles Ives used the 1876 hymn tune "Beulah Land" in his String Quartet No. 1 (1896), entitled "Salvation Army", and the second movement of his 4th Symphony.

In the final moments of the opera The Ballad of Baby Doe, by Douglas Moore, the title character, referring to her husband, sings "In the circle of his arms I am safe in Beulah Land."

The Tom Waits song, "Take Care Of All My Children," includes the line "I'll be goin' up to Beulah Land."

The Vigilantes of Love song "Earth Has No Sorrow" from the album Killing Floor, includes the line "I hear angels 'cross that river in Beulah land".

Songwriter Drew Nelson won international acclaim with the 2009 album "Dusty Road to Beulah Land", produced by Michael Crittenden of Mackinaw Harvest Music. The album has been described as "a love song to the state of Michigan." Local community radio station WYCE in Grand Rapids, Michigan, honored it as the "Best Local Album" at the 2010 Jammie Awards.

Mahalia Jackson says that she will go “out sightseeing in Beulah” in her 1947 Gospel hit “I Will Move On Up A Little Higher”.

== Books ==
- Modern author Krista McGruder, a native of the Ozarks, entitled her 2003 collection of short stories "Beulah Land". The final story in the collection is also titled "Beulah Land".
- Mary Lee Settle, National Book Award winner for Blood Ties, (Houghton Mifflin 1977), wrote a series of novels called the Beulah Quintet. O Beulah Land (Viking, 1956; Scribner Signature Edition, 1987; University of South Carolina Press, 1996) is Volume II in the series.
- Oregonian novelist H. L. Davis, best known for his 1935 Pulitzer Prize–winning Honey in the Horn, wrote a 1949 novel called Beulah Land about the travails and westward travels of a Cherokee family from the Southeastern United States.
- Lonnie Coleman wrote the Beulah Land trilogy of novels about a plantation with this name: Beulah Land (1973), Look Away, Beulah Land (1977), and Legacy of Beulah Land (1981). The first two were adapted into a 1980 miniseries.
- Sweet Beulah Land is a 1999 novel by North Carolina writer Bernice Kelly Harris.
- Fire in Beulah is a 2001 novel by Rilla Askew.
- In Jane Eyre, Chapter XV, the title character, having saved Mr. Rochester from the fire in his bedroom, returns to her own bed but does not go to sleep. “Till morning dawned I was tossed on a buoyant but unquiet sea, where billows of trouble rolled under surges of joy. I thought sometimes I saw beyond its wild waters a shore, sweet as the hills of Beulah; and now and then a freshening gale, wakened by hope, bore my spirit triumphantly towards the bourne: but I could not reach it, even in fancy ….”
- In Samantha at Saratoga by Marietta Holley, Beulah is compared with Saratoga Springs, New York by Josiah Allen and Samantha.

== Places ==
- Welsh immigrants founded Beulah, Pennsylvania, in 1796. It is today a ghost town (see Ghost Town Trail).
- Beulah Land Baptist Church is in Yazoo City, Mississippi.
- Beulahland, Virginia, is an unincorporated community in King and Queen County, Virginia.
- Beulah, Victoria, Australia
- Beulah Park, South Australia, Australia
- Beulah Park, Ohio
- Beulah, Michigan
- Beulah, North Dakota
- Beulah, Wales

== See also ==
- Zion
