= Stay Country or Die Tryin' =

2025 single by Blake Shelton

Single by Blake Shelton

from the album For Recreational Use Only
- Released: May 19, 2025
- Genre: Country
- Length: 3:41
- Label: Wheelhouse
- Songwriters: Beau Bailey; Graham Barham; Sam Ellis; Drew Parker
- Producer: Scott Hendricks

Blake Shelton singles chronology
"Texas" (2024)	"Stay Country or Die Tryin'" (2025)	"New Country" (2025)

Music video
- "Stay Country or Die Tryin'" on YouTube

"Stay Country or Die Tryin'" is a song by American country music singer Blake Shelton. It was sent to country radio on May 19, 2025, as the second commercial single from his thirteenth studio album, For Recreational Use Only (2025). It was written by Beau Bailey, Graham Barham, Sam Ellis and Drew Parker, and produced by Scott Hendricks.

== Background ==
Shelton stated that when he heard the song, it reminded him of the first time he heard other songs of his such as "Ol' Red" and "God's Country", due to its high energy and many expressions relevant to rural life. In an interview with American Songwriter, Shelton described the song as a mix of the two aforementioned songs and explained:

The lyric is just a bunch of almost phrases and things that are picturesque to growing up in the kind of backwoods and country, and that diehard mentality. It's, "I know where I come from." That's kind of how we are — a little very prideful, a little bit stubborn. And that's kind of the guy in that song. There's a pride to being a hillbilly and not going to town for any-damn-thing. You know what I mean?

== Composition ==
The song contains "roaring" guitars, and the sound of a quail is played in the beginning. In the lyrics, Shelton celebrates his country roots, describing his lifestyle such as working hard without guarantees of financial success and devotion to his parents. He references many symbols of rural culture, including the Bible, American flag, barns and rednecks.

== Critical reception ==
Neil Z. Yeung of AllMusic regarded the song as a highlight of For Recreational Use Only and "begging for beer-soaked celebration." Alli Patton of Holler wrote of the song, "While more bogged down in rural buzzwords this time around, the blazing tune is not unlike his insipid hit, 'Boys 'Round Here', from 2013 and 2019's prideful anthem 'God's Country'."

== Music video ==
The music video for "Stay Country or Die Tryin'" was directed by Adam Rothlein and Jennifer Ansell and was released on June 27, 2025. The video uses AI as a tribute to country life and land.

== Commercial performance ==
"Stay Country or Die Tryin'" reached number one on the Billboard Country Airplay chart dated January 17, 2026, becoming Shelton's thirtieth number one single on that chart, his first since "Pour Me a Drink" in October 2024, and his first as a solo artist since "God's Country" in July 2019. Furthermore, this accomplishment made Shelton the artist with the second most number ones on the chart.

== Track listing ==
Digital EP

1. "Stay Country or Die Tryin'" (single version) – 3:41
2. "Texas" – 2:49
3. "Cold Can" – 3:06
4. "Heaven Sweet Home" (featuring Craig Morgan) – 3:41

== Personnel ==
Credits adapted from Tidal.

=== Musicians ===
- Blake Shelton – lead vocals
- Nir Z – drums, tambourine
- Troy Lancaster – electric guitar
- Tom Bukovac – electric guitar
- Gordon Mote – piano, Hammond B3 organ
- Sam Bergeson – electric guitar, programming; slide guitar, additional guitar
- Jimmie Lee Sloas – bass
- Bryan Sutton – acoustic guitar, mandolin
- Perry Coleman – backing vocals
- Justin Niebank – programming
- Aubrey Haynie – fiddle
- Drew Parker – backing vocals

=== Technical ===
- Scott Hendricks – production, engineering
- Andrew Mendelson – mastering
- Justin Niebank – mixing, engineering
- Brian David Willis – engineering, editing
- Sam Bergeson – engineering, additional mixing
- Sam Ellis – engineering

== Charts ==
Chart performance for "Stay Country or Die Tryin'"
Chart (2025–2026)	Peak position
Canada Hot 100 (Billboard)	96
Canada Country (Billboard)	4
US Billboard Hot 100	63
US Country Airplay (Billboard)	1
US Hot Country Songs (Billboard)	22
