= Oil Money (song) =

Song by Graham Barham

from the album Club Country
- Released: February 14, 2025
- Genre: Country pop; trap
- Length: 2:58
- Label: Sony Music Entertainment; Disruptor Records
- Songwriters: Graham Barham; Beau Bailey; Sam Bergeson; Cole Miracle

"Oil Money" is a song by American country pop singer-songwriter Graham Barham, released on February 14, 2025, from his debut album, Club Country. The song peaked at number 40 on the US Billboard Hot Country Songs chart, becoming Barham's debut song on the chart.

== Lyrics and composition ==
"Oil Money" is a pop-heavy song using a metaphor to describe an attractive woman with a body like "oil money". Barham said the song came about after watching Taylor Sheridan's series Landman. The first verse describes the meeting of the woman, with the pre-chorus saying she was "Coppertone from head to Tony Lama", a reference to Coppertone sunscreen and Tony Lama footwear. In the chorus, Barham relates the woman's looks to "oil money", due to the way she moves, saying he's a "rich man with his hands on that body like oil money". Barham also references "club country", the genre he has dubbed his own music. The second verse says the woman doesn't need fancy things to look nice, such as Louis Vuitton or fancy jewelry or cars, saying she'd look "bougie" with a Bottomland hoodie on, relating her beauty to that of the Stagecoach or Coachella music festivals.

== Commercial performance ==
"Oil Money" went viral on social media, particularly TikTok. The song was highly controversial among country music fans, due to the mix of country songwriting with hip hop production and innuendos. It peaked at number 40 on the Hot Country Songs chart, remaining on the chart for 11 weeks, the debut chart performance for Barham.

== Charts ==
Chart performance for "Oil Money"
Chart (2025)	Peak position
US Hot Country Songs (Billboard)	40

== Certifications ==
Region	Certification	Certified units/sales
United States (RIAA)	Gold	500,000^{‡}
^{‡} Sales+streaming figures based on certification alone.
