= Hymns and Songs of Inspiration =

Studio album by Gordon Mote
- Released: October 23, 2015
- Genre: Gospel
- Label: New Haven

Gordon Mote chronology
All Things New (2013)	Hymns and Songs of Inspiration (2015)

Hymns and Songs of Inspiration is an album by Gordon Mote. It earned Mote a Grammy Award nomination for Best Roots Gospel Album in 2017.

== Track listing ==
1. "Holy Spirit"
2. "Amazing Grace"
3. "O, the Blood"
4. "'Tis So Sweet"
5. "When We All Get to Heaven"
6. "I Surrender All"
7. "Precious Lord, Take My Hand"
8. "Because He Lives (Amen)"
9. "Great Is Thy Faithfulness"
10. "Just a Closer Walk with Thee"
11. "Power in the Blood"
12. "Only Jesus Can Heal This Hurting World"
13. "Just as I Am"
