= Texas (Blake Shelton song) =

2024 single by Blake Shelton

Single by Blake Shelton

from the album For Recreational Use Only
- Released: November 15, 2024
- Genre: Country
- Length: 2:50
- Label: Wheelhouse
- Songwriters: Johnny Clawson; Josh Dorr; Kyle Sturrock; Lalo Guzman
- Producer: Scott Hendricks

Blake Shelton singles chronology
"Pour Me a Drink" (2024)	"Texas" (2024)	"Stay Country or Die Tryin'" (2025)

Music video
- "Texas" on YouTube

"Texas" is a song by American country music singer Blake Shelton. It was released on November 15, 2024, as the lead single from his thirteenth studio album, For Recreational Use Only. It was written by Johnny Clawson, Josh Dorr, Kyle Sturrock and Lalo Guzman and produced by Scott Hendricks. The song peaked at number 61 on the Billboard Hot 100 and reached number 2 on the Country Airplay chart.

== Background ==
Blake Shelton was inspired to write the song by the music of country singer Ronnie Milsap. In an interview with American Songwriter, he said "It kind of walks a line that's a little bit of a 'Stranger in My House' or something like that. It's kind of got this haunting thing about it, but you can also jam out and rock out to it at the same time." He went on to reveal that "When I went in and played three or four things for BMG, they're the ones that went, 'Oh my God, this song.' Then as I went around and played it for other friends and family and people that I work with. It was unanimous every time I played it for people. They were like, 'Play that again.'" One man also demanded to hear 'Texas' three times in a row before letting Shelton leave the meeting. In regard to his own opinions, Shelton stated:

It was exactly what I was praying for throughout this process. I am to the point in my career where I've started to think people maybe a lot of times we're going to wait to see what I say first. I feel like I want to make a big swing at this thing this time, and I hope that it's as right as it can be. We didn’t even have to have those conversations with "Texas." It was just, "Oh my God, we're doing this." I knew I loved the song, but I don't record songs that I don't love. So that was the easy part to, know that I loved it. I needed to know what other people thought about it before I was willing to say, "Let's come with it first." I haven’t done this in a long time, and I wanted it to have an impact.

Shelton has stated, "The thing that struck me about 'Texas' immediately was how different it sounded for me, and I'm always looking to push myself. I think there's something really special about this record and it feels important to me. This is the perfect opportunity to come back with something so different, and it easily felt like it should be the first single. It's connected with what I've done but moves forward at the same time, and it's the perfect start to the next chapter of my career." A press release described the song "captures the classic theme of lost love with a twist and nod to George Strait."

== Content ==
The song is about a man who is left by a free-spirited woman and wonders about her whereabouts. When he is at the bar, people constantly ask about her. He eventually speculates she is in Texas. In the chorus, Shelton references George Strait's song "All My Ex's Live in Texas": "She's probably in Texas / Amarillo, all I know / George Strait said it / Yeah, that's where all them exes go / If she ain't with me out here in Tennessee / Then I don't know where she's headed / If I'm guessin', I reckon / She's probably in Texas".

== Music video ==
The music video was released alongside the single. Directed by Ada Rothlein and Jennifer Ansell, it features actress Genesis Rodriguez, who plays Blake Shelton's ex-girlfriend. She is seen driving down wide open roads in her convertible. Meanwhile, Shelton thinks of her as he is sitting in a bar. At the end of the clip, she buries a suitcase with a tracker to elude him.

== Live performances ==
Blake Shelton performed the song on Jimmy Kimmel Live! on November 20, 2024.

== Charts ==
=== Weekly charts ===
Weekly chart performance for "Texas"
Chart (2024–2025)	Peak position
Canada Hot 100 (Billboard)	69
Canada All-Format Airplay (Billboard)	7
Canada Country (Billboard)	1
US Billboard Hot 100	61
US Country Airplay (Billboard)	2
US Hot Country Songs (Billboard)	16

=== Year-end charts ===
Year-end chart performance for "Texas"
Chart (2025)	Position
US Country Airplay (Billboard)	22
US Hot Country Songs (Billboard)	46

== Certifications ==
Certifications for "Texas"
Region	Certification	Certified units/sales
Canada (Music Canada)	Gold	40,000^{‡}
^{‡} Sales+streaming figures based on certification alone.
