= Beulahland, Virginia =

Unincorporated community in Virginia, United States

- Unincorporated community
- Location in Virginia, United States Beulahland (the United States)
- Coordinates: 37°32′56″N 76°40′59″W
- Country: United States
- State: Virginia
- County: King and Queen County

Beulahland is an unincorporated community in King and Queen County, Virginia, United States.
