= Jan Swafford =

American author and composer (born 1946)

Jan Swafford (born September 10, 1946) is an American author and composer. He earned his Bachelor of Arts magna cum laude from Harvard College and his M.M.A. and D.M.A. from the Yale School of Music. His teachers included Earl Kim at Harvard, Jacob Druckman at Yale, and Betsy Jolas at Tanglewood. He has written respected musical biographies of Charles Ives, Johannes Brahms, Ludwig van Beethoven, and Wolfgang Amadeus Mozart as well as the Vintage Guide to Classical Music and the introduction to music "Language of the Spirit." His books are widely translated, including editions in Spanish, Chinese, Italian, and Portuguese. He appeared in the award-winning 2018 German documentary The Unanswered Ives.

== Works ==
Swafford has written columns on music and other subjects in Slate, and is heard as a commentator on NPR and the BBC. He is a regular program annotator for orchestras and venues including the Boston Symphony, Cleveland Orchestra, Chicago Symphony, San Francisco Symphony, the Metropolitan Opera, and Carnegie Hall. He provided liner notes for two DGG collections of the complete Beethoven symphonies.

His writing honors include a 2012 Deems Taylor Award for internet writing, a Mellon Fellowship at Harvard, and an honorary Harvard Phi Beta Kappa. His Brahms and Ives biographies were end-of-year Critics' Choices in The New York Times. The Ives biography was nominated for a National Book Critics Circle award in biography and won the Pen-Winship prize for a book on a New England subject. His biography Beethoven: Anguish and Triumph in its first week appeared on the New York Times bestseller list.

He has taught at schools including Boston University, Amherst College, Tufts, and Boston Conservatory.

Swafford's music, which is highly lyrical and moves freely between tonality and atonality, has been called New Romantic in style. There are equal if less overt contributions from world music, especially Indian and Balinese, and from jazz and blues. The titles of his works reveal a steady inspiration from nature and landscape. The composer views his own work as a kind of classicism: a concern with clarity, directness, and expression, or as he puts it, "music that sounds familiar though it is new, works that sound like they wrote themselves."

Notable are his orchestral works Landscape with Traveler (1979–80), After Spring Rain (1981–82) From the Shadow of the Mountain, (2001), and "Late August," the piano quintet Midsummer Variations (1985), the piano quartet They Who Hunger (1989), and the piano trio They That Mourn (2002), the last in memoriam 9/11. In 2012 cellist Rhonda Rider premiered his solo cello work The Silence at Yuma Point, part of a commissioning project of pieces inspired by the Grand Canyon (where Swafford has been a frequent hiker). In 2024 Orchestra New England premiered his "Late Autumn - First Snow." His recordings include "They Who Hunger" by the Scott Chamber players and the solo piano work "Music Like Steel and Like Fire" by pianist Adam Golka.

His compositional awards include a National Endowment for the Arts Composer Grant, two Massachusetts Artists Foundation Fellowships, and a Tanglewood Fellowship. His work is published by Peermusic Classical and Meridian Records.

== Awards and honors ==
- 1997 L.L. Winship/PEN New England Award, Charles Ives: A Life With Music

== Bibliography ==
- Swafford, Jan (1992). The Vintage Guide to Classical Music. New York: Vintage Books. ISBN 978-0-679-72805-4.
- Swafford, Jan (1998). Charles Ives: A Life with Music. New York: W. W. Norton & Company. ISBN 978-0-393-31719-0.
- Swafford, Jan (1999). Johannes Brahms: A Biography. New York: Vintage Books. ISBN 978-0-679-74582-2.
- Swafford, Jan (2014). Beethoven: Anguish and Triumph. Boston: Houghton Mifflin Harcourt. ISBN 978-0-618-05474-9.
- Swafford, Jan (2017). Language of the Spirit: An Introduction to Classical Music. New York: Basic Books. ISBN 978-0-465-09754-8.
- Swafford, Jan (2020). Mozart: The Reign of Love. New York: Harper. ISBN 978-0-062-43357-2.
