= William J. Kirkpatrick =

American hymnwriter (1838–1921)

William James Kirkpatrick
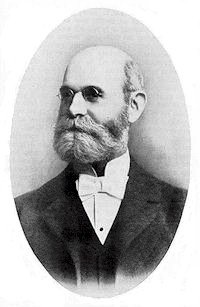
- Born: 27 February 1838; Duncannon, Pennsylvania, U.S.
- Died: 20 September 1921 (aged 83)
- Burial place: West Laurel Hill Cemetery, Bala Cynwyd, Pennsylvania, U.S.
- Occupation: Hymnwriter

William James Kirkpatrick (February 27, 1838 – September 20, 1921) was an American hymnwriter and music publisher. He produced and published 91 books of hymns, over half of them in partnership with John R. Sweney. He co-founded Praise Publishing Company in 1878 along with Sweney and served as president.

== Early life ==
Kirkpatrick was born February 27, 1838, in Duncannon, Pennsylvania, to Thompson and Elizabeth Kirkpatrick. He received formal music training and the family's love for music inspired him to a career in music. He learned to play the fife, flute, violin, and violincello.

In 1854, he moved to Philadelphia to study music and carpentry as a back-up profession. He was a student of Professor T. Bishop for vocal music and joined the Harmonia and Handel and Haydn Sacred Music Societies. In 1855, he became involved in the Wharton Street Methodist Episcopal Church where he sang in the choir and taught Sunday school. He studied sacred music under Dr. Leopold Meignen, the conductor of the Harmonia Society.

== Career ==
In 1858, Kirkpatrick worked with A.S. Jenks who helped him publish his first collection of hymns, Devotional Melodies, in 1859.

During the American Civil War, he joined the 91st Pennsylvania Infantry Regiment under Colonel Edgar M. Gregory as principal musician (also known as fife major). He remained with the regiment, mostly stationed near Washington, D.C., and Alexandria, Virginia, until 1862, when the position was abolished by general orders.

In 1865, the Ebenezer Methodist Episcopal Church chose Kirkpatrick as organist and lead for all music. He worked as a furniture maker from 1866 to 1876 as a second job to earn extra money. His first popular gospel songs were published between 1872 and 1875. It was around this time he met John R. Sweney who would become his partner in music. In 1878, he quit the furniture making business and devoted himself full time to hymnwriting.

The Quiver of Sacred Song - published by Kirkpatrick and John R. Sweney in 1880

Between 1880 and 1897, Kirkpatrick and Sweney published 49 books of hymns through eight different publishers. From 1886 to 1897, Kirkpatrick was given control over all of the music at Grace Methodist Episcopal church. After the death of Sweney in 1899, Kirkpatrick went on to publish 42 books of hymns.

He co-founded Praise Publishing Company along with Sweney in 1878 and served as president. Kirkpatrick and Sweney published almost 1,000 of the hymns written by Fanny Crosby.

Kirkpatrick died from a heart attack on September 20, 1921, at his home in the Germantown neighborhood of Philadelphia. He was interred at West Laurel Hill Cemetery in Bala Cynwyd, Pennsylvania.

== Personal life ==
He was married in 1861 but she died in 1878. He was married a second time in 1893 to Sara Kellogg Bourne.

== Contribution to hymnody ==
Among the many hymns that he contributed to, these are some of the most notable

1. “A Wonderful Savior is Jesus My Lord”
2. “Away in a Manger”
3. “I am Not Skilled to Understand”
4. “Jesus Saves! (We Have Heard the Joyful Sound)”
5. “Lead Me to Calvary”
6. “My Faith has Found a Resting Place”
7. “'Tis So Sweet to Trust in Jesus”
8. “Blessed Be The Name”
9. “Halleluiah! Amen!”
10. “The Comforter Has Come”
11. “Will Your Anchor Hold”
12. “Give Me Thy Heart”
13. “Lord, I'm Coming Home”
14. “Redeemed”
15. “His Grace Aboundeth More”
16. “Singing I Go”
17. “O To Be Like Thee”
18. “We Have an Anchor”
19. “Stepping in the Light”
20. "The Lord is in His Holy Temple"
