= John R. Sweney =

American gospel composer (1837–1899)

John Robson Sweney
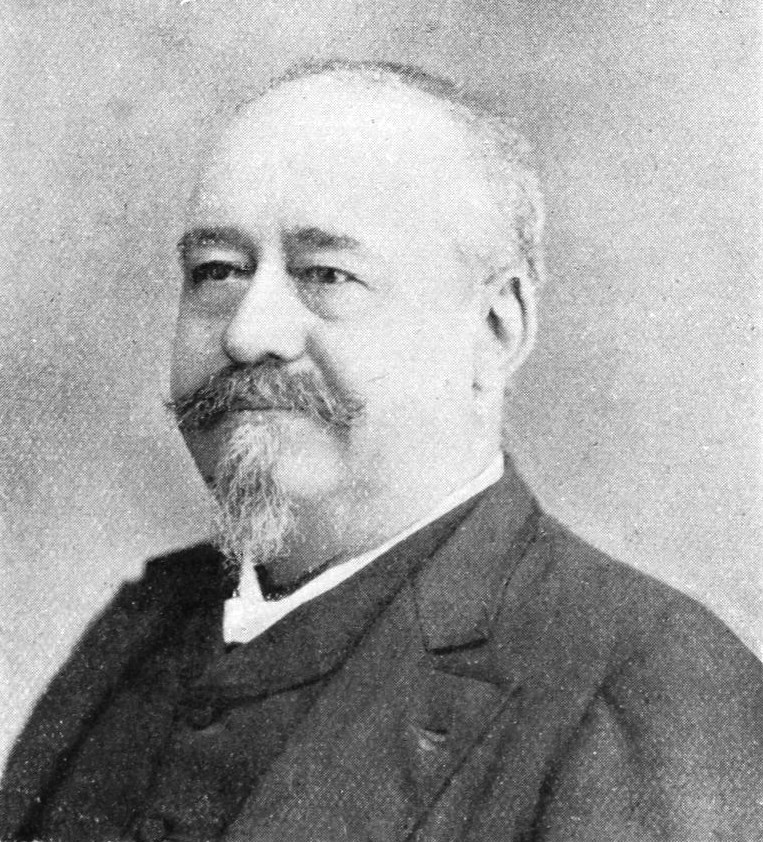
- Born: December 31, 1837; West Chester, Pennsylvania, U.S.
- Died: April 10, 1899 (aged 61)
- Resting place: Chester Rural Cemetery, Chester, Pennsylvania, U.S.
- Education: Pennsylvania Military Academy (BA)
- Occupations: Professor of music, composer

John Robson Sweney (December 31, 1837 – April 10, 1899) was an American composer from Pennsylvania. He was a professor of music at the Pennsylvania Military Academy for twenty-five years and collaborated with William J. Kirkpatrick to produce and publish over 1,000 gospel hymn songs and over sixty hymnal books. His most popular and widely known hymn is "Beulah Land".

== Early life and education ==
He was born in West Chester, Pennsylvania, and showed indications of musical ability at an early age. As a child he began to teach music in the public school and to lead and compose music in his Sunday school. At the age of nineteen he studied music under Professor Theodore Bauer, a celebrated German teacher, and Professor Barilli. He took lessons on the violin and piano. He worked as a leader of a choir, at children's concerts and entertainments, and as the conductor of a glee club.

He received a BA degree in Music in 1876 and a Doctor of Music degree in 1886 from the Pennsylvania Military Academy.

== Career ==
The Quiver of Sacred Song - published by Sweney and William J. Kirkpatrick in 1880

At the age of twenty-two he worked as a teacher in Dover, Delaware. When the Civil War broke out, he took charge of the band of the Third Delaware Regiment, and continued until bands were disbanded by the government. After returning from the war he was appointed Professor of Music at the Pennsylvania Military Academy, then located at West Chester. Previous to this time he had written several pieces for the piano, which were published. When the Pennsylvania Military Academy was relocated to its present location in Chester, Pennsylvania, he remained in West Chester and continued teaching and leading "Sweney's Cornet Band" which became locally successful.

About 1869 he was recalled to the Pennsylvania Military Academy, and moved to Chester, where he was professor of music in that institution for twenty-five years.

In 1876 the academy conferred on him the degree of Bachelor of Music, and in 1886 the degree of Doctor of Music. In 1871, having connected himself with the church in Chester, he began the composition of sacred music, and soon became widely known, and was in great demand as a music leader of large congregations.

For many years he led the assemblies at the well-known summer meetings at Ocean Grove, New Jersey. He also the lead for music at Lake Bluif, near Chicago; at New Albany, Indiana.; Old Orchard, Maine; and Round Lake, New York.; Thousand Islands, and many other places. It was a common saying among evangelists that " Sweney knows how to make a congregation sing."

For ten years or more he had charge of the music at Bethany Presbyterian Church and Sunday-school in Philadelphia, of which school John Wanamaker was superintendent—one of the largest Sunday-schools in the United States.

Sweney wrote over one thousand sacred songs. Among his most popular ones are : "In the Morning," "Light after Darkness," "Sunshine in the Soul," "More about Jesus," "Tell Me How," "Oh, 'tis Glory," "The New Song" and "I Will Shout His Praise in Glory". His most popular and widely known hymn is "Beulah Land"

His first Sunday-school book, the "Gems of Praise," was issued in annual numbers beginning in 1871 and finished in 1876. He was then associated largely with William J. Kirkpatrick in issuing the following books: "The Garner," "The Quiver," "The Ark of Praise," "Songs of Redeeming Love—Nos. 1 and 2," "Joy to the World," "Wells of Salvation," "Gospel Chorus" (male voices), "Our Sabbath Home," "Melodious Sonnets," "Joyful Sound," "On Joyful Wing," "Precious Hymns," "Quartette," "Trio," "Temple Trio," "Revival Wave," "Infant Praises," "Emory Hymnal," "Showers of Blessing," "Temple Songs," "Prohibition Melodist," "Sunlit Songs," "Radiant Songs," Songs of Triumph," "Glad Hallelujahs," "Songs of Joy and Gladness—Nos. 1 and 2" "Hymns of the Gospel—New and Old" (published in London, England), two anthem books called—"Anthems and Voluntaries" and "Banner Anthems," and in connection with John Wanamaker, "Living Hymns" Sweney also Wrote a number of services and cantatas, and associated with Kirkpatrick a temperance cantata entitled, "The Water Fairies". He partnered with Fanny Crosby and published over twenty of her hymns in his hymnals. He was editor or associate editor of about sixty books.

He died on April 10, 1899, and was interred at Chester Rural Cemetery in Chester, Pennsylvania.

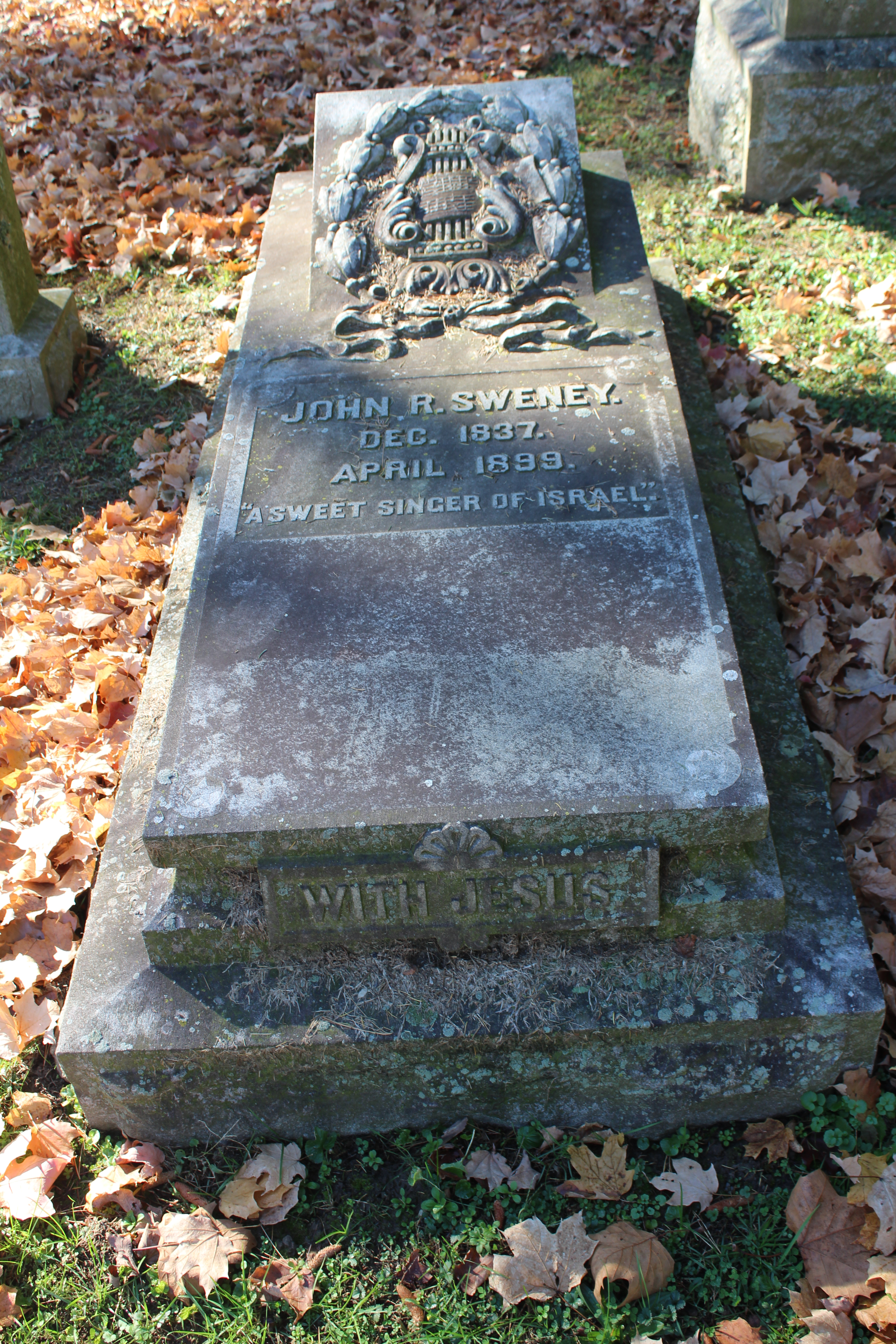
John R. Sweney gravestone in Chester Rural Cemetery

== Bibliography ==
- Goodly Pearls for the Sunday-School, Philadelphia, John J. Hood, 1875
- Dew of Hermon: Spiritual Songs, Delaware, T.C. O'Kane, 1878
- The Garner: Songs and Hymns for Sunday Schools, Prayer Meetings, Temperance, and Gospel Meetings, Philadelphia, John J. Hood, 1878
- Joy to the World: or Sacred Songs for Gospel Meetings, New York, Phillips & Hunt, 1879
- The Quiver of Sacred Song, for use in Sunday Schools, Prayer Meetings, Gospel Meetings, etc., Philadelphia, John J. Hood, 1880
- Anthems and Voluntaries for the Church Choir, Philadelphia, John J. Hood, 1881
- The Ark of Praise: Containing Sacred Songs and Hymns for the Sabbath, School, Prayer Meeting, Etc., Philadelphia, John J. Hood, 1882
- Our Sabbath Home Praise Book, Philadelphia, John J. Hood, 1884
- Melodious Sonnets for Sacred Service, Philadelphia, John J. Hood, 1885
- Songs of Joy and Gladness, Boston, McDonald, Gill, & Co., 1886
- On Joyful Wing: A Book of Praise and Song, Philadelphia, John J. Hood, 1886
- Glad Hallelujahs: Replete with Sacred Songs, Philadelphia, Thos. T. Tasker, Sr., 1887
- Songs of Redeeming Love, No. 2, Philadelphia, John J. Hood, 1887
- Sunlit Songs: For Use in Meeting for Christian Worship of Work, Philadelphia, John J. Hood, 1890
- Winning Songs: For Use in Meetings for Christian Worship or Work, Philadelphia, John J. Hood, 1892
- Praise in Song: A Collection of Hymns and Sacred Melodies, Adapted for Use by Sunday Schools, Endeavor Societies, Epworth Leagues, Evangelists, Pastors, Choristors, etc., Philadelphia, John J. Hood, 1893
- Songs of Love and Praise: For Use in Meetings for Christian Worship or Work, Philadelphia, John J. Hood, 1894
- Bow of Promise: Hymns New and Old for Missionary and Revival Meetings and Sabbath-Schools, Chicago, R.R. McCabe & Co., 1898
