= Gordon Mote =

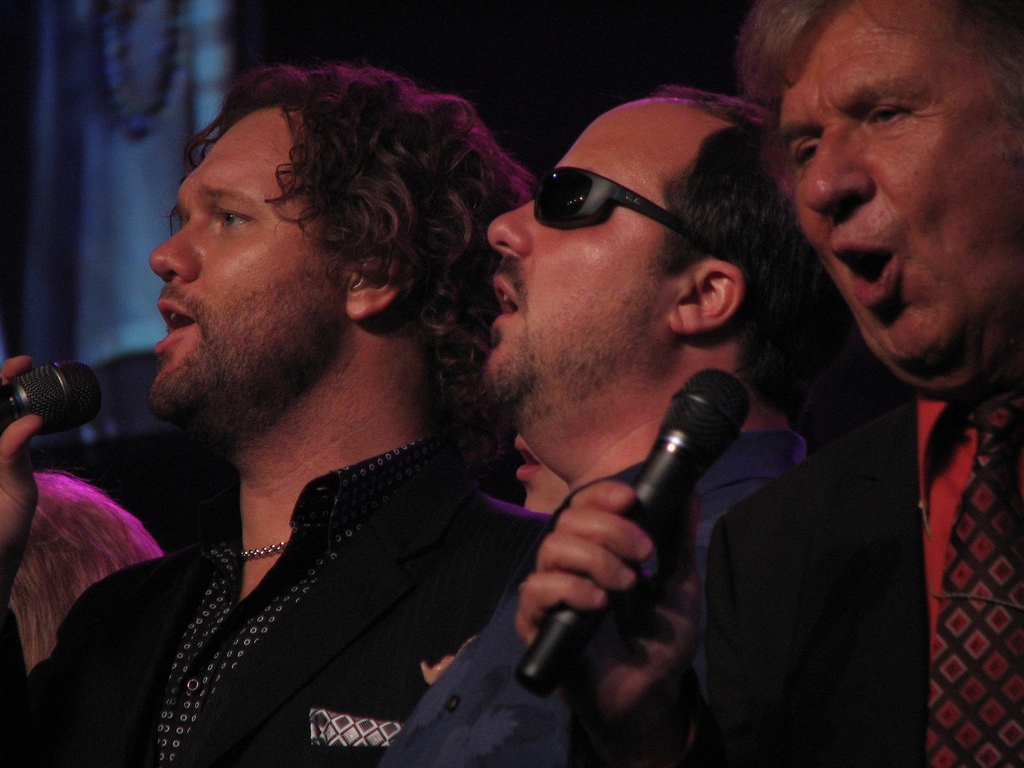
- Mote (center) with David Phelps (left) and Bill Gaither (right)

Background information
- Born: Gordon James Mote; October 25, 1970 (age 55); Gadsden, Alabama
- Origin: Nashville, Tennessee
- Genres: Christian country, CCM, southern gospel
- Occupations: Singer, songwriter, instrumentalist
- Instruments: Vocals, piano
- Years active: 2000–present
- Labels: Spring Hill
- Website: gordonmote.com

Gordon James Mote (born October 25, 1970) is an American Christian country/southern gospel singer, piano player, and worship leader. He was born blind. He has released eight studio albums. His album Don't Let Me Miss the Glory (2007) was his breakthrough on the Billboard charts.

== Early life ==
Mote was born, on October 25, 1970, in Gadsden, Alabama, as a blind person, where he grew up in nearby Attalla. He attended both Jacksonville State University, where he spent the first three years of his music education, while he transferred to Belmont University in Nashville, Tennessee, where he graduated with honors in music.

== Music career ==
Just after graduating, Lee Greenwood asked Mote to join his band. Since then, he has toured with artists such as Trisha Yearwood, Tanya Tucker, Porter Wagoner, the Gaither Vocal Band, and the Gaither Homecoming Tour. In 2001, when a pianist was needed for Alan Jackson's "Where Were You (When the World Stopped Turning)" recording, Mote was recommended. After that, he became a very sought-after studio musician, playing on numerous country and gospel artist's albums.

His studio album, Don't Let Me Miss the Glory, was his debut as a vocalist. It was released on October 23, 2007, with Spring Hill Records. This album was his breakthrough, appearing on the Billboard magazine charts, peaking at No. 170 on the Billboard 200 and No. 10 on the Christian Albums chart.

== Discography ==
=== Albums ===
Title	Album details	Peak chart positions	
Title	Album details	US 200	US CHR
Christmas Piano: The Holly and the Ivory	Released: December 27, 2005; Label: Spring Hill / EMI CMG	—	—
Piano Hymns: If You Could Hear What I See	Released: January 31, 2006; Label: EMI Christian Music Group	—	—
Don't Let Me Miss the Glory	Released: October 23, 2007; Label: Spring Hill	170	10
I Will Sing	Released: March 9, 2010; Label: New Haven	—	—
Songs I Grew Up Singing	Released: August 7, 2012; Label: New Haven / Provident	—	—
The Star Still Shines	Released: October 16, 2012; Label: New Haven	—	—
All Things New	Released: August 27, 2013; Label: New Haven	—	—
Hymns and Songs of Inspiration	Released: October 23, 2015; Label: New Haven	—	—
Love, Love, Love	Released: August 3, 2018; Label: New Haven	—	—

=== Gaither Homecoming Video featured performances ===
- 2007: How Great Thou Art; "Shall We Gather at the River"
- 2008: Homecoming Picnic; "Sweet Forgiveness"
- 2008: Country Bluegrass Homecoming, Volume 1; "I Know Somebody Who Does"
- 2008: Country Bluegrass Homecoming, Volume 2; "Ain't Gonna Give Up on God"
- 2010: Giving Thanks; "Everything Is Beautiful"
- 2011: Alaskan Homecoming; "I'm Working on a Road"
- 2011: Majesty; "When I Lift Up My Head", "Heaven's Jubilee"
- 2012: Mercy Walked In

== Awards and nominations ==
Year	Association	Category	Nominated work	Result	Ref.
2003–06	Academy of Country Music Awards	Piano/Keyboards Player of the Year		Nominated	
2008/10	Academy of Country Music Awards	Piano/Keyboards Player of the Year		Won	
2012–14	Academy of Country Music Awards	Piano/Keyboards Player of the Year		Nominated	
2015	GMA Dove Awards	Country Song of the Year	"Ain't It Just Like The Lord" (shared with songwriters)	Nominated	
2019	Academy of Country Music Awards	Piano/Keyboards Player of the Year		Won	
