= Big Shiny Tunes =

Series of compilation albums

Muchmusic's Big Shiny Tunes

Compilation album series by Various Artists

Big Shiny Tunes is a series of rock albums compiled and released by the Canadian music television station MuchMusic, and through MusiquePlus in Quebec, from 1996 to 2009. The best-selling album of the series was Big Shiny Tunes 2, which was certified Diamond in Canada (1,000,000 units) by the CRIA on March 25, 1998. It has been cited as the best-selling album series in Canadian history, with 5 million albums sold in ten years.

== Characteristics ==
The Big Shiny Tunes albums are each thought to be composed of a combination of rock songs that are major hits by well-known artists, less successful songs by well-known artists and songs by more obscure artists, released in the same year as the albums' publication. There are a combination of Canadian, British and American performers. One common feature among the selected artists is that they are attached to Universal Music, Warner Bros., EMI Music Canada, and/or MuchMusic, who come together to produce Big Shiny Tunes albums. The most frequently appearing band in the Big Shiny Tunes series is Nickelback, who appeared on seven releases in the series (Big Shiny Tunes 5, 7 through 11, and 14). The first six Big Shiny Tunes albums were all released on both CD and cassette formats; entries in the series were released solely on CD starting with Big Shiny Tunes 7 in 2002.

Part of the appeal of the series is that those who do not usually buy albums will find Big Shiny Tunes provides several well-known songs, as opposed to a CD by a single artist whose non-single tracks may be relatively unfamiliar. The music is aimed at teenagers and young adults. There has been some criticism of consistency in regards to the use of censored versus uncensored versions of songs from album to album. Big Shiny Tunes 6 carried a label stating that some songs contained coarse language, while the previous and following albums had censored songs by Matthew Good, Limp Bizkit, Staind, Not By Choice and Wheatus.

In addition to the ordinary albums in the series, MuchMusic also released albums that compile the biggest hits across a span of years, such as Big Shiny 80s (2005) that included classics like Billy Idol's "White Wedding." There have also been two volumes of Big Shiny 90s released.

== History ==
The first edition of Big Shiny Tunes was released in 1996. The compilation was successful, being certified Triple Platinum in Canada. Big Shiny Tunes 2 was released in 1997 to greater success. The second entry sold 128,000 copies in its first week alone, before going on to sell 1,230,000 copies overall. This makes the entry the third best-selling album of all time in Canada of the Nielsen SoundScan era. Big Shiny Tunes 3 was released in 1998, which was also very successful. The second and third editions alone would account for over 2,000,000 copies of Big Shiny Tunes albums sold. Following editions of Big Shiny Tunes reached #1 on the Canadian Albums Chart, the last being Big Shiny Tunes 6, which sold 68,500 copies in its first week in 2001.

The series soon lost its predominance with the growth of peer-to-peer file sharing in the 2000s. The last album in the series, Big Shiny Tunes 14, was released in 2009. As of 2010, the series went on an indefinite hiatus before being discontinued.

== Charts and certifications ==
Year	Title	Peak chart positions	Certifications
Year	Title	CAN	CRIA
1996	Big Shiny Tunes	3	3× Platinum
1997	Big Shiny Tunes 2	1	Diamond
1998	Big Shiny Tunes 3	1	8× Platinum
1999	Big Shiny Tunes 4	1	8× Platinum
2000	Big Shiny Tunes 5	1	6× Platinum
2001	Big Shiny Tunes 6	1	
2002	Big Shiny Tunes 7	2	3× Platinum
2002	Big Shiny 90's	5	2× Platinum
2003	Big Shiny 90's Volume 2	34	
2003	Big Shiny Tunes 8	4	2× Platinum
2004	Big Shiny Tunes 9	7	Platinum
2004	Big Shiny 80's	38	
2005	Big Shiny Tunes 10	7	
2006	Big Shiny Tunes 11	6	Platinum
2007	Big Shiny Tunes 12	10	Gold
2008	Big Shiny Tunes 13	21	
2009	Big Shiny Tunes 14	17	

== Albums ==
=== Big Shiny Tunes ===
Big Shiny Tunes

Compilation album by Various
- Released: 12/3/1996
- Length: 71:08
- Labels: Universal Music, MCA

Various chronology
Big Shiny Tunes (1996)	Big Shiny Tunes 2 (1997)

CD
No.	Title	Artist	Length
1.	"One More Astronaut"	I Mother Earth (1996)	5:24
2.	"Machinehead"	Bush^{X} (1996)	4:15
3.	"Tahitian Moon"	Porno for Pyros (1996)	3:47
4.	"Queer"	Garbage (1995)	4:36
5.	"Sweet Dreams (Are Made of This)"	Marilyn Manson (1995)	4:52
6.	"Scooby Snacks"	Fun Lovin' Criminals (1996)	3:02
7.	"Just a Girl"	No Doubt (1995)	3:28
8.	"Aeroplane"	Red Hot Chili Peppers (1996)	4:44
9.	"The Good in Everyone"	Sloan (1996)	2:16
10.	"King of New Orleans"	Better Than Ezra (1996)	4:07
11.	"Tinfoil"	Limblifter (1996)	2:34
12.	"Alone + Easy Target"	Foo Fighters (1996)	4:05
13.	"Ophelia"	Moist (1996)	3:49
14.	"Just"	Radiohead (1995)	3:52
15.	"Angry Johnny"	Poe (1995)	4:19
16.	"Rave + Drool"	The Killjoys (1996)	4:00
17.	"Paste"	Pluto (1996)	3:20
18.	"Novacane"	Beck (1996)	4:38

Note: Was certified 3× Platinum (300,000 units) in Canada on April 24, 1997.

=== Big Shiny Tunes 2 ===
Big Shiny Tunes 2

Compilation album by Various
- Released: 12/2/1997
- Length: 66:22
- Label: WEA

Various chronology
Big Shiny Tunes (1996)	Big Shiny Tunes 2 (1997)	Big Shiny Tunes 3 (1998)

CD
No.	Title	Artist	Length
1.	"Breathe"	The Prodigy (1996)	3:59
2.	"Song 2"	Blur (1997)	2:02
3.	"Semi-Charmed Life"	Third Eye Blind (1997)	4:52
4.	"Walkin' on the Sun"	Smash Mouth (1997)	3:25
5.	"Fly"	Sugar Ray featuring Super Cat (1997)	4:52
6.	"Drinking in L.A."	Bran Van 3000 (1997)	3:56
7.	"The Beautiful People"	Marilyn Manson (1997)	3:41
8.	"Numb"	Holly McNarland (1997)	3:56
9.	"Swallowed"	Bush (1996)	4:18
10.	"Push"	Matchbox Twenty (1997)	3:59
11.	"Precious Declaration" (Remix)	Collective Soul (1997)	3:38
12.	"Temptation" (Tom Lord-Alge Mix)	The Tea Party (1997)	2:45
13.	"Block Rockin' Beats"	The Chemical Brothers (1997)	3:25
14.	"My Old Self"	Wide Mouth Mason (1997)	3:47
15.	"Paranoid Android"	Radiohead (1997)	6:23
16.	"Remote Control"	The Age of Electric (1996)	3:39
17.	"Lady Picture Show"	Stone Temple Pilots (1996)	4:07

Note: Best-selling album of the series. Was certified Diamond in Canada (1,000,000 units) on March 25, 1998.

=== Big Shiny Tunes 3 ===
Big Shiny Tunes 3

Compilation album by Various
- Released: 12/1/1998
- Length: 70:48
- Label: EMI Music Canada

Various chronology
Big Shiny Tunes 2 (1997)	Big Shiny Tunes 3 (1998)	Big Shiny Tunes 4 (1999)

CD
No.	Title	Artist	Length
1.	"Ava Adore"	The Smashing Pumpkins (1998)	4:20
2.	"The Way"	Fastball (1998)	4:16
3.	"My Hero"	Foo Fighters (1997)	4:20
4.	"Apparitions"	Matthew Good Band (1997)	4:00
5.	"Closing Time"	Semisonic (1998)	4:38
6.	"One Week"	Barenaked Ladies (1998)	2:52
7.	"Three MC's and One DJ"	Beastie Boys (1998)	2:50
8.	"Dragula" (The Hot Rod Herman Mix)	Rob Zombie (1998)	4:30
9.	"How's It Going to Be"	Third Eye Blind (1997)	4:14
10.	"Money City Maniacs"	Sloan (1998)	3:53
11.	"Fly Away"	Lenny Kravitz (1998)	3:41
12.	"Pure Morning"	Placebo (1998)	3:52
13.	"Push It"	Garbage (1998)	4:01
14.	"Karma Police"	Radiohead (1997)	4:20
15.	"Iris"	Goo Goo Dolls (1998)	4:52
16.	"That Song"	Big Wreck (1997)	5:04
17.	"Space Lord"	Monster Magnet (1998)	5:55

Note: Was certified 8× Platinum in Canada (800,000 units) on February 19, 1999.

=== Big Shiny Tunes 4 ===
Big Shiny Tunes 4

Compilation album by Various
- Released: 11/23/1999
- Length: 68:29
- Label: EMI Music Canada

Various chronology
Big Shiny Tunes 3 (1998)	Big Shiny Tunes 4 (1999)	Big Shiny Tunes 5 (2000)

CD
No.	Title	Artist	Length
1.	"American Woman"	Lenny Kravitz (1999)	4:21
2.	"Breathe" (TLA Mix)	Moist (1999)	4:46
3.	"Someday"	Sugar Ray (1999)	4:02
4.	"Hello Time Bomb"	Matthew Good Band (1999)	3:57
5.	"What's My Age Again?"	Blink-182 (1999)	2:30
6.	"Slide"	Goo Goo Dolls (1998)	3:32
7.	"Praise You"	Fatboy Slim (1999)	5:22
8.	"Bawitdaba"	Kid Rock (1998)	4:25
9.	"All Star"	Smash Mouth (1999)	3:20
10.	"Heaven Coming Down"	The Tea Party (1999)	4:00
11.	"Let Forever Be"	The Chemical Brothers featuring Noel Gallagher (1999)	3:55
12.	"Blue Monday"	Orgy (1998)	4:25
13.	"Scar Tissue"	Red Hot Chili Peppers (1999)	3:36
14.	"Summertime in the Void"	I Mother Earth (1999)	4:57
15.	"Anthem for the Year 2000"	Silverchair (1999)	4:07
16.	"Mistake"	Serial Joe (1999)	3:08
17.	"You Don't Know What It's Like"	Econoline Crush (1998)	4:06

Note: Was certified 8× Platinum in Canada (800,000 units) on November 6, 2000.

=== Big Shiny Tunes 5 ===
Big Shiny Tunes 5

Compilation album by Various
- Released: 11/28/2000
- Length: 71:25
- Label: WEA (Canada)

Various chronology
Big Shiny Tunes 4 (1999)	Big Shiny Tunes 5 (2000)	Big Shiny Tunes 6 (2001)

CD
No.	Title	Artist	Length
1.	"Bent"	Matchbox Twenty (2000)	4:16
2.	"Load Me Up"	Matthew Good Band (1999)	3:41
3.	"Kryptonite"	3 Doors Down (2000)	3:55
4.	"Sour Girl"	Stone Temple Pilots (1999)	4:18
5.	"The Bad Touch"	Bloodhound Gang (1999)	3:40
6.	"American Psycho"	Treble Charger (2000)	3:25
7.	"Take a Picture"	Filter (2000)	4:23
8.	"Wonderful"	Everclear (2000)	4:20
9.	"Adam's Song"	Blink-182 (1999)	4:08
10.	"Re-Arranged"	Limp Bizkit (2000)	4:09
11.	"Teenage Dirtbag"	Wheatus (2000)	4:02
12.	"Otherside"	Red Hot Chili Peppers (1999)	4:16
13.	"Makes No Difference"	Sum 41 (2000)	3:10
14.	"Change (In the House of Flies)"	Deftones (1999)	3:58
15.	"Stupify"	Disturbed (2000)	4:06
16.	"More"	j. Englishman (2000)	3:23
17.	"Only God Knows Why"	Kid Rock (2000)	4:16
18.	"Breathe"	Nickelback (2000)	3:59

Note: Was certified 6× Platinum (600,000 units) in Canada on December 6, 2001.

=== Big Shiny Tunes 6 ===
Big Shiny Tunes 6

Compilation album by Various
- Released: 11/13/2001
- Length: 67:03
- Label: Universal

Various chronology
Big Shiny Tunes 5 (2000)	Big Shiny Tunes 6 (2001)	Big Shiny Tunes 7 (2002)

CD
No.	Title	Artist	Length
1.	"One Step Closer"	Linkin Park (2000)	2:36
2.	"The Rock Show"	Blink-182 (2001)	2:52
3.	"Flavor of the Weak"	American Hi-Fi (2001)	3:08
4.	"Fat Lip"	Sum 41 (2001)	2:58
5.	"Wasting My Time"	Default (2001)	4:28
6.	"My Way"	Limp Bizkit (2001)	4:33
7.	"Control"	Puddle of Mudd (2001)	3:48
8.	"Hash Pipe"	Weezer (2001)	3:06
9.	"Days of the Week"	Stone Temple Pilots (2001)	2:35
10.	"When It's Over"	Sugar Ray (2001)	3:37
11.	"Life"	Our Lady Peace (2001)	4:16
12.	"Clint Eastwood"	Gorillaz featuring Del the Funky Homosapien (2000)	5:41
13.	"South Side"	Moby (2000)	3:48
14.	"I Love Myself Today"	Bif Naked (2001)	3:30
15.	"Be Like That"	3 Doors Down (2001)	4:25
16.	"Alone in the Universe"	David Usher (2001)	3:54
17.	"Breakdown"	Tantric (2001)	3:10
18.	"Walking Wounded"	The Tea Party (2001)	4:38

Note: Sold 68,500 copies in its first week. However, it has not been certified by the CRIA/Music Canada.

=== Big Shiny Tunes 7 ===
Big Shiny Tunes 7

Compilation album by Various
- Released: 11/12/2002
- Length: 64:51
- Label: Universal

Various chronology
Big Shiny 90s (2002)	Big Shiny Tunes 7 (2002)	Big Shiny Tunes 8 (2003)

CD
No.	Title	Artist	Length
1.	"Too Bad"	Nickelback (2002)	3:51
2.	"Youth of the Nation"	P.O.D. (2002)	4:16
3.	"It's Been Awhile"	Staind (2001)	4:25
4.	"Drift & Die"	Puddle of Mudd (2002)	4:22
5.	"Nothing Could Come Between Us"	Theory of a Deadman (2002)	3:25
6.	"Brother Down"	Sam Roberts (2002)	4:22
7.	"In My Place"	Coldplay (2002)	3:47
8.	"Weapon"	Matthew Good (2002)	4:54
9.	"Sweetness"	Jimmy Eat World (2002)	3:36
10.	"Standing All Alone"	Not By Choice (2002)	2:49
11.	"In Too Deep"	Sum 41 (2001)	3:26
12.	"My Friends Over You"	New Found Glory (2002)	3:40
13.	"Dope Nose"	Weezer (2002)	2:15
14.	"Hero"	Chad Kroeger featuring Josey Scott (2002)	3:10
15.	"Lovercall"	Danko Jones (2001)	2:52
16.	"Get Free"	The Vines (2002)	2:05
17.	"She Loves Me Not"	Papa Roach (2002)	3:29
18.	"Where Do We Go From Here?"	Filter (2002)	4:07

Note: Was certified 3× Platinum (300,000 units) in Canada on September 17, 2009.

=== Big Shiny Tunes 8 ===
Big Shiny Tunes 8

Compilation album by Various
- Released: 11/18/2003
- Length: 64:17
- Label: Warner

Various chronology
Big Shiny Tunes 7 (2002)	Big Shiny Tunes 8 (2003)	Big Shiny '90s Volume 2 (2003)

CD
No.	Title	Artist	Length
1.	"Somewhere I Belong"	Linkin Park (2003)	3:35
2.	"Just Because"	Jane's Addiction (2002)	3:51
3.	"Girl's Not Grey"	AFI (2003)	3:10
4.	"Dosed"	Red Hot Chili Peppers (2003)	4:34
5.	"Go with the Flow"	Queens of the Stone Age (2003)	3:03
6.	"I Hate Everything About You"	Three Days Grace (2003)	3:50
7.	"The Hell Song"	Sum 41 (2002)	3:18
8.	"Swing, Swing"	The All-American Rejects (2002)	3:26
9.	"Where Have All the Good People Gone?"	Sam Roberts (2003)	3:56
10.	"Addicted"	Simple Plan (2003)	3:53
11.	"Point to Prove"	Theory of a Deadman (2003)	3:38
12.	"Bye Bye Boyfriend"	Fefe Dobson (2003)	4:08
13.	"Flat on the Floor"	Nickelback (2003)	2:02
14.	"Headstrong"	Trapt (2002)	3:58
15.	"Now That You're Leaving"	Not by Choice (2003)	3:25
16.	"The Scientist"	Coldplay (2002)	5:09
17.	"Give Up the Grudge"	Gob (2003)	2:57
18.	"Get Loose"	The Salads (2003)	2:24

Note: Was certified 2× Platinum (200,000 units) in Canada on January 22, 2004.

=== Big Shiny Tunes 9 ===
Big Shiny Tunes 9

Compilation album by Various
- Released: 11/9/2004
- Length: 61:36
- Label: EMI Music Canada

Various chronology
Big Shiny Tunes 8 (2003)	Big Shiny Tunes 9 (2004)	Big Shiny Tunes 10 (2005)

CD
No.	Title	Artist	Length
1.	"River Below"	Billy Talent (2004)	2:58
2.	"Somebody Told Me"	The Killers (2004)	3:16
3.	"Everybody's Fool"	Evanescence (2004)	3:14
4.	"Take Me Out"	Franz Ferdinand (2004)	3:57
5.	"Feeling This"	Blink-182 (2003)	2:53
6.	"One Thing"	Finger Eleven (2003)	4:37
7.	"Cold Hard Bitch"	Jet (2004)	3:52
8.	"Figured You Out"	Nickelback (2003)	3:47
9.	"Ocean Avenue"	Yellowcard (2004)	3:17
10.	"Walk Idiot Walk"	The Hives (2004)	3:31
11.	"Get Your Hands off My Woman"	The Darkness (2003)	2:45
12.	"Writing's on the Wall"	The Tea Party (2004)	2:40
13.	"Where Are We Runnin'?"	Lenny Kravitz (2004)	2:42
14.	"Come Again"	Thornley (2004)	3:47
15.	"Overrated"	Pilate (2003)	3:18
16.	"I Believe"	The Marble Index (2004)	3:39
17.	"Same Direction"	Hoobastank (2004)	3:15
18.	"Accidents"	Alexisonfire (2004)	4:08

Note: Was certified Platinum in Canada (100,000 units) on March 22, 2005.

=== Big Shiny Tunes 10 ===
Big Shiny Tunes 10

Compilation album by Various
- Released: 11/22/2005
- Length: 66:06
- Label: EMI Music Canada

Various chronology
Big Shiny Tunes 9 (2004)	Big Shiny Tunes 10 (2005)	Big Shiny Tunes 11 (2006)

CD
No.	Title	Artist	Length
1.	"Helena"	My Chemical Romance (2004)	3:23
2.	"Speed of Sound"	Coldplay (2005)	4:48
3.	"All These Things That I've Done"	The Killers (2004)	5:01
4.	"All That I've Got"	The Used (2005)	3:23
5.	"Fight for All the Wrong Reasons"	Nickelback (2005)	3:42
6.	"Beverly Hills"	Weezer (2005)	3:16
7.	"Some Say"	Sum 41 (2005)	3:12
8.	"Remedy"	Seether (2004)	3:26
9.	"Nothing to Lose"	Billy Talent (2004)	3:37
10.	"When the Night Feels My Song"	Bedouin Soundclash (2005)	3:06
11.	"Untitled (How Could This Happen to Me?)"	Simple Plan (2005)	3:57
12.	"Feel Good Inc."	Gorillaz featuring De La Soul (2005)	3:41
13.	"Santa Monica"	Theory of a Deadman (2005)	4:05
14.	"No Transitory"	Alexisonfire (2004)	3:15
15.	"Middle of Nowhere"	Hot Hot Heat (2005)	4:00
16.	"Little Sister"	Queens Of The Stone Age (2005)	2:54
17.	"Montreal Calling"	Mobile (2005)	3:06
18.	"Dirty Water"	k-os featuring Sam Roberts (2004)	4:14

Notes: When the track listing was originally shown via online music stores such as Mymusic before the official site opened, "Holiday" by Green Day, "Be Yourself" by Audioslave, "B.Y.O.B." by System of a Down, "Rebellion (Lies)" by Arcade Fire, "E-Pro" by Beck, and "Best of You" by the Foo Fighters were shown to be on the album. These were replaced by songs by Nickelback, Weezer, Seether, Theory of a Deadman, Mobile, and k-os.

=== Big Shiny Tunes 11 ===
Big Shiny Tunes 11

Compilation album by Various
- Released: November 7, 2006
- Length: 71:52
- Label: EMI Music Canada

Various chronology
Big Shiny Tunes 10 (2005)	Big Shiny Tunes 11 (2006)	Big Shiny Tunes 12 (2007)

CD
No.	Title	Artist	Length
1.	"Miss Murder"	AFI (2006)	3:18
2.	"Devil in a Midnight Mass"	Billy Talent (2006)	2:51
3.	"This Could Be Anywhere In the World"	Alexisonfire (2006)	4:00
4.	"MakeDamnSure"	Taking Back Sunday (2006)	3:28
5.	"Rockstar"	Nickelback (2006)	4:12
6.	"Animal I Have Become"	Three Days Grace (2006)	3:50
7.	"The Kill (Bury Me)"	Thirty Seconds to Mars (2006)	3:45
8.	"Hate Me"	Blue October (2006)	4:17
9.	"Move Along"	The All-American Rejects (2006)	3:57
10.	"See Right Through Me"	Mobile (2006)	4:13
11.	"The Gate"	Sam Roberts (2006)	4:13
12.	"The Adventure"	Angels & Airwaves (2005)	4:40
13.	"Poster of a Girl"	Metric (2005)	4:43
14.	"Lights and Sounds"	Yellowcard (2005)	2:50
15.	"Writing on the Walls"	Underøath (2006)	4:03
16.	"Bat Country"	Avenged Sevenfold (2006)	5:12
17.	"Woman"	Wolfmother (2005)	2:27
18.	"Twisted Transistor"	Korn (2005)	2:59
19.	"Heaven Help Us" (bonus track)	My Chemical Romance (2006)	2:54

Notes: The album's official site also lists "Stricken" by Disturbed as being on the album as well. However, it does n appear in the final product. The album was certified Platinum in Canada (100,000 units) on February 1, 2007.

=== Big Shiny Tunes 12 ===
Big Shiny Tunes 12

Compilation album by Various
- Released: November 20, 2007
- Length: 62:19
- Label: EMI Music Canada

Various chronology
Big Shiny Tunes 11 (2006)	Big Shiny Tunes 12 (2007)	Big Shiny Tunes 13 (2008)

CD
No.	Title	Artist	Length
1.	"Paralyzer"	Finger Eleven (2007)	3:27
2.	"3's & 7's"	Queens of the Stone Age (2007)	3:34
3.	"The Good Left Undone"	Rise Against (2007)	3:02
4.	"Never Too Late"	Three Days Grace (2006)	3:29
5.	"Wake Up Call"	Maroon 5 (2007)	3:21
6.	"The Take Over, The Breaks Over"	Fall Out Boy (2007)	3:33
7.	"Surrender"	Billy Talent (2007)	4:06
8.	"Shake Tramp"	Marianas Trench (2006)	3:35
9.	"Nothing Special"	illScarlett (2007)	3:29
10.	"Underclass Hero"	Sum 41 (2007)	3:16
11.	"Old Habits Die Hard"	Ten Second Epic (2007)	3:44
12.	"The Heinrich Maneuver"	Interpol (2007)	3:29
13.	"The Bird And The Worm"	The Used (2007)	3:47
14.	"Rough Hands"	Alexisonfire (2007)	3:48
15.	"Walls Fall Down"	Bedouin Soundclash (2007)	2:31
16.	"Flathead"	The Fratellis (2006)	3:18
17.	"Face Down"	The Red Jumpsuit Apparatus (2007)	3:12
18.	"Evolution"	Korn (2007)	3:38

Note: Was certified Gold in Canada (50,000 units) on July 30, 2008.

=== Big Shiny Tunes 13 ===
Big Shiny Tunes 13

Compilation album by Various
- Released: October 28, 2008
- Length: 66:37
- Label: EMI Music Canada

Various chronology
Big Shiny Tunes 12 (2007)	Big Shiny Tunes 13 (2008)	Big Shiny Tunes 14 (2009)

CD
No.	Title	Artist	Length
1.	"Pork and Beans"	Weezer (2007)	3:09
2.	"Violet Hill"	Coldplay (2008)	3:18
3.	"Inside the Fire"	Disturbed (2008)	3:51
4.	"Tessellate"	Tokyo Police Club (2007)	2:37
5.	"Given Up"	Linkin Park (2008)	3:09
6.	"Sorry"	Buckcherry (2007)	3:46
7.	"Make It wit Chu"	Queens of the Stone Age (2007)	4:52
8.	"Weighty Ghost"	Wintersleep (2007)	3:04
9.	"Rise Above This"	Seether (2008)	3:23
10.	"Nine in the Afternoon"	Panic! at the Disco (2007)	3:13
11.	"Hollowpoint Sniper Hyperbole"	Ubiquitous Synergy Seeker (2008)	3:46
12.	"Them Kids"	Sam Roberts (2008)	3:57
13.	"Love Is Noise"	The Verve (2007)	5:27
14.	"Saved By Strangers"	Die Mannequin (2007)	3:23
15.	"Sequoia Throne"	Protest the Hero (2007)	3:13
16.	"Always Where I Need to Be"	The Kooks (2008)	2:40
17.	"Salute Your Solution"	The Raconteurs (2007)	3:01
18.	"Addicted"	Saving Abel (2007)	3:43
19.	"Youth Games"	The Mission District (2008)	3:05

=== Big Shiny Tunes 14 ===
Big Shiny Tunes 14

Compilation album by Various
- Released: October 20, 2009
- Length: 74:11
- Label: EMI Music Canada

Various chronology
Big Shiny Tunes 13 (2008)	Big Shiny Tunes 14 (2009)

CD
No.	Title	Artist	Length
1.	"Know Your Enemy"	Green Day (2009)	3:10
2.	"Audience of One"	Rise Against (2009)	4:05
3.	"Too Many Rappers"	Beastie Boys featuring Nas (2007)	4:23
4.	"Rusted from the Rain"	Billy Talent (2009)	4:14
5.	"Real World"	The All-American Rejects (2009)	4:04
6.	"Ignorance"	Paramore (2008)	3:38
7.	"Burn It to the Ground"	Nickelback (2009)	3:30
8.	"Young Cardinals"	Alexisonfire (2009)	3:38
9.	"Check My Brain"	Alice in Chains (2009)	3:58
10.	"Blood on My Hands"	The Used (2009)	3:19
11.	"Bad Medicine"	Die Mannequin (2009)	3:30
12.	"All to Myself"	Marianas Trench (2009)	3:10
13.	"All You Did Was Save My Life"	Our Lady Peace (2009)	3:48
14.	"Oh, the Boss Is Coming!"	Arkells (2009)	3:40
15.	"Second Chance"	Shinedown (2008)	3:40
16.	"So Over You"	The Mission District (2009)	3:13
17.	"Every Day"	Ten Second Epic featuring Lights (2009)	3:27
18.	"Careless Whisper"	Seether (2009)	4:56
19.	"She's a Genius"	Jet (2009)	2:59
20.	"All Over Me"	Default (2009)	3:49

=== Big Shiny '90s ===
Big Shiny '90s

Compilation album by Various
- Released: January 2002
- Length: 132:11
- Label: EMI Music Canada

Various chronology
Big Shiny '90s (2002)	Big Shiny Tunes 7 (2003)

Disc 1:

CD
No.	Title	Artist	Length
1.	"Dammit"	Blink-182 (1997)	2:46
2.	"Been Caught Stealing"	Jane's Addiction (1990)	3:31
3.	"Mysterious Ways"	U2 (1991)	4:01
4.	"Wonderwall"	Oasis (1995)	4:19
5.	"The Rockafeller Skank"	Fatboy Slim (1998)	4:00
6.	"Cowboy"	Kid Rock (1999)	4:06
7.	"Indestructible"	Matthew Good Band (1998)	3:24
8.	"Fake Plastic Trees"	Radiohead (1995)	4:50
9.	"What's the Frequency, Kenneth?"	R.E.M. (1994)	3:59
10.	"Lightning Crashes"	Live (1995)	5:25
11.	"The Oaf (My Luck Is Wasted)"	Big Wreck (1998)	3:56
12.	"3 A.M."	Matchbox Twenty (1997)	3:46
13.	"Tomorrow"	Silverchair (1994)	4:26
14.	"Zombie"	The Cranberries (1994)	5:06
15.	"Everything Zen"	Bush (1994)	4:38
16.	"Friday I'm in Love"	The Cure (1992)	3:34
17.	"Sex and Candy"	Marcy Playground (1998)	2:54
Total length:			68:41

Disc 2:

CD
No.	Title	Artist	Length
1.	"No Rain"	Blind Melon (1992)	3:36
2.	"Santa Monica"	Everclear (1997)	3:12
3.	"The Impression That I Get"	The Mighty Mighty Bosstones (1997)	3:13
4.	"Shine"	Collective Soul (1993/1997)	3:55
5.	"What It's Like"	Everlast (1998/1999)	4:36
6.	"Never Let You Go"	Third Eye Blind (2000)	3:56
7.	"Only Happy When It Rains"	Garbage (1996)	3:55
8.	"Pets"	Porno for Pyros (1993)	3:36
9.	"What I Got"	Sublime (1996)	3:02
10.	"Volcano Girls"	Veruca Salt (1997)	3:18
11.	"All That You Are"	Econoline Crush (1997)	3:40
12.	"Epic"	Faith No More (1990)	4:51
13.	"Push"	Moist (1994)	3:50
14.	"In the Meantime"	Spacehog (1996)	4:58
15.	"Stutter"	Elastica (1994)	2:22
16.	"Enjoy the Silence"	Depeche Mode (1990)	4:14
17.	"Someone Who's Cool"	Odds (1997)	3:16
Total length:			63:30

Note: Was certified 2× Platinum (200,000 units) in Canada in February 2004.

=== Big Shiny '90s Volume 2 ===
Big Shiny '90s Volume 2

Compilation album by Various
- Released: December 9, 2003
- Length: 136:49
- Label: EMI Music Canada

Various chronology
Big Shiny '90s (2002)	Big Shiny '90s Volume 2 (2003)	Big Shiny Tunes 7 (2003)

Disc 1:

CD
No.	Title	Artist	Length
1.	"Buddy Holly"	Weezer (1994)	2:40
2.	"Champagne Supernova"	Oasis (1996)	7:28
3.	"All the Small Things"	Blink-182 (1999)	2:51
4.	"Numb"	U2 (1992)	4:20
5.	"Stop!"	Jane's Addiction (1995)	4:14
6.	"Cannonball"	The Breeders (1997)	3:35
7.	"Girls & Boys"	Blur (1994)	4:48
8.	"Underwhelmed"	Sloan (1992)	4:43
9.	"Good"	Better Than Ezra (1995)	3:06
10.	"All Over You"	Live (1994)	3:59
11.	"Gel"	Collective Soul (1994)	2:58
12.	"Everything to Everyone"	Everclear (1999)	3:20
13.	"Hey Man, Nice Shot"	Filter (1997)	4:22
14.	"Firestarter"	The Prodigy (1996)	3:47
15.	"More Human than Human"	White Zombie (1996)	4:29
16.	"Block Rockin' Beats"	The Chemical Brothers (1997)	5:14
17.	"Glycerine"	Bush (1995)	4:26
Total length:			70:20

Disc 2:

CD
No.	Title	Artist	Length
1.	"The Dope Show"	Marilyn Manson (1998)	3:47
2.	"Celebrity Skin"	Hole (1998)	2:43
3.	"Walkin' on the Sun"	Smash Mouth (1997)	3:26
4.	"Jumper"	Third Eye Blind (1998)	4:33
5.	"The Old Apartment"	Barenaked Ladies (1997)	3:26
6.	"So Gently We Go (Edit)"	I Mother Earth (1994)	3:59
7.	"Right Here, Right Now"	Jesus Jones (1990)	3:08
8.	"Eat My Brain"	Odds (1997)	4:26
9.	"Drive"	R.E.M. (1993)	4:25
10.	"When I Grow Up"	Garbage (1998)	3:24
11.	"Standing Outside a Broken Phone Booth with Money in My Hand"	Primitive Radio Gods (1996)	5:35
12.	"Lovefool"	The Cardigans (1996)	3:14
13.	"Policy of Truth"	Depeche Mode (1990)	5:14
14.	"Salvation"	The Cranberries (1996)	2:24
15.	"Sparkle and Shine"	Econoline Crush (1998)	3:41
16.	"Silver"	Moist (1995)	4:16
17.	"Pictures of You"	The Cure (1990)	4:48
Total length:			66:29

=== Big Shiny '80s ===
Big Shiny '80s

Compilation album by Various
- Released: 2004
- Genre: New Wave
- Label: EMI Music Canada

Various chronology
Big Shiny '90s Volume 2 (2003)	Big Shiny '80s (2004)

Disc 1:

1. The Buggles – "Video Killed the Radio Star" (1979)
2. Gary Numan – "Cars" (1980)
3. Blondie – "Call Me" (1980)
4. Duran Duran – "Hungry Like the Wolf" (1984)
5. A Flock of Seagulls – "I Ran (So Far Away)" (1981)
6. The Fixx – "One Thing Leads to Another" (1985)
7. Talk Talk – "It's My Life" (1983)
8. INXS – "Original Sin" (1989)
9. David Bowie – "Modern Love" (1983)
10. Peter Gabriel – "Shock the Monkey" (1983)
11. The Cars – "You Might Think" (1981)
12. Devo – "Whip It" (1981)
13. Martha and the Muffins – "Echo Beach" (1980)
14. Squeeze – "Another Nail in My Heart" (1983)
15. Nena – "99 Luftballons" (1982)

Disc 2:

1. The Clash – "Train in Vain" (1980)
2. The Boomtown Rats – "I Don't Like Mondays" (1979)
3. Billy Idol – "White Wedding" (1982/1984)
4. The Pretenders – "Back on the Chain Gang" (1983)
5. Fine Young Cannibals – "Suspicious Minds" (1986)
6. Ramones – "Rock 'n' Roll High School" (1980)
7. The B-52's – "Love Shack" (1989)
8. Rough Trade – "High School Confidential" (1980)
9. The Psychedelic Furs – "Love My Way" (1982)
10. Split Enz – "I Got You" (1985)
11. The Dream Academy – "Life in a Northern Town" (1986)
12. Chalk Circle – "April Fool" (1985)
13. Tears for Fears – "Pale Shelter" (1982/1983)
14. The Cure – "In Between Days" (1985)
15. Naked Eyes – "Always Something There to Remind Me" (1983)

== See also ==
- MuchDance, a compilation series by MuchMusic first released in 1990 and by MusiquePlus as DansePlus until 2019. It was released in the U.S. as Dance Mix USA between 1993 and 1998.
- ((DIRECT))
