= List of number-one albums of 2001 (Canada) =

These are the Canadian number-one albums of 2001. The chart is compiled by Nielsen Soundscan and published by Jam! Canoe, issued every Sunday. The chart also appears in Billboard magazine as Top Canadian Albums.

Issue date	Album	Artist
January 6	1	The Beatles
January 13	Big Shiny Tunes 5	Various Artists
January 20	Big Shiny Tunes 5	Various Artists
January 27	1	The Beatles
February 3	Big Shiny Tunes 5	Various Artists
February 10	J. Lo	Jennifer Lopez
February 17	J. Lo	Jennifer Lopez
February 24	Hot Shot	Shaggy
March 3	Hot Shot	Shaggy
March 10	Hot Shot	Shaggy
March 17	Everyday	Dave Matthews Band
March 24	Hot Shot	Shaggy
March 31	Hot Shot	Shaggy
April 7	Hot Shot	Shaggy
April 14	Hot Shot	Shaggy
April 21	Hot Shot	Shaggy
April 28	Hot Shot	Shaggy
May 5	Hot Shot	Shaggy
May 12	All for You	Janet Jackson
May 19	Survivor	Destiny's Child
May 26	Survivor	Destiny's Child
June 2	Lateralus	Tool
June 9	Break the Cycle	Staind
June 16	Break the Cycle	Staind
June 23	Amnesiac	Radiohead
June 30	Take Off Your Pants and Jacket	Blink-182
July 7	Devil's Night	D12
July 14	Devil's Night	D12
July 21	Devil's Night	D12
July 28	Devil's Night	D12
August 4	Devil's Night	D12
August 11	Celebrity	'N Sync
August 18	Celebrity	'N Sync
August 25	8701	Usher
September 1	Survivor	Destiny's Child
September 8	Survivor	Destiny's Child
September 15	Iowa	Slipknot
September 22	Toxicity	System of a Down
September 29	Silver Side Up	Nickelback
October 6	The Look of Love	Diana Krall
October 13	The Look of Love	Diana Krall
October 20	The Look of Love	Diana Krall
October 27	Now! 6	Various Artists
November 3	Now! 6	Various Artists
November 10	The Great Depression	DMX
November 17	The Hits: Chapter One	Backstreet Boys
November 24	Britney	Britney Spears
December 1	Big Shiny Tunes 6	Various Artists
December 8	Big Shiny Tunes 6	Various Artists
December 15	Big Shiny Tunes 6	Various Artists
December 22	Big Shiny Tunes 6	Various Artists
December 29	Big Shiny Tunes 6	Various Artists

== See also ==
- List of Canadian number-one singles of 2001
