= Becoming (2002 TV series) =

- Country of origin: United States

Production
- Running time: 30 minutes

Original release
- Network: MTV
- Release: 2002 – 2004

Becoming is a reality show produced by MTV. The concept of the show was to have a randomly picked fan of an artist reproduce a music video by the artist (based on submissions). It had a spinoff called Becoming Presents: Wannabe hosted by Christina Milian with support from Brian McFayden and Hilarie Burton among others.

The show was also broadcast on Canadian TV station MuchMusic.

The show was parodied by Canadian punk-rock band Not by Choice in the 2003 video for "Now That You Are Leaving".
