= Ignite (Econoline Crush album) =

Studio album by Econoline Crush
- Released: January 15, 2008
- Recorded: July 24 – October 12, 2007; RadioStar Studios; Weed, California
- Genre: Alternative rock, industrial rock
- Label: FNN (independent label), distributed by Universal Music Group
- Producer: Sylvia Massy

Econoline Crush chronology
Brand New History (2001)	Ignite (2008)

Ignite is the fourth full-length album by the industrial rock band Econoline Crush. It was recorded from July 24, 2007, to October 12, 2007, and released on the independent label FNN on January 15, 2008. The album was distributed by Universal Music Group. The band re-enlisted producer Sylvia Massy for this album. Massy had previously produced the band's 1998 album The Devil You Know. Ignite is the first album with the band membership of Kai Markus on guitar, Scott Whalen on bass, Brent Fitz on drums and Trevor Hurst on vocals. The album was recorded at RadioStar Studios, owned by Massy, and located in the town of Weed, California.

The track "Get Out of the Way" was the goal song of the NHL's Edmonton Oilers during the 2009–2010 season.

== Track listing ==
1. "Could Have Been" - 2:41
2. "Dirty" - 3:08
3. "Psychotic" - 3:47
4. "Get Out of the Way" - 3:42
5. "Hole in My Heart" - 4:24
6. "Unbelievable" - 4:00
7. "The Love You Feel" - 4:05
8. "Heaven's Falling" - 3:31
9. "Burn It Down" - 2:50
10. "Bleed Through" - 3:35

Tracks 11 through 22 of the album are silent.

23. "You Don't Know What It's Like 2007" (hidden track) - 4:00

== Credits ==
- Sylvia Massy - executive producer, engineer, mixing
- Maor Appelbaum - mix assistant engineer, additional musician
- Joe Johnston - producer, engineer
- Matthew J. Doughty - producer, engineer, additional musician / FX
- Dave Watt - additional musician
- Tom Baker - mastering

== Personnel ==
- Trevor Hurst - vocals
- Kai Markus - guitar
- Scott Whalen - bass
- Brent Fitz - drums
