= Gimme Five (album) =

Album by The Killjoys

Studio album by The Killjoys
- Released: April 23, 1996
- Recorded: at Ardent Studios, Memphis, Tennessee
- Genre: Alternative rock, power pop
- Length: 36:29
- Label: Warner
- Producer: Rick Clark, The Killjoys

The Killjoys chronology
Starry (1994)	Gimme Five (1996)	Melos Modos (1998)

Singles from Gimme Five
- 1. "Rave + Drool" Released: 1996; 2. "Soaked" Released: 1996; 3. "Look Like Me" Released: 1996; 4. "Sick of You" Released: 1997

Gimme Five is the second album by the Canadian alternative rock band The Killjoys. It was released in 1996. The album was recorded at Ardent Studios in Memphis, Tennessee. The album featured the hit singles "Rave + Drool" and "Soaked", the latter which peaked at #20 on the Canadian singles chart. "Rave + Drool" appeared on the original Big Shiny Tunes compilation album.

== Track listing ==
All songs written by Mike Trebilcock, except where noted.

1. "Rave + Drool" – 4:02
2. "Like I Care" – 3:22
3. "Sick of You" – 3:31
4. "Like a Girl Jesus" (Scott Miller) – 2:55
5. "Soaked" – 3:16
6. "Spacegirl" (Gene Champagne) – 0:50
7. "Brand New Neighbour" – 2:47
8. "Look Like Me" – 2:54
9. "C-Monkey" – 3:03
10. "Everything" (Trebilcock, Champagne) – 2:52
11. "Grown up Scared" – 0:49
12. "Exit Wound" – 2:33
13. "Rec Room" – 3:35

== Personnel ==
- Mike Trebilcock – guitars, vocals
- Gene Champagne – drums, guitars, vocals on "Spacegirl"
- Shelley Woods – bass, vocals

=== Technical personnel ===
- Rick Clark – production
- The Killjoys – production
- Skidd Mills – engineering
- Matt Martone – additional engineering
- Jefferey Reid – additional engineering
- Tim Hevesi – additional production and engineering, mixing at Soho Common Recording House (tracks 1–5, 8, 10, 12, 13)
- Mike Trebilcock – mixing at Soho Common Recording House (tracks 1–5, 8, 10, 12, 13), recording and mixing in his bedroom (track 6), photography and illustrations, layout and design
- Terry Brown – mixing at Metalworks Studios (tracks 7, 9, 11)
- Bill Kipper – mastering at SNB, Montreal
- Peter Moore – digital editing (tracks 8, 10)
- Paul Sparrow – cover photography, layout and design
