= Snowcross =

Snowcross may refer to:

- Snowboard Cross, a type of snowboard racing where a group of people race to cross the finish line first
- Snocross, a type of cross country snowmobile racing on a short track
