= Sled Storm =

Sled Storm may refer to:

- Sled Storm (1999 video game), for PlayStation
- Sled Storm (2002 video game), for PlayStation 2
