= All That You Are =

All That You Are may refer to:

- "All That You Are" (Goo Goo Dolls song), 2011
- "All That You Are" (Econoline Crush song), 1997
- "All That You Are" (Mudvayne song), 2005
