= Secondhand Opinions =

Studio album by Not By Choice
- Released: 26 October 2004
- Genres: Punk rock Pop punk Alternative rock
- Label: Maple
- Producer: Murray Daigle

Not By Choice chronology
Maybe One Day (2002)	Secondhand Opinions (2004)	TBA

Secondhand Opinions is the second album by Canadian punk rock band Not by Choice, released on 26 October 2004. Days Go By and Call Out were released as singles, with the Days Go By music video featuring the band playing in the downtown Hamilton, Ontario GO Transit bus terminal and riding on the GO service coach bus.

== Track listing ==
1. "Out Of Reach (Too Far Gone)"
2. "Home"
3. "Call Out"
4. "Days Go By"
5. "So Close"
6. "Tongue Tied"
7. "Save Yourself"
8. "Never Say Goodbye"
9. "Here With Me"
10. "Wake Up"
11. "Echoes"
12. "Things Will Never Be The Same"
