= Big Shiny Tunes 4 =

Compilation album by Various artists
- Released: November 23, 1999
- Length: 68:29
- Label: EMI Music Canada

Various artists chronology
Big Shiny Tunes 3 (1998)	Big Shiny Tunes 4 (1999)	Big Shiny Tunes 5 (2000)

Big Shiny Tunes 4 is the fourth edition of the MuchMusic compilation series, Big Shiny Tunes. Like the previous edition of Big Shiny Tunes, fans were allowed to vote for which songs were to be on the album.

== Commercial performance ==
The album debuted at No. 2 in Canada, selling 77,167 copies in its first week. The album reached No. 1 on the chart the following week. During the Christmas week, the album sold 113,498 copies. The album was certified 8× Platinum (800,000 units) by the CRIA.

== Track listing ==
1. Lenny Kravitz - "American Woman" - (4:21)
2. Moist - "Breathe (TLA Mix)" - (4:46)
3. Sugar Ray - "Someday" - (4:02)
4. Matthew Good Band - "Hello Time Bomb" - (3:57)
5. Blink-182 - "What's My Age Again?" - (2:30)
6. Goo Goo Dolls - "Slide" - (3:32)
7. Fatboy Slim - "Praise You" - (5:22)
8. Kid Rock - "Bawitdaba" - (4:25)
9. Smash Mouth - "All Star" - (3:20)
10. The Tea Party - "Heaven Coming Down" - (4:00)
11. The Chemical Brothers - "Let Forever Be" - (3:55)
12. Orgy - "Blue Monday" - (4:25)
13. Red Hot Chili Peppers - "Scar Tissue" - (3:36)
14. I Mother Earth - "Summertime in the Void" - (4:57)
15. Silverchair - "Anthem for the Year 2000" - (4:07)
16. Serial Joe - "Mistake" - (3:08)
17. Econoline Crush - "You Don't Know What It's Like" - (4:06)
