= Snocross =

Winter sport

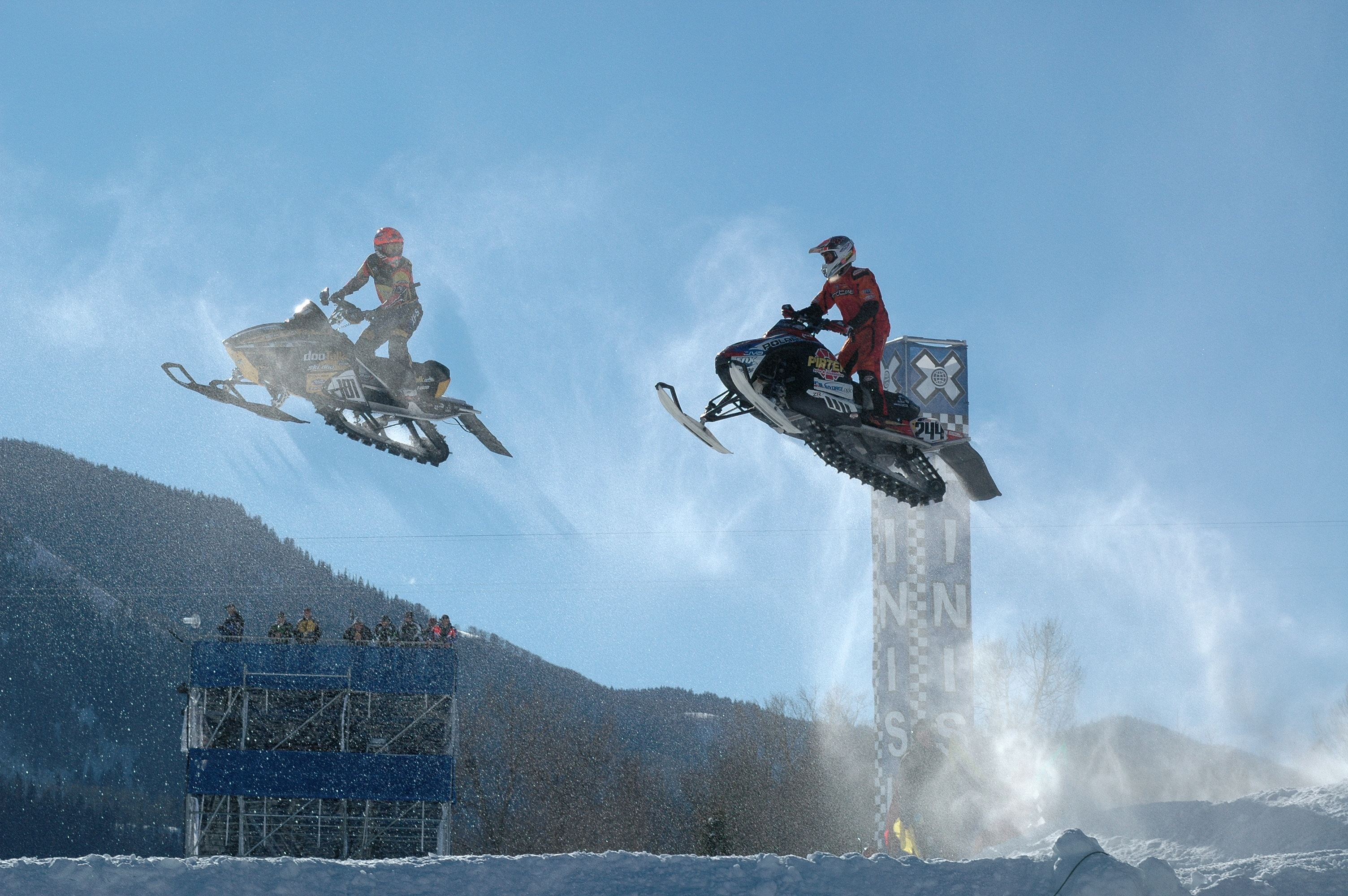
Snocross at the 2007 Winter X Games

Snocross (also snowcross) is a racing sport involving racing specialized high performance snowmobiles on natural or artificially-made tracks consisting of tight turns, banked corners, steep jumps and obstacles. Riders race at speed of up to 60 miles per hour (96 kilometres per hour). Jumps are up to 30 feet (9.1 meters) tall, so riders travel up to 130 feet (40 meters) before they touch the ground. According to the World Snowmobile Association which governs snocross, watercross, and hillcross racing, snocross is the most popular form of snowmobile racing.

Snocross was derived from the sport of motocross. The name is a portmanteau of the words "snowmobile" and "motocross". The sport uses a snowmobile instead of a motorcycle, and a snow/ice surface instead of dirt. The snow/ice surface which is either natural or man-made. Tracks are generally located in higher latitudes in the Northern Hemisphere since temperatures below freezing are required to maintain the frozen track surface. Motorcycle riders in motocross and supercross frequently compete in snocross in the winter.

Snocross became an event at the X Games in 1998. X Games is a popular gathering place for some snow-related sports in the United States. The course at the first snocross event at the X Games resembled a motocross course; it was significantly longer than courses are now. It had deeper holes and higher jumps that are now filled in with snow.

== Equipment ==
The snowmobiles vary significantly depending on their class. Sanctioning bodies are governed by International Snowmobile Racing (ISR) rules. Drivers are required to wear a helmet with a minimum of 50% International (Blaze) Orange. (Rule of thumb, a credit card placed anywhere on the helmet must contact orange), racing suit (must have a minimum of 144 square inches of orange on front and back), gloves, goggles/eye protection, leather boots, shin guards, elbow pads, neck braces, knee guards, and upper body protection (Motocross vests are NOT legal for Snocross. Hearing protection is often required in non-stock classes.

== Event ==
Races start with the drivers forming a line abreast at the start line. The event begins with either a drop of a green flag by the starter or by the starter turning on a light. Like other sports derived from cross country running, the winner is often the rider who has the best holeshot. The event may be stopped for a dangerous condition. The snowmobiles are lined up for the restart by their position in the race, with the drivers involved in the stoppage starting in the rear. The winner of the event is the rider who finishes first in the feature event. Events attract over 10,000 spectators.

Typically, a snocross event uses the standard short-track motorsport standard of qualifying rounds, heat races, consolation final, and the feature.

== Major events ==
- X Games, Buttermilk Mountain in Aspen, Colorado
- Duluth Nationals, Duluth, Minnesota. Held the weekend after Thanksgiving every year since its inception. The unofficial start to winter and the official kickoff to the Snocross racing season. Riders from New England, Canada and points beyond will join the ISOC teams in Duluth to get a jump on their upcoming seasons.
- Snowcross World Cup Finals at Lugnet Riksskid Stadium in Falun, Sweden
- Grand Prix Ski-doo de Valcourt in Valcourt, Quebec, Canada, in February.
- World Championship Snowmobile Derby at Eagle River, Wisconsin, United States on the third weekend in January. The snocross track is quite small yet still exciting and is constructed inside the famed high-banked half-mile ice oval.

== Snocross by region ==
=== United States ===
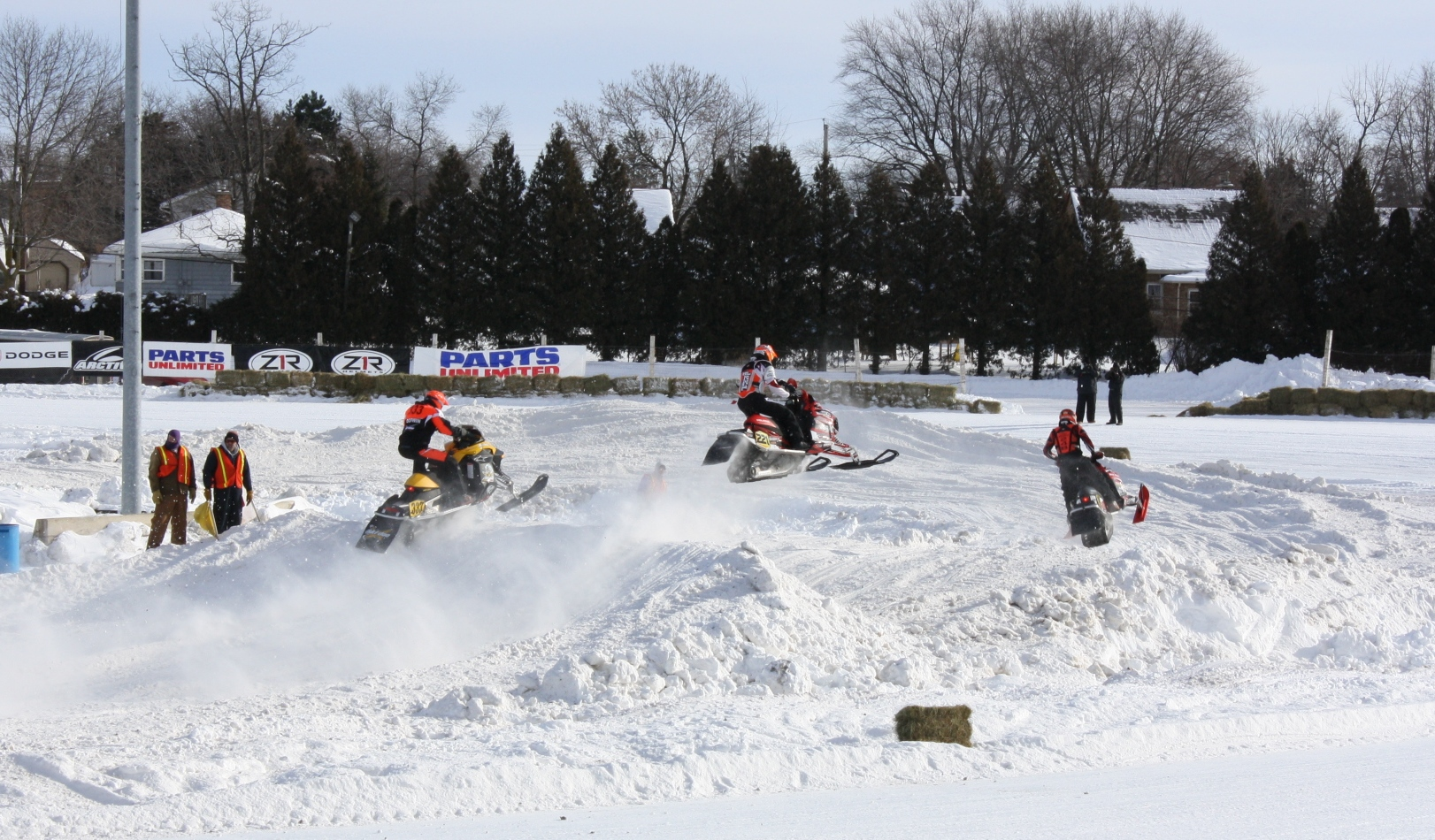
Snocross riders entering a corner

The national sanctioning body for snowmobile snocross racing is International Series of Champions (ISOC), owned by John Daniels. ISOC sanctions the AMSOIL Championship Snocross Series (ACS) national tour, along with regional series in Wisconsin, Minnesota, and Michigan. ISOC replaced Joe Duncan's World PowerSports Association (WPSA) starting with the 2008–09 season. The ACS will consist of eight points-paying races in 2015–16, beginning with the AMSOIL Duluth National at Spirit Mountain on November 27–29. Highlights from ISOC's National events are televised on the CBS Sports Network.

In the northeastern United States (New England and New York), Rock Maple Racing sanctioned snocross racing from the winter of 1991-92 until being sold (for the second time) in May 2010. New owners Eric Scott and Bob Roscoe chose to form the East Coast Snocross (ECS) series to carry on the tradition RMR had created. Now owned by Mass. native Kurt Gagne, East Coast Snocross (ISOC's eastern affiliate) will sanction eight points-paying events in 2019, along with one ice drag event. Previous years have seen hillcross events sanctioned as well. Snowmobile racing is big in northern New England where snows are deep and temperatures often remain cold for weeks. ECS races throughout New Hampshire, Maine, Massachusetts, Connecticut and New York.

Mountain West Racing sanctions on eight events in northern Rocky Mountains states. There is a snocross track in Wauconda, Illinois. It is home to the Winter Thunder Challenge snocross club, an ISOC affiliate, and they have to make snow to make up for the lack of natural snowfall.

=== Canada ===
The Canadian Snowcross Racing Association (CSRA) hosts 5.5 (five full weekends plus one one-day event) regional & regional plus one additional national-only points-paying events across Ontario and Quebec. Owned by veteran promoter Ken Avann, the CSRA is Canada's national tour. Despite being an ISR (the rules body) affiliate, CSRA technical rules differ for various classes, making competition between series' on either side of the border challenging for riders and crew.

The Quebec-based SCMX series normally sanctions eight events across Quebec.

The Ultimate Canadian Motorsports Association (UCMA) previously known as the North West Racing Association (NWRA) hosts 8 to 10 events in Central and Western Canada, with races held in the provinces of Alberta, Saskatchewan, Manitoba and north-west Ontario.

=== Europe ===
The sport is popular in the Nordic countries, especially in Sweden and Finland, yet its popularity is also growing in former Soviet Republics as well as Iceland and the Alps. There have been several manufacturers in earlier years, but Lynx - a subdivision of the Canadian company BRP, is the only producer left besides the big four; Yamaha, Polaris, Arctic Cat and Ski-Doo (also a BRP marque).

Racing is competed in several classes, but the most competitive ones are the Pro Stock and the Pro Open. Both are for a maximum of 600 cm^{3} and for adults at least 16 years old.

== Video games ==
- Polaris SnoCross – N64, PSone
- Ski-Doo: Snowmobile Challenge – Xbox 360, PS3
- Sled Storm – PSone, PS2
- Sno-Cross Championship Racing – PSone
- Ski-doo X-team Racing – PC
- Sno-Cross Extreme – PC
- X Games Snocross – iPhone/iPod Touch
- Mad Skills Snocross – iPhone/Android

== See also ==
- Motocross
- Snowmobile
