= Greg Williamson (drummer) =

Canadian drummer (born 1978)

- Born: August 13, 1978 (age 47)
- Origin: Regina, Saskatchewan, Canada
- Genres: Hard rock, heavy metal, alternative metal, punk, alternative rock, industrial rock, industrial metal, post-grunge, rockabilly, psychobilly, jazz, fusion
- Occupations: Drummer, session musician, songwriter, lyricist, vocalist
- Instruments: Drums, percussion, vocals
- Years active: 1993–present
- Formerly of: Tupelo Honey, Econoline Crush, Mourning Wood, The Raygun Cowboys, Cops + Robbers
- Website: http://www.tupelohoney.ca

Greg Williamson (born August 13, 1978) is a Canadian drummer, session musician, and songwriter. He is best known for his work with touring act Tupelo Honey, which is an original project started in 2003 in St. Albert, AB, Canada, where he resides. They have played with numerous acts including Bon Jovi, Default, Theory of a Deadman, Bif Naked, Three Days Grace, Thornley, The Trews, Billy Talent, and Sam Roberts. Williamson has also performed with bands such as Econoline Crush, Mourning Wood, The Raygun Cowboys, and Cops + Robbers. He does session work in Canada and abroad for other artists, such as Brian Melo on his record "Livin' It". He plays many musical styles.
