= Tomorrow Starts Today =

Studio album by Mobile
- Released: April 18, 2006
- Genre: Alternative rock
- Length: 46:09
- Label: Interscope
- Producer: Matt DeMatteo

Mobile chronology
Tomorrow Starts Today (2006)	Tales from the City (2008)

Professional ratings
Review scores
Source	Rating
AbsolutePunk	82%
Allmusic	3.5/5 stars
Jam!	3.5/5 stars
music-critic.ca	3/5 stars
PopMatters	5/10 stars
Redefine	B+
Uptown	B

Tomorrow Starts Today is the 2006 debut studio album by Canadian alternative rock band Mobile. It was released on April 18, 2006, in Canada and August 21, 2007, in the United States. Four singles were released from the album: "Montreal Calling" (2005), "Out of My Head" (2006), "See Right Through Me" (2006), and "Dusting Down the Stars" (2007). The first two singles were released before the album's release; as well, "Montreal Calling" was available in late 2005 as a track on MuchMusic's Big Shiny Tunes 10.

== Track listings ==
=== Canadian release ===
1. "Hands Tied" – 3:16
2. "New York Minute" – 3:27
3. "Out of My Head" – 3:36
4. "Montreal Calling" – 3:07
5. "See Right Through Me" – 4:15
6. "Lookin' Out" – 3:16
7. "Scars" – 3:55
8. "Dusting Down the Stars" – 4:07
9. "Tomorrow Starts Today" – 3:36
10. "How Can I Be Saved" – 3:06
11. "Lovedrug" – 4:12
12. "Bleeding Words" – 6:19

=== U.S. release ===
1. "Montreal Calling" – 3:07
2. "Tomorrow Starts Today" – 3:36
3. "Out of My Head" – 3:16
4. "See Right Through Me" – 3:27
5. "Dusting Down The Stars" – 3:36
6. "New York Minute" – 4:15
7. "Hand Tied" – 3:16
8. "Scars" – 3:55
9. "How Can I Be Saved" – 4:07
10. "Lookin' Out" – 3:06
11. "Lovedrug" – 4:12
12. "Bleeding Words" – 6:19

=== Pepsi Access Bundle release ===
1. "Out Of My Head (Claude Le Gauche remix)" - 4:13
2. "Scars" - 3:55
3. "See Right Through Me" - 3:27

=== Mini Card Sleeve release ===
1. "Tomorrow Starts Today" – 3:36
2. "See Right Through Me" – 3:27
3. "Bleeding Words" – 6:19
4. "Montreal Calling" – 3:07

== Personnel ==
Adapted credits from the liner notes of Tomorrow Starts Today.

Mobile

- Mat Joly – lead vocals, backing vocals, lyrics
- Christian Brais – guitars, keyboards, piano, percussion, pre-production, additional engineering
- Frank Williamson – guitars
- Dominic Viola – bass
- Pierre-Marc Hamelin – drums

Additional personnel

- Matt DeMatteo – production, engineering, guitars, keyboards, backing vocals
- Mark Stent – mixing
- Alex Dromgoole – assistant engineer
- David Emery – assistant engineer
- Tom Baker – mastering
- Mark Makoway – recording
- Nick Blagona – recording

== Certifications ==
Certifications for Tomorrow Starts Today
Region	Certification	Certified units/sales
Canada (Music Canada)	Gold	50,000^{^}
^{^} Shipments figures based on certification alone.
