= Sled Storm (2002 video game) =

- North American version cover art
- Developer: EA Canada
- Publisher: EA Sports BIG
- Directors: Stefan Posthuma; Heidi Ernest; Eric Lau
- Producers: Steven Rechtschaffner, Kirby Leung, Scott Speirs, Jules Burt, Conor Lumpkin
- Artists: Terry Chui, Nicholas Tay, Tony Lee, Clint Hanson, Tristan Brett, Gordon Durity, Tim McKenzie
- Platform: PlayStation 2
- Release: NA: March 12, 2002; PAL: March 22, 2002
- Genre: Racing
- Modes: Single-player, multiplayer

Sled Storm, sometimes mislabeled as Sled Storm 2, is a snowmobile racing video game for the PlayStation 2 developed by EA Canada and published by Electronic Arts under the EA Sports BIG label. Released in 2002, it is a sequel to the PlayStation game of the same name. The gameplay is more similar to SSX, even featuring characters from that series as playable guest characters.

== Gameplay ==
Sled Storm combines the ability to perform aerial tricks with arcade-style racing down a series of seven snow- and ice-covered courses. As in previous games branded under the EA Sports BIG name, performing tricks earns players points used to unlock characters and acquire speed boosts. The eight male and female characters have varying trick abilities and they each have distinct snowmobiles, or "sleds", individually rated in acceleration, top speed, handling, and stability. New sleds for each character can be earned by placing first on the majority of courses.

Modes of play include Single Race on any of the unlocked courses, Multi-Player for a split-screen challenge against a friend, Time Trial, Practice, Championship, and Rival Challenge. Championship is the primary mode which allows players to unlock courses, characters, and up to five classes of sleds. Each course is raced against five computer opponents in a series of three laps. Players need to finish in a specific position to advance to the next track or achieve a certain point total to unlock one of the characters (only three of which are initially playable). Once a character completes the Championship, the Rival Challenge mode is revealed.

Rival Challenge allows players an opportunity to win another character's sled by racing for it. If victorious in the one-on-one race, the player can add another sled type to a character's roster, otherwise the sled used in the one-on-one race is forfeited as collateral. To win back a lost sled, the player has to complete the same objective in the Championship mode. The computer randomly selects the course to ensure an even match for each Rival Challenge. Players can toggle the number of opponents and laps for non-Championship races, and unlocked courses, sleds, and characters can all be saved to memory card.

Sled Storm features a total of eight playable characters, including Tracey, who is technically the only returning character from the 1999 PlayStation game, and Zoe and Psymon from SSX.

== Reception ==
Reception

Aggregate score
Aggregator	Score
Metacritic	73/100

Review scores
Publication	Score
AllGame	3/5
Electronic Gaming Monthly	5.33/10
Eurogamer	6/10
Game Informer	7/10
GamePro	4/5
GameSpot	7.6/10
GameSpy	81%
GameZone	7/10
IGN	8.5/10
Official U.S. PlayStation Magazine	3.5/5

Reception of the game was positive. Some felt it expanded on the original Sled Storm and contained enough fresh content to be a worthy expansion of the game, while some others criticized the game for its lack of innovation. The game received "average" reviews according to the review aggregation website Metacritic.

Scott Alan Marriott of AllGame considered that the game offered "simple controls, fast action, and inventive courses with shortcuts so long they almost qualify as completely new tracks" and stated: "Sled Storm may not offer an avalanche of features or a gust of realism, but it won't leave thrill-seeking players, especially those burned by Arctic Thunder, out in the cold with its high-powered action".

Martin Taylor of Eurogamer was quite critical of the game and even claimed the game "never becomes really particularly interesting or unpredictable", adding that the game gradually becomes "ridiculous and occasionally downright frustrating"; he also criticized the design of the game, saying that the environments of the tracks "would be more suited to a game like Toon Car" and that "the more sensible tracks have some irritating quirks". He concluded the review: "What starts off to be a fun little arcade racer turns out to be a sadly wasted opportunity in the wake of far superior alternatives".

Giancarlo Varanini of GameSpot cited how "purists will undoubtedly become frustrated with Sled Storm's unrealistic AI and collision detection issues"; however, he later noted that, despite the problems with the game's mechanics, "it's still quite fun to drive through Sled Storm's unique tracks, which become progressively more insane as you go through the championship mode". He later claimed that "for the most part, Sled Storm looks a lot like SSX" and concluded: "Sled Storm uses the SSX formula well, and anyone who enjoys a challenging arcade-style racer should have fun with the game".

David Smith of IGN noted in the review that "EA's artists still have the touch when it comes to interface design, and Sled Storm carries off its over-the-top personality pretty well". He also saw the multiplayer as "great", the graphics "looking very good, with environments comparable to SSX", good rider animation and a solid frame rate in single-player and split-screen. Criticism towards the gameplay claimed it "isn't as integrated into the racing as in SSX", but he still felt the game was "great to drive". He later criticized the soundtrack, claiming it "doesn't seem to have as complex a mix as SSX" but later said it is "still a slickly-produced package". He ended the review saying that "in the end, it's still an evolution of the PlayStation game, rather than the revolution that was SSX".
