= The Devil You Know (Econoline Crush album) =

Studio album by Econoline Crush
- Released: June 17, 1997 (Canada); March 24, 1998 (US)
- Recorded: 1996–1997
- Studio: Sound City in Van Nuys, California
- Genre: Alternative rock, industrial rock
- Length: 44:10
- Label: EMI Music Canada/Restless
- Producer: Sylvia Massy

Econoline Crush chronology
Affliction (1995)	The Devil You Know (1997)	Brand New History (2001)

Alternative cover
- US release cover

Professional ratings
Review scores
Source	Rating
AllMusic	4/5 stars

The Devil You Know is an album by the industrial alternative rock band Econoline Crush. It was released in Canada in June 1997 by EMI, and in the United States in March 1998 by Restless Records. While they are still only popular in Canada for the most part, this album helped to increase Econoline Crush's exposure in the United States more than their previous album.

Tracks 12 through 22 of the album are silent; track 23 consists of a Biblical passage (I Corinthians 13:4-8) recited in Japanese.

== Touring and promotion ==
Econoline Crush spent a year on the road supporting the record. They performed with artists such as Green Day, Foo Fighters, The Tea Party, Alice Cooper, and Kiss. When opening for Kiss in Edmonton during their 1997 reunion tour, the band were left devastated when the crowd of 18,000 started chanting "We want Kiss" only a few songs into their set.

== Appearances in other media ==
Remixes of "Sparkle and Shine", "Nowhere Now", and "Surefire" were featured in the PlayStation game Sled Storm. "All That You Are" was used in the pilot episode of Sci-Fi Channel's Being Human.

== Reception ==
Greg Prato of AllMusic called The Devil You Know "their best album yet." He commented that "It could very well prove to be their big U.S. breakthrough (they're already stars in Canada)" and believed the music on the album was characterized by "buzzing guitars, frenetic drumming, vocals that alternate between sung and screamed, and subtle electronic experiments."

== Track listing ==
All songs by Trevor Hurst, Robbie Morfitt and Daniel Yaremko except as noted.

No.	Title	Writer(s)	Length
1.	"Surefire"		3:35
2.	"Sparkle And Shine"		3:42
3.	"Deeper"		3:17
4.	"Hollowman"		3:31
5.	"Home"		3:11
6.	"The Devil You Know"		4:26
7.	"All That You Are (X3)"	T. Hurst, R. Morfitt, R. Wagner, D. Sigmond, D. Binns	3:41
8.	"Burnt"		4:04
9.	"Haven't Gone Away"		3:46
10.	"Elegant"	T. Hurst, R. Morfitt, R. Wagner, D. Sigmond, D. Binns	3:39
11.	"Razorblades and Bandaides"	T. Hurst, R. Morfitt, R. Wagner, D. Sigmond, D. Binns	5:42
12.	Untitled		0:04
13.	Untitled		0:04
14.	Untitled		0:04
15.	Untitled		0:04
16.	Untitled		0:04
17.	Untitled		0:04
18.	Untitled		0:04
19.	Untitled		0:04
20.	Untitled		0:04
21.	Untitled		0:04
22.	Untitled		0:04
23.	Untitled (hidden track)		0:52

Tracks 12 through 22 of the album are silent; track 23 consists of a Biblical passage (I Corinthians 13:4-8) recited in Japanese.

The Japanese version of the CD includes 2 bonus tracks, "Home (Remix)" and "Wicked".

== Chart performance (singles) ==
Year	Title	Chart	Peak position
1998	"Home"	US Mainstream Rock Tracks	35
1998	"Surefire (Never Enough)"	US Mainstream Rock Tracks	18
1999	"All That You Are (X3)"	US Modern Rock Tracks	28

== Certifications ==
Region	Certification	Certified units/sales
Canada (Music Canada)	Platinum	100,000^{^}
^{^} Shipments figures based on certification alone.

== Personnel ==
- Trevor Hurst - vocals
- Robbie Morfitt - guitars
- Ziggy - guitars
- Robert Wagner - drums & percussion
- Don Binns - bass & acoustic guitar
- Ken Fleming - live bass
- Statik - programming
