= Out of My Head (Mobile song) =

Single by Mobile

from the album Tomorrow Starts Today
- Released: February 2006
- Genre: Alternative rock
- Length: 3:36
- Label: Interscope
- Songwriters: Brais, Dematteo, Joly

Mobile singles chronology
"Montreal Calling" (2006)	"Out of My Head" (2006)	"See Right Through Me" (2006)

"Out of My Head" is song by Canadian alternative rock band Mobile. It was released in February 2006 as the second single from their debut album Tomorrow Starts Today. The song reached number 6 in Canada.

== MuchMusic Countdown ==
The music video reached number one on MuchMusic's Countdown in May 2006. The video fell down the countdown list after reaching number-one, but managed to reach number-one again in July 2006. This was a feat never achieved before on MuchMusic. Due to the video reclimbing the charts, Mobile set the record for the most weeks spent on the Countdown with a single video, at 22. It was the band's first number one video after "Montreal Calling" reached the top five in January of that year.

== Chart positions ==
Chart (2006)	Peak position
Canada (Canadian Singles Chart)	6
Canada CHR/Pop Top 30 (Radio & Records)	5
Canada Hot AC Top 30 (Radio & Records)	5
Canada Rock Top 30 (Radio & Records)	11
