= Brand New History =

Studio album by Econoline Crush
- Released: March 20, 2001 (CAN); May 15, 2001 (US)
- Recorded: 2000
- Studio: Metalworks Studios in Mississauga, Ontario
- Genres: Alternative rock, industrial rock
- Length: 42:49
- Label: EMI Music Canada/Restless
- Producers: Bob Rock (tracks 1 & 12); John Travis (tracks 2–11)

Econoline Crush chronology
The Devil You Know (1997)	Brand New History (2001)	Ignite (2008)

Professional ratings
Review scores
Source	Rating
Allmusic	link

Brand New History is the third full-length album by the Canadian industrial alternative rock band Econoline Crush. It was released in 2001 by Restless Records.

For this album, the band enlisted producers Bob Rock (Metallica, Mötley Crüe, Aerosmith) and DJ Swamp (Beck) to help them produce a more accessible blend of their trademark industrial rock and a more pop-oriented sound.

== Track listing ==
1. "Make It Right" - 3:30
2. "Flamethrower" - 3:57
3. "Trash" - 2:49
4. "By the Riverside" - 4:01
5. "Digging the Heroine" - 3:34
6. "Go Off" - 2:55
7. "Sinking" - 3:32
8. "May I Go" - 3:31
9. "My Salvation" - 3:34
10. "Here and There" - 3:41
11. "Tomorrow Starts Today" - 3:39
12. "You Don't Know What It's Like" - 4:06

On promotional versions of the album, "You Don't Know What It's Like" is track three, moving all songs after it down a track.

== Personnel ==
- Trevor Hurst - vocals
- Ziggy - guitar
- Johnny Haro - drums
- Dan Yaremko - bass/additional programming
