= Big Shiny Tunes 5 =

Compilation album by Various artists
- Released: November 28, 2000
- Length: 71:13
- Label: WEA (Canada)

Various artists chronology
Big Shiny Tunes 4 (1999)	Big Shiny Tunes 5 (2000)	Big Shiny Tunes 6 (2001)

"Big Shiny Tunes 5" is the fifth edition of the MuchMusic compilation series, Big Shiny Tunes. The album contains six songs that reached #1 on Canada's Rock chart in 2000 ("Bent", "Load Me Up", "Kryptonite", "Take a Picture", "Wonderful" and "Otherside"), more than any other Big Shiny Tunes album released before the chart's discontinuation.

== Commercial performance ==
Big Shiny Tunes 5 debuted at #2 on the Canadian Albums Chart, selling 68,899 copies in its first week. The album sold 79,657 copies the next week and 83,469 copies the week after. The album sold 424,393 copies by the end of 2000 and was the eighth best-selling album of the year in Canada. The album reached #1 on the Canadian Albums Chart in January, 2001. The album was certified 6× Platinum (600,000 units) by the CRIA.

== Track listing ==
No.	Title	Artist	Length
1.	"Bent"	Matchbox Twenty	4:18
2.	"Load Me Up"	Matthew Good Band	3:41
3.	"Kryptonite"	3 Doors Down	3:54
4.	"Sour Girl"	Stone Temple Pilots	4:15
5.	"The Bad Touch"	Bloodhound Gang	3:38
6.	"American Psycho"	Treble Charger	3:23
7.	"Take a Picture"	Filter	4:23
8.	"Wonderful"	Everclear	4:19
9.	"Adam's Song"	Blink-182	4:08
10.	"Re-Arranged"	Limp Bizkit	4:09
11.	"Teenage Dirtbag"	Wheatus	4:02
12.	"Otherside"	Red Hot Chili Peppers	4:15
13.	"Makes No Difference"	Sum 41	3:10
14.	"Change (In the House of Flies)"	Deftones	3:56
15.	"Stupify"	Disturbed	4:05
16.	"More"	J. Englishman	3:23
17.	"Only God Knows Why"	Kid Rock	4:15
18.	"Breathe"	Nickelback	3:59
Total length:			71:13
