= Tales from the City =

Studio album by Mobile
- Released: October 7, 2008
- Genre: Alternative rock
- Length: 44:49
- Label: Universal Music
- Producer: Jeffery Saltzman & Christian "Criq" Brais

Mobile chronology
Tomorrow Starts Today (2006)	Tales from the City (2008)

Professional ratings
Review scores
Source	Rating
CHARTattack	4/5 stars
The Tune	(C)

Tales from the City is the second studio album by Canadian alternative rock band Mobile. It was released on October 7, 2008, in Canada. The debut single from the album, "The Killer", was released on July 1, 2008.

The album was written and recorded in late 2007 and early 2008. The album's sound has some differences than Tomorrow Starts Today, Mobile's debut album. The songs in this album mesh together better than the previous album, for one. In July 2007 Christian's mother was diagnosed with breast cancer and some of the music in this album was inspired by that event. According to Mat the album "will show a different side of Mobile".

The opening track of Tales from the City, "Daylight Breaks", was actually written in 2000 and was not recorded until this album. Mobile considers the song "the perfect bridge between" Tomorrow Starts Today and Tales from the City.

Six of the songs from the album can be listened to on MTV's website. MTV has these songs available to listen to because the band was part of the leak live tour done by MTV from September 22 until October 6, 2008.

It debuted in the Canadian Album Charts at #26.

== Track listing ==
=== Canadian release ===
1. "Daylight Breaks" – 5:24
2. "Mother" – 4:14
3. "Hit the Floor #7" – 3:51
4. "The Killer" – 3:41
5. "No Tomorrow" – 3:55
6. "Gravity" – 4:46
7. "Slow Motion Car Crash" – 3:36
8. "Sweet Light" – 3:43
9. "Live to Find" – 3:57
10. "All Is Forgiven (Parts I-II-III)" – 7:42

=== American release ===
1. "Daylight Breaks" – 5:24
2. "Live to Find" – 3:43
3. "Hit the Floor #7" – 3:51
4. "The Killer" – 3:41
5. "No Tomorrow" – 3:55
6. "Gravity" – 4:46
7. "Slow Motion Car Crash" – 3:36
8. "Sweet Light" – 4:14
9. "Mother" – 3:57
10. "All Is Forgiven (Parts I-II-III)" – 7:42
11. "Dusting Down The Stars" - 4:05
12. "The Low Road ('B' Side)" - 4:16
13. "Don't Wait" - 4:29
14. "Electrolove" - 3:01

== Singles ==
- "The Killer" (2008) (#68, Canadian Hot 100)
