= Affliction (album) =

Studio album by Econoline Crush
- Released: March 21, 1995
- Recorded: September–December 1994
- Genre: Alternative rock
- Length: 51:06
- Label: EMI Canada; Nettwerk
- Producer: Rhys Fulber

Econoline Crush chronology
Purge (1994)	Affliction (1995)	The Devil You Know (1997)

Affliction is the first official full-length album by the industrial alternative rock band Econoline Crush. The Canadian release occurred in 1995 by EMI Music Canada and the American release occurred in 1996 by Nettwerk Records.

== Background ==
After Econoline Crush released the EP Purge in 1994, the band went on tour and started work on a proper full-length album. At that point, the lineup consisted of founding members vocalist Trevor Hurst, guitarist Robbie Morfitt, and bassist Dan Yaremko, in addition to drummer Gregg Leask and guitarist Hack (who both joined prior to the recording of Purge), plus keyboardist Chris Bryant (who joined after the recording of Purge).

While recording Affliction, both Hack and Bryant departed from the band, although Bryant contributed songwriting to multiple tracks. The album was recorded throughout the last four months of 1994. "Cruel World" in particular was the last song recorded, in December of that year. It was the third time that the song appeared on a release by the band. In addition, both "Wicked" and "Lost" were re-recordings of songs that the band previously created earlier in their career; thus, founding member Tom Ferris (who departed in 1993 alongside other founding member Chris Meyers) received writing credits for both tracks.

In 1995, Affliction was released in Canada by EMI Music Canada. After touring throughout Canada and Europe, the band then embarked on a tour of the US. They were joined on the tour by additional guitarist Ziggy Sigmund and keyboardist Adam Percy. To coincide with the tour, Affliction was released in the US by Nettwerk Records. Ultimately, singles and videos were created for the tracks "Nowhere Now", "Wicked", and "Close".

== Reception ==
Professional ratings
Review scores
Source	Rating
AllMusic	3/5 stars

AllMusic's Vincent Jeffries suggested the album would only be enjoyed by "aggro-alternative completists" and should've been ignored by "fans left unenthused by the slew of post-Downward Spiral also-rans". He said the album "accents the more repetitive qualities of industrial- and pop-flavored alt-rock", resulting in an album which "is tuneful, if not entirely gratifying."

== Track listing ==
All tracks are written by Trevor Hurst, Robbie Morfitt, and Dan Yaremko, except where noted.

Affliction track listing
No.	Title	Writer(s)	Length
1.	"Nowhere Now"		4:18
2.	"Blunt"	Hurst; Morfitt; Yaremko; Chris Bryant	3:56
3.	"Wicked"	Hurst; Morfitt; Yaremko; Tom Ferris	3:58
4.	"Emotional Stain"		6:19
5.	"Close"	Hurst; Morfitt; Yaremko; Bryant	4:45
6.	"Blood in the River"		4:10
7.	"Cruel World"	Hurst; Yaremko	4:11
8.	"Lost"	Hurst; Morfitt; Yaremko; Ferris	5:03
9.	"Slug"		4:32
10.	"Sycophant"		4:12
11.	"Affliction"	Hurst; Bryant	5:42
Total length:			51:06

== Personnel ==
Econoline Crush

- Dan Yaremko – bass
- Trevor Hurst – vocals
- Robbie Morfitt – guitar
- Gregg Leask – drums

Additional personnel

- Rhys Fulber – production, keyboards, programming
- Greg Reely – mixing
- Endre Lukacsy – mixing assistant
- Bob Ludwig – mastering
- Ray Fulber – technical support
