= Big Shiny Tunes 2 =

Compilation album by Various artists
- Released: December 2, 1997
- Length: 66:22
- Label: WEA

Various artists chronology
Big Shiny Tunes (1996)	Big Shiny Tunes 2 (1997)	Big Shiny Tunes 3 (1998)

Professional ratings
Review scores
Source	Rating
Allmusic	4.5/5 stars

Big Shiny Tunes 2 is the second edition of the MuchMusic compilation series, Big Shiny Tunes. The album had been accompanied by heavy advertising in Canada. It is the best-selling album of the series, having sold 1,233,000 copies.

== Commercial performance ==
Big Shiny Tunes 2 debuted at #1 on the Canadian Albums Chart, with 128,000 units sold in its first week. It ended up being the third best-selling album of 1997 in Canada, despite being on sale for less than a month of the year. By March 1998, the album was certified Diamond by the CRIA for sales of 1 million units.

Big Shiny Tunes 2 went on to sell 1,233,000 copies before going out of print. Despite being out of print, Big Shiny Tunes 2 is still the fourth best-selling album ever in Canada of the Nielsen SoundScan era as of 2020.

== Track listing ==
1. The Prodigy - "Breathe (Edit)"
2. Blur - "Song 2"
3. Third Eye Blind - "Semi-Charmed Life"
4. Smash Mouth - "Walkin' on the Sun"
5. Sugar Ray - "Fly" (featuring Super Cat)
6. Bran Van 3000 - "Drinking in L.A."
7. Marilyn Manson - "The Beautiful People"
8. Holly McNarland - "Numb"
9. Bush - "Swallowed"
10. Matchbox 20 - "Push"
11. Collective Soul - "Precious Declaration (Remix)"
12. The Tea Party - "Temptation (Edit) (Tom Lord-Alge Mix)"
13. The Chemical Brothers - "Block Rockin' Beats (Radio Edit)"
14. Wide Mouth Mason - "My Old Self"
15. Radiohead - "Paranoid Android"
16. The Age of Electric - "Remote Control"
17. Stone Temple Pilots - "Lady Picture Show"

== See also ==
- List of diamond-certified albums in Canada
