= Purge (EP) =

EP by Econoline Crush
- Released: May 3, 1994
- Genre: Alternative rock, industrial rock
- Label: EMI Music Canada

Econoline Crush chronology
The Purge Demo (1993)	Purge (1994)	Affliction (1995)

Professional ratings
Review scores
Source	Rating
Allmusic	link

Purge is the major label debut by the Canadian industrial alternative rock band Econoline Crush. It was released in 1994 by EMI Music Canada, and the following year it garnered the band a nomination for a Juno Award.

Initially in 1993, an EP titled The Purge Demo was self-released by the band (with H.M.G. as the management entity). It features a different tracklisting and a slightly altered lineup from the 1994 Purge release.

== Background ==
The Purge Demo is the band's only release to feature original members Chris Meyers and Tom Ferris, although the latter received songwriting credits on the band's two subsequent releases. The Purge Demo features eight songs. Despite "demo" in its name, only two of the songs were re-recorded for the official release of Purge: "T.D.M." and "Cruel World". Two other songs off of The Purge Demo, "Lost" and "Wicked", were eventually re-recorded for Econoline Crush's 1995 album Affliction (in addition to "Cruel World" for a third time). The remaining four songs on The Purge Demo remained exclusive to the release: "This Abyss", "C.D.I.D.", "Something", and "Deep Down". The songs on The Purge Demo were pulled from various recording sessions in 1992, primarily with Ferris' equipment. Some of the songs were recorded on a 16-track Alesis.

Afterwards, the band signed to EMI and they released Purge as their official debut in 1994, with Gregg Leask and Hack joining the lineup. Purge is the band's only release to feature Hack as he left the band after the supporting tours. On Purge, "Pssyche" is a Killing Joke cover. The original song initially appeared on Killing Joke's "Wardance" single in 1980. Rhys Fulber, known for his work with Front Line Assembly and Fear Factory, provided keyboards and programming as a studio musician. Vocalist Trevor Hurst considered Purge an "introductory EP" since it was only recorded in roughly a week. The EP ultimately gave the band something to tour behind upon their signing to the EMI label.

== Track listing ==
No.	Title	Writer(s)	Length
1.	"Purge I"	Trevor Hurst, Dan Yaremko, Robbie Morfitt, Gregg Leask, Mike Gallagher	1:33
2.	"Out of Reach"	Hurst, Morfitt, Tom Ferris	4:50
3.	"T.D.M."	Hurst, Ferris	4:49
4.	"Cruel World"	Hurst, Yaremko	3:45
5.	"Pssyche"	Jaz Coleman, Geordie Walker, Paul Ferguson, Martin Glover	4:57
6.	"Purge II"	Hurst, Yaremko, Morfitt, Leask, Gallagher	2:00

== Track listing (The Purge Demo) ==
No.	Title	Writer(s)	Length
1.	"Cruel World"	Hurst, Yaremko	3:54
2.	"Lost"	Hurst, Yaremko, Morfitt, Ferris	5:06
3.	"T.D.M."	Hurst, Ferris	4:12
4.	"This Abyss"	Hurst, Ferris	4:37
5.	"C.D.I.D."	Hurst, Ferris	4:21
6.	"Wicked"	Hurst, Yaremko, Morfitt, Ferris	5:17
7.	"Something"	Hurst, Ferris, Chris Meyers	4:04
8.	"Deep Down"	Hurst, Ferris, Meyers	4:25

== Personnel ==
Econoline Crush

- Trevor Hurst – vocals
- Robbie Morfitt – guitar
- Dan Yaremko – bass
- Gregg Leask – drums
- Mike "Hack" Gallagher – guitar
- Tom Ferris – keyboards, guitar, programming (The Purge Demo)
- Chris Meyers – drums, keyboards, programming (The Purge Demo)

Additional personnel

- Rhys Fulber – keyboards, programming
- Dale Penner – production, engineering, mixing
- Noel Golden – mixing
- Jason Mauza – engineering
- Delwyn Brooks – engineering
- Eddie Schreyer – mastering
