= Starry (The Killjoys album) =

Studio album by The Killjoys
- Released: December 1994
- Genre: Alternative rock, power pop
- Length: 32:41
- Label: Cargo Records, Warner
- Producer: Tim Hevesi, The Killjoys

The Killjoys chronology
| Starry (1994) | Gimme Five (1996) |

Singles from Starry
- 1. "Today I Hate Everyone" Released: 1995; 2. "Dana" Released: 1995; 3. "Anyday Now" Released: 1995

Starry is the debut album by the Canadian alternative rock band, The Killjoys. The album was recorded at the Soho Common Recording House in Hamilton, Ontario and was released in 1994. "Today I Hate Everyone", "Dana", and "Any Day Now" were released as singles. Originally independently released, the album sold 20,000 copies before the band signed with WEA Canada, who re-released the album with tracks 1, 5, 7 & 8 remixed by Terry Brown.

== Track listing ==
All songs written by Mike Trebilcock, except where noted.

1. "Today I Hate Everyone" – 2:16
2. "Ungowa, Baby!" – 4:17
3. "If I Were You" – 2:43
4. "Candyland" – 3:23
5. "Dana" – 2:20
6. "Monkeysucker" – 1:08
7. "Sally Won't" – 2:49
8. "Any Day Now" – 2:43
9. "Low" – 5:22
10. "Headlong" (Trebilcock, Gene Champagne) – 3:15
11. "Someplace" – 2:04

== Personnel ==
- Mike Trebilcock – guitar, vocals
- Gene Champagne – drums
- Shelley Woods – bass

=== Technical personnel ===
- Tim Hevesi – production, engineering
- The Killjoys – production
- Mark S. Berry – additional production, mixing (tracks 2–4, 6, 9–11)
- Terry Brown – mixing at Metalworks Studios (tracks 1, 5, 7, 8)
- Brad Nelson – additional engineering
- Ed Krautner – additional engineering
- Howie Weinberg – mastering at Masterdisk (tracks 2–4, 6, 9–11)
- Peter Moore – mastering at the E-Room (tracks 1, 5, 7, 8)
- Antoine Moonen – cover design
- Mike Trebilcock – cover design
