= Big Shiny Tunes 3 =

Compilation album by Various artists
- Released: December 1, 1998
- Length: 71:48
- Label: EMI Music Canada

Various artists chronology
| Big Shiny Tunes 2 (1997) | Big Shiny Tunes 3 (1998) | Big Shiny Tunes 4 (1999) |

"Big Shiny Tunes 3" is the third edition of the MuchMusic compilation series, Big Shiny Tunes. The album was assembled by having its audience vote on which songs they would like to have included, a novel process.

== Commercial performance ==
The album debuted at #1 on the Canadian Albums Chart, selling 112,000 copies in its first week. During the week of Christmas, the album sold 138,661 copies. The album was certified 8× Platinum (800,000 units) by the CRIA.

== Track listing ==
1. The Smashing Pumpkins – "Ava Adore" – 4:20
2. Fastball – "The Way" – 4:16
3. Foo Fighters – "My Hero" – 4:20
4. Matthew Good Band – "Apparitions (edit)" – 4:00
5. Semisonic – "Closing Time" – 4:38
6. Barenaked Ladies – "One Week" – 2:52
7. Beastie Boys – "Three MC's and One DJ" – 2:50
8. Rob Zombie – "Dragula (The Hot Rod Herman Mix)" – 4:30
9. Third Eye Blind – "How's It Going to Be" – 4:14
10. Sloan – "Money City Maniacs" – 3:53
11. Lenny Kravitz – "Fly Away" – 3:41
12. Placebo – "Pure Morning" – 3:52
13. Garbage – "Push It" – 4:01
14. Radiohead – "Karma Police" – 4:20
15. Goo Goo Dolls – "Iris" – 4:52
16. Big Wreck – "That Song" – 5:04
17. Monster Magnet – "Space Lord" – 5:55
