= Tupelo Honey (band) =

Canadian rock band

- Origin: St. Albert, Alberta, Canada
- Genres: Rock; Pop punk Post-grunge
- Years active: 2003–2015, 2025
- Label: None
- Members: Steve Vincent; Dan Davidson; Tyler Dianocky; Greg Williamson; Brad Simons
- Past members: Matthew Landry
- Website: tupelohoney.ca

Tupelo Honey was a Canadian rock band formed in St. Albert, Alberta, Canada, in February 2003. They have played with numerous headlining acts such as Bon Jovi, Default, Theory of a Deadman, Bif Naked, Three Days Grace, Thornley, The Trews, Billy Talent, and Sam Roberts.

== History ==
=== Formation ===
The members of Tupelo Honey met while enrolled in a music program at Grant MacEwan College in Edmonton, Alberta, Canada.

Prior to forming Tupelo Honey, the band members gained experience playing in bands of varied musical genres; Tyler Dianocky played in a world music band that focused on instrumental music, Dan Davidson played in an Indie rock / punk band, Matt Landry sang in numerous rock bands and Greg Williams and Steve Vincent played together in a jazz-infused cover band. These diverse musical backgrounds lend to Tupelo Honey's sound, which ranges from hard rock to mid-tempo acoustic.

Tyler Dianocky (guitar), Dan Davidson (guitar), Greg Williamson (Drums), and Steve Vincent (bass) first played together in a folk music band for paying shows before meeting Matt Landry (vocals) through mutual friends, after watching him perform solo. Folk music was a dramatic deviation from their preferred genre – rock.

Needing a name to enter a music contest, they selected Tupelo Honey – the title of Matt Landry's father's favourite song. The name was meant to be temporary; however, after winning the music contest and gaining fans who identified the band as Tupelo Honey, the name remained.

=== Self-titled EP and September Sessions EP (2003–2007) ===
Tupelo Honey played their debut show Stage 13 in Camrose, Alberta, to an audience of over 5,000 people and was preceded on stage by Our Lady Peace.

In July 2007, Tupelo Honey performed for a crowd of over 13,000, opening for Bon Jovi at both Edmonton, Alberta's Rexall Place and Calgary, Alberta's Saddledome.

In 2005, Tupelo Honey won Canadian Music Week's Xtreme Bandslam Competition beating out Vancouver's State of Shock. Their prize included 30 hours of recording at Metalworks Studios and a $5,000 National Radio Promotion and Publicity Package.

In 2006, Tupelo Honey won the regional title in the Canadian Radio Star National Songwriting Competition with their song "Screaming".

=== Machines and Robots EP (2008–present) ===
The Machines and Robots EP was released on April 15, 2008. The album's title refers to the extensive use of technology employed in recording the album; for example, Dan Davidson recorded some of the guitar tracks from his home and emailed them to the producer.

The album was produced by Jeff Dalziel (Thornley, Edwin), who also co-wrote the EP's second single, "We Are". While producing and recording Machines and Robots, Jeff Dalziel was also producing Canadian Idol Brian Melo's debut album Livin' It; Tupelo Honey was hired to play sessions on Melo's album.

"Morphine" was the first single released from Machines and Robots. The promotional music video for "Morphine" was shot over the course of a day in a white-walled room half the size of a kitchen, and the graphic-novel style effects were added later in post-production. Aside from the band members, only three crew members and a camera operator were on set. Blatant Films, an animation company in Vancouver, British Columbia, produced the music video and created the animations. The "Morphine" video won "Best Music Video" of 2008 at the prestigious Leo Awards, celebrating the best in BC's Film and Television Industry

"Not Alone", the second video from "Machines and Robots", also produced by Blatant Films, features the band members bruised and battered, headed out to the country in an old classic 1966 Buick Electra. Once outside the city, the band members "heal" both physically and metaphorically before returning to the city at sunset. "Not Alone" was also nominated for "Best Video" at the Leo Awards.

Once 2010 came, Tupelo Honey's frontman Matt Landry parted ways with the band. According to the band's homepage, it was apparently "not possible to move forward in any fashion, what so ever given the situation." Matt apparently wanted a more serious solo career and found the band a good time but realized the band was not what his passion was, which is obviously not the real story but works as a generally neutral statement that avoids any follow-up questions. Backup singer Dan Davidson has since taken the new role of lead vocalist. Although Dan took the lead role seriously the band would never capture the Landry sound. They have returned to the studio to record their first full-length album, and have released a new single, "Best I Could", which can be heard on the band's Myspace page, and downloaded on their website.

Greg and Steve were recently touring with Econoline Crush in 2010.

Edmonton guitarist Brad Simons was added to the lineup to play guitar, now that Dan is the full-time singer of the band.

The band has been largely inactive since 2015 after Dan Davidson launched his solo career as a country singer.

In 2025, Tupelo Honey reunited for 100.3 The Bear's 31st Annual Halloween Howler for one show only on Halloween night.

=== Exposure ===
Tupelo Honey has been featured on many prominent radio programs and shows, including the acclaimed Unsigned program on Humber College's 96-9 FM station. In 2008, they were featured in a mini documentary conducted and produced by Crystal Perin.

== Musical approach ==
In the past, Tupelo Honey has written and recorded their new material in Toronto, Ontario, Canada. Contrasting numerous other bands that employ the use of a principal songwriter, Tupelo Honey take a collaborative approach to song writing. The band splits into writing groups to develop songs. Once the songs begin to take form, the band members will play together to complete the song.

Despite numerous offers from record labels, Tupelo Honey choose to remain as an independent band. This can be a disadvantage in terms of commercial success, as radio program directors are often hesitant to play independent artists.

Opting out of label requirements allows Tupelo Honey to record and release EPs on a semi-regular basis. This style of album release results in a positive experience for the band's fans; fans have a shorter time to wait between albums and the album tracks comprise the band's strongest material. Utilizing a cycle of recording in September, preparing album promotions during the winter and touring during the spring and summer months, Tupelo Honey is able to accommodate both tour schedules and releasing new material in a relatively short time period.

== Discography ==
=== Albums ===
- Tupelo Honey EP (Released November 1, 2006)
1. "Why I Bother" - 3:31
2. "Yesterday" - 3:15
3. "Then Came You" - 3:47
4. "Left Behind" - 3:31
5. "See Through Shadow" - 5:13
6. "Feel" - 3:13
- September Sessions EP (Released April 2, 2007)
1. "Because of You" - 3:05
2. "Make Me Believe" - 4:29
3. "Screaming" - 3:13
4. "Envy" - 2:51
5. "Epic" - 3:44
- Machines & Robots EP (Released April 8, 2008)
1. "Morphine" - 3:38
2. "All These Things" - 3:44
3. "Not Alone" - 4:02
4. "We Are" - 3:08
5. "Machines and Robots" - 4:07
- Caught Up in the Excess LP (Released March 8, 2011)
1. "Pull Me Closer" - 3:51
2. "Falling" - 3:35
3. "One Step" - 3:17
4. "Best I Could" - 3:49
5. "Reason" - 3:46
6. "Moment" - 4:26
7. "What Are You Waiting For" - 3:15
8. "Hollow" - 3:09
9. "Last Thing" - 4:03
10. "Morphine (Acoustic Version)" - 3:48
11. "Not Alone (Acoustic Version)" - 4:08
12. "We Are (Acoustic Version)" - 3:30
13. "Epic (Acoustic Version)" - 4:02
14. "Because Of You (Acoustic Version)" - 4:18
15. "Screaming (Acoustic Version)" - 4:07
16. "Last Thing (Acoustic Version)" - 4:25
17. "The Laughing Song (Hidden Track)" - 1:27

=== Singles ===
Year	Song	Chart peak	Album
Year	Song	CAN Rock	Album
2011	"Pull Me Closer"	35	Caught Up in the Excess
2012	"Last Thing"	32	Caught Up in the Excess
"—" denotes a release that did not chart.

== Music videos ==
Year	Title	Director	Producer
2005	"Why I Bother"	Chris Halmo	Mike Maxxis
2007	"Make Me Believe"	Jeff Dalziel/Dan Davidson	Jeff Dalziel
2008	"Morphine"	Jon Busby	Blatant Films Inc.
2009	"Not Alone"	Jon Busby	Blatant Films Inc.
2011	"Falling"	Jeremy Brown	Rattlesnake Films
