= Maybe One Day =

Studio album by Not By Choice
- Released: 3 September 2002
- Genres: Punk rock Pop punk
- Length: 40:34
- Label: Linus Entertainment
- Producer: John Whynot

Not By Choice chronology
Maybe One Day (2002)	Secondhand Opinions (2004)

Maybe One Day is the debut album of Canadian punk rock band Not by Choice, released on September 3, 2002. Standing All Alone (featured in Big Shiny Tunes 7) and Now That You Are Leaving (featured in Big Shiny Tunes 8) were the two singles released from this album with the two consecutive singles videos taking place on a yacht with a beauty contest taking place and a parody of MTV reality show Becoming which was on the air at the time which reached #11 on the MuchMusic Countdown and won the 2003 Much Music Video Award for Independent Video of the Year. The album debuted at #47 on the Canadian Albums Chart. The album won the CASBY Award for "Favourite New Indie Release".

== Track listing ==
No.	Title	Length
1.	"Maybe One Day"	3:40
2.	"Standing All Alone"	2:51
3.	"Now That You Are Leaving"	3:26
4.	"Wish Upon a Star"	3:27
5.	"Make My Day"	2:47
6.	"This Is the End"	2:52
7.	"Intoxicated"	4:02
8.	"Miss You"	4:16
9.	"The Way It Used to Be"	4:00
10.	"Same as You"	3:25
11.	"This Old Place"	5:42

== Year-end charts ==
Chart (2002)	Position
Canadian Alternative Albums (Nielsen SoundScan)	174
