= The Killjoys (Canadian band) =

Canadian alternative rock band

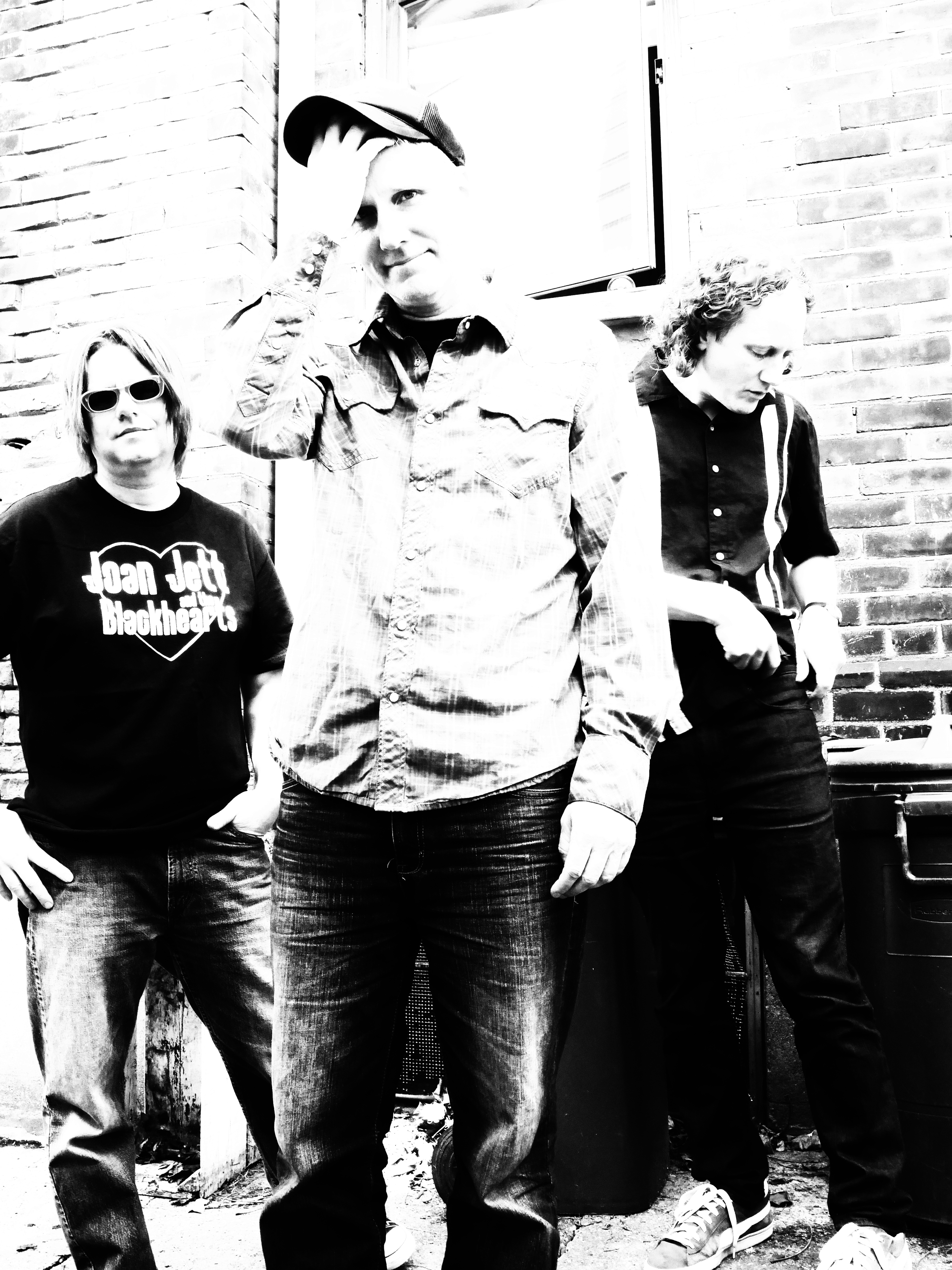
- The Killjoys in 2015

Background information
- Origin: Hamilton, Ontario, Canada
- Genres: Alternative rock, Power pop, Post-grunge
- Years active: 1992–1999, 2002, 2012, 2015–2017, 2022–present
- Label: Warner
- Members: Mike Trebilcock; Gene Champagne; Shelley Woods
- Website: thekilljoys.ca

The Killjoys is a Canadian alternative rock band who formed in 1992 in Hamilton, Ontario. The group enjoyed moderate success in Canada during the grunge/alternative rock heyday of the 1990s before disbanding in 1999. The band has reformed and disbanded on and off since 2002.

== History ==
The Killjoys released their debut album Starry in 1994 through Cargo Records. In late 1994, the band signed with Warner Music Canada, and Starry was later re-released. The singles "Today I Hate Everyone" and "Dana" were played on MuchMusic and MusiquePlus. Mike Trebilcock was nominated for a Juno Award with Antoine Moonen in 1994, for "Best Album Design" for Starry. The band was also nominated for a Rock Radio Award for "Independent Artist of the Year".

In 1996, the band released their second album, Gimme Five. The album's lead single, "Rave + Drool", was included on the very first Big Shiny Tunes compilation album. The band received a Juno Award for "Best New Group" in 1997.

In 1998, the band released their third album, Melos Modos. After filming a music video in Mexico for the album's lead single "I've Been Good", the film was stolen by a crew member. The crew member demanded $13,000, threatening to destroy the film otherwise. The ransom was paid and the footage was returned safely. By May 1999, Melos Modos had sold more than 32,000 units.

In 1999, The Killjoys signed to Shoreline Records. In April 1999, the band released a live album entitled Onenight and a Morningafter. That same month, the band toured across Eastern Canada with I Mother Earth and Finger Eleven on the Belvedere Rock tour. In 2000, lead singer/guitarist Mike Trebilcock released a solo album entitled Shield Millions. After three years of inactivity, The Killjoys reunited in 2002 for another performance. A "best of" compilation was released in 2005 called Essentials.

Gene Champagne formed Junior Achiever, and released "All the Little Letdowns" in 2008. His current band is The Unteens, and he is also the drummer for Canadian band Teenage Head.

Mike Trebilcock is a film composer, scoring such films as the award-winning 2021 horror/comedy, Crabs!, and The Fight Machine, an action/drama film directed by Andrew T. Hunt, based on The Fighter by Craig Davidson.

In 2011, The Killjoys were featured on a compilation entitled, "Today I Hate Everyone - Perfect Songs For A Crappy Day", alongside The Ramones, Ween, and Hüsker Dü.

In March 2015, The Killjoys reunited for a show in Hamilton that coincided with the Juno Awards being held there that month. The band played a few more shows over the next two years, after which bassist Shelley Woods quit the band and the band decided to break up again.

In 2022, The Killjoys reunited again, performing their first show since 2017 on October 1, 2022, at the Horseshoe Tavern in Toronto.

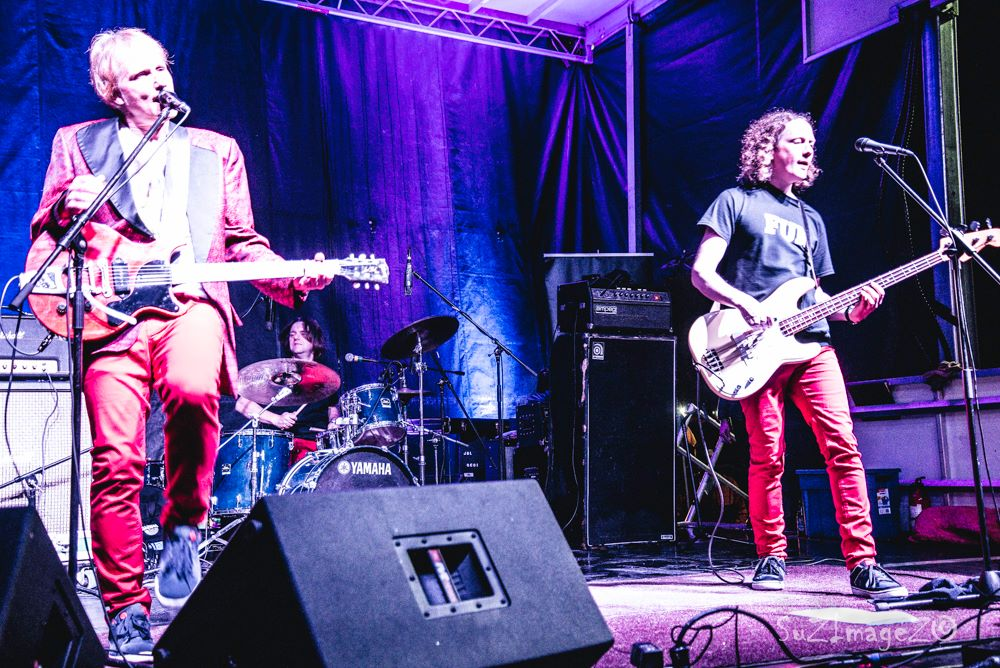
The Killjoys performing in 2015

== Members ==
Mike Trebilcock is the band's primary songwriter, and he plays guitar and sings lead vocals. Gene Champagne plays the drums and Shelley Woods plays the bass and provides back-up vocals.

== Discography ==
- Starry (1994), Cargo Records / Warner Music Canada
- Gimme Five (1996), Warner Music Canada
- Melos Modos (1998), Warner Music Canada
- Onenight and a Morningafter (1999), Shoreline Records
- Essentials (2005), Rhino Entertainment / Warner Music Canada
- Hi-Five (2006), Rhino Entertainment
- Today I Hate Everyone - Perfect Songs For a Crappy Day (Various Artists) (2011), Warner Music Canada

=== Singles ===
Year	Title	Peak Chart Position		Album
Year	Title	CAN	CAN Alt.	Album
1995	"Today I Hate Everyone"	67	-	Starry
1995	"Dana"	-	30	Starry
1995	"Anyday Now"	-	-	Starry
1996	"Rave + Drool"	-	6	Gimme Five
1996	"Soaked"	20	8	Gimme Five
1996	"Look Like Me"	37	-	Gimme Five
1997	"Sick of You"	-	-	Gimme Five
1997	"I've Been Good"	-	-	Melos Modos
1998	"Perfect Pizza"	-	-	Melos Modos
