= Mobile (band) =

Canadian band

- Mobile live in Toronto, 2008

Background information
- Origin: Montreal, Quebec, Canada
- Genre: Alternative rock
- Years active: 2005–2011, 2020–present
- Labels: Bieler Bros. Universal Music Group Canada; The Militia Group
- Members: Mat Joly; Frank Williamson; Christian Brais; Alex Dionne; Pierre-Marc Hamelin
- Past members: Martin Lavallée; Dominic Viola
- Website: https://www.mobiletheband.ca/

Mobile is a Canadian alternative rock band from Montreal initially composed of Mathieu Joly (vocals), Christian Brais (guitar), Pierre-Marc Hamelin (drums), Dominic Viola (bass), and Frank Williamson (guitar). Their debut album, Tomorrow Starts Today, was released in 2006. The band was also nominated for two Juno Awards in 2007 and went on to win the award for "New Group of the Year". Hamelin left the band and was replaced by Martin Lavallée.

== History ==
=== Formation and early history (2000–2005) ===
In 2000, Dominic Viola joined Moonraker, a rock band from Montreal started in 1997 by Brais, Hamelin, Joly, and Williamson. After some initial success, including winning the CHOM L'Esprit in 2001, the band moved to Toronto in 2003. In 2005, the band signed with Universal Music Group Canada and Interscope and changed their name to Mobile.

=== Tomorrow Starts Today (2006–2007) ===
On April 18, 2006 Mobile released their debut album Tomorrow Starts Today through Universal Music Group Canada. The music video for their second single, "Out of My Head", was nominated for a MuchMusic Video Award for Best Post Production.

Music from Tomorrow Starts Today was featured in various media such as television shows and video games. "Montreal Calling" and "New York Minute" were on the soundtracks for NHL 07 and FIFA 07 respectively. The album's title track, "Tomorrow Starts Today", was featured in the Canadian bilingual film, Bon Cop, Bad Cop, and "New York Minute" was featured in an episode of One Tree Hill.

Mobile won the 2007 Juno Award for New Group of the Year. Tomorrow Starts Today was nominated for a 2007 Juno Award for Rock Album of the Year.

On August 21, 2007, the album was released in the United States through The Militia Group.

=== Tales from the City (2007–2009) ===
The band entered the studio with producer Jeff Saltzman in December 2007 to begin recording their second studio album, Tales from the City, which was released October 7, 2008. Mobile released the album's first single, "The Killer", on July 1, 2008.

In late fall of 2008, Mobile set out on a Canadian tour in support of their album, and supported Chris Cornell on his solo tour for his album Scream, on at least seven Canadian dates.

In 2007, Mat Joly recorded "My Life Without Me" as a guest vocalist on Neverending White Lights' second album, Act 2: The Blood and the Life Eternal.

Drummer Pierre-Marc Hamelin left the band to pursue law. After a few weeks of searching for a new drummer, the band found Martin Lavallée, who joined for the Sound of Fiction tour.

The US version released with four more songs: "Dusting Down the Stars" (2008 rerecording), "Electrolove", "The Low Road", and "Don't Wait".

=== New album, breakup and return (2009–2011, 2020s) ===
After the tour, the band began writing their third album. More than 50 new demos were written for the record. According to guitarist Christian "Criq" Brais, the songs had a similar sound as their first album Tomorrow Starts Today. The band were expected to start the recording of the album this summer, expecting a possible release date by the end of 2011. As the band wanted to focus on the album, no tour dates were scheduled before they finished the recording and writing of the new material.

On March 23, 2011, Mobile officially announced the band's break-up. Lead singer Mat Joly ventured into a solo career. There was no announcement on what they would do with the material they wrote for their third album.

In the early 2020s, the band reformed with a few original members gone. Dominic Viola left and was replaced by Alex Dionne, and drummer Pierre-Marc Hamelin returned to the band, rereplacing Martin Lavallée. The third album, Roadmap To Redemption, was released on March 31, 2023.

== Discography ==
=== Studio albums ===
List of studio albums, with selected chart positions and certifications
Album details	Peak chart positions	Certifications
Album details	CAN	Certifications
Tomorrow Starts Today: Released: April 18, 2006; Label: Interscope, Universal	10	MC: Gold
Tales from the City: Released: October 7, 2008; Label: Universal	26	
Roadmap to Redemption: Released: March 31, 2023; Label: Sonic Envy	—	
"—" denotes a recording that did not chart or was not released in that territory.

=== Singles ===
Year	Title	Peak chart positions				Album
Year	Title	CAN	CAN CHR	CAN HAC	CAN Rock	Album
2005	"Montreal Calling"	34	—	—	5	Tomorrow Starts Today
2006	"Out of My Head"	6	5	5	11	Tomorrow Starts Today
2006	"See Right Through Me"	—	—	—	21	Tomorrow Starts Today
2007	"Dusting Down the Stars"	—	31	—	—	Tomorrow Starts Today
2008	"The Killer"	68	—	—	5	Tales from the City
2008	"Hit the Floor No. 7"	—	—	—	—	Tales from the City
2023	"In My Heart"	—	—	—	—	Roadmap to Redemption
"—" denotes a recording that did not chart or was not released in that territory.
