= Not by Choice =

Canadian punk rock band

Not By Choice
- Origin: Ajax, Ontario, Canada
- Genres: Punk rock; pop Punk; Alternative rock
- Years active: 1997–2008; 2017–2018
- Labels: Linus; Warner; MapleMusic; Universal
- Past members: Mike Bilcox; Glenn "Chico" Dunning; Liam Killeen; AJ Bovaird

Not by Choice was a Canadian punk rock band from Ajax, Ontario. The band released two albums, Maybe One Day in 2002 (Linus Records/Warner Music Canada), and Secondhand Opinions (Maple Music Recordings/Universal Music Canada) in 2004.

== History ==
=== 2000–2003: Debut album and acclaim ===
In 2000, Not by Choice recorded and self-released a self-titled demo EP at MDS Recording studio in Ajax featuring Dave Baksh of Sum 41 (formerly Kaspir) and mixed by Murray Daigle of Toronto-based bands Emerald Rain and Pain with a version of the track The Way It Used To Be appearing on their debut album, Maybe One Day. In 2002, Not By Choice signed with Hamilton-based Linus Entertainment, and in that same year, the band released, Maybe One Day, which earned a CASBY award for "Best Independent Album", and released two singles; "Now That You Are Leaving" which won "Best Independent Video" at the 2003 MuchMusic Video Awards and "Standing All Alone", with both singles included on two Much Music Big Shiny Tunes compilations, (7 and 8). In 2003, the band was nominated for "Best New Rock Group" at the 2003 Canadian Radio Music Awards. In November 2003, the band signed with MapleMusic Recordings. Maybe One Day was released in Japan in December 2003, selling over 25,000 records in the country.

=== 2004–2005: Second album, Bovaird departure ===
The band's October 2004 release of their second album, Secondhand Opinions, presented a different direction from the pop-punk roots of Maybe One Day with a more mature-sounding musical approach, but not well received by commercial radio, and did not meet the expectations set by the success of their first album. Despite a heavy push from MuchFACT with their video for the first single Days Go By, the band did not tour outside of Southern Ontario for more than a handful of sporadic dates. They were given the opening band slot for Avril Lavigne's 2005 summer tour in Southern Ontario, but the effort came almost 8 months after the release of Secondhand Opinions.

The band did prove to have a faithful following in Japan, and Secondhand Opinions did manage to receive a great deal of attention. The band was able to tour Japan in March 2005, performing a week of headlining shows followed by a week as the opening band for Simple Plan.

After the departure of bassist AJ Bovaird during the summer of 2005, Not by Choice took a break from touring and began writing songs for a new album. However, the band later stopped progress on their third studio album and took an indefinite hiatus.

=== 2017–2018: Reunion ===
On April 10, 2017, Not By Choice announced that the classic lineup would be reuniting to play live as the main support for Simple Plan's No Pads, No Helmets...Just Balls 15th anniversary tour stop in Toronto. This show occurred on September 16, 2017.

In 2018, Not By Choice performed at the Sound of Music Festival in Burlington, Ontario, and resumed inactivity.

=== Death of Mike Bilcox ===
On June 21, 2025, Not by Choice's lead singer Mike Bilcox died from cancer at the age of 48 in Ottawa having worked as a real estate agent, survived by daughter Isabelle Bilcox with partner Nadine Roberge.

== Discography ==
=== EP ===
Self-titled EP (2000)
No.	Title	Length
1.	"Make My Day"	2:34
2.	"Humble"	3:39
3.	"This Old Place"	2:43
4.	"Following The Blind"	4:10
5.	"The Way It Used To Be - featuring Dave Baksh"	4:03
6.	"Hidden Track"	2:37

=== Albums ===
- 2002: Maybe One Day
- 2004: Secondhand Opinions

=== Music videos ===
Year	Single	Chart peaks	Album
Year	Single	MM Countdown	Album
2002	"Standing All Alone"	11	Maybe One Day
2003	"Now That You Are Leaving"	4	Maybe One Day
2004	"Days Go By"	16	Secondhand Opinions

== Members ==
- Mike Bilcox – guitar, lead vocals
- Glenn "Chico" Dunning – guitar, backing vocals
- Liam Killeen – drums
- AJ Bovaird – bass, backing vocals

== Singles ==
- 2002: "Standing All Alone"
- 2002: "Now That You Are Leaving"
- 2004: "Days Go By"
