= You Don't Know What It's Like =

Single by Econoline Crush

from the album Brand New History
- Released: 1999 (on Big Shiny Tunes 4); 2000 (single)
- Recorded: 1999
- Length: 4:07
- Label: Restless
- Producer: Bob Rock

Econoline Crush singles chronology
| "Surefire" (1998) | "You Don't Know What It's Like" (1999) | "Make It Right" (2001) |

"You Don't Know What It's Like" is a song by the Canadian rock band Econoline Crush from their third studio album, Brand New History. The song was first released in 1999 as the final track on MuchMusic's Big Shiny Tunes 4 compilation album. The song was released as a CD single in 2000 and was very successful in Canada. The song gained some moderate exposure in the U.S. after being used in promotional clips for the third season of the UPN sci-fi series Roswell.

== Charts ==
| Year | Chart | Peak position |
|---|---|---|
| 2000 | Canada RPM Rock | 13 |
| 2001 | US Active Rock (Billboard) | 28 |
| 2001 | US Heritage Rock (Billboard) | 33 |
| 2001 | US Billboard Mainstream Rock Tracks | 29 |
