= Econoline Crush =

Canadian rock band

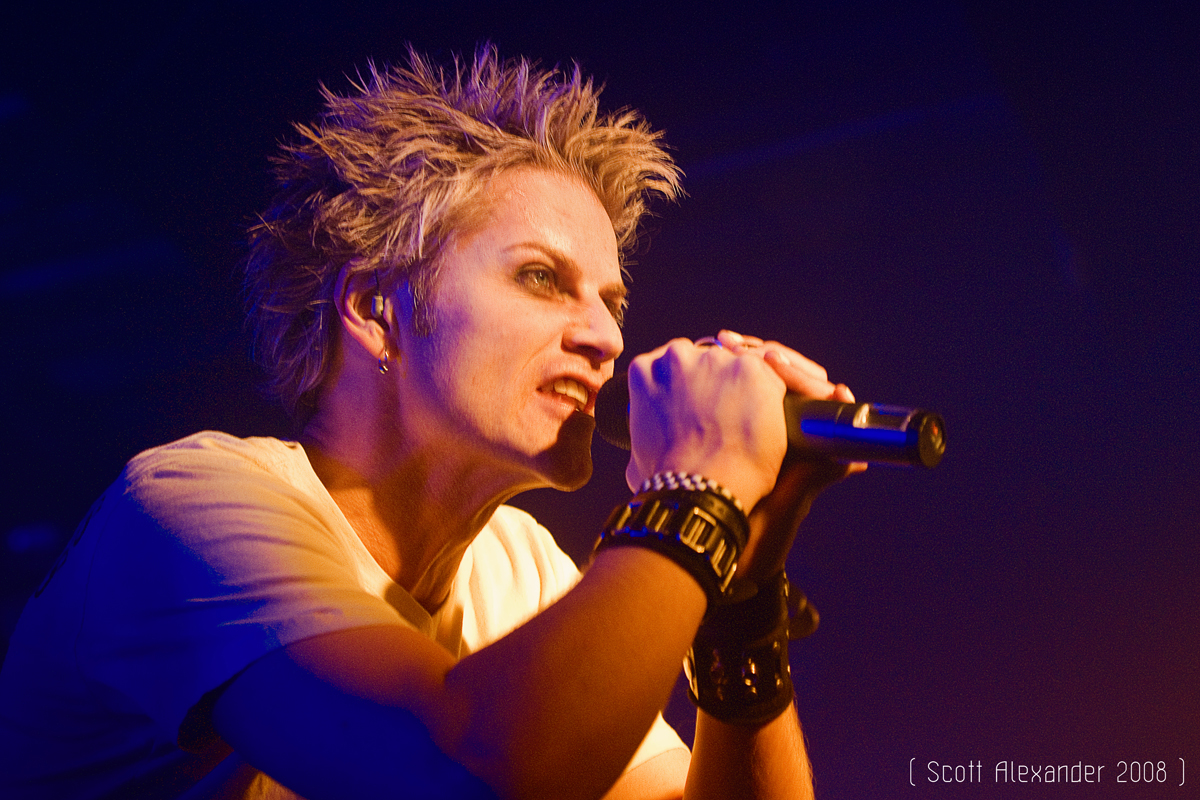
- Trevor Hurst performing with Econoline Crush in 2008

Background information
- Origin: Vancouver, British Columbia, Canada
- Genres: Industrial rock, alternative rock, post-grunge
- Years active: 1992–2002, 2006–present
- Labels: EMI, Nettwerk, Restless
- Members: Trevor Hurst; Steph Seki; Keith Heppler; Brett Carruthers

Econoline Crush is a Canadian rock band from Vancouver, British Columbia, formed in 1992. They have released six studio albums and three studio EPs, and are best known for their charting singles such as "You Don't Know What It's Like", "Home", "Surefire (Never Enough)", "All That You Are (X3)", "Make It Right", and "Dirty". They achieved platinum status with the 1997 album The Devil You Know and also received two Juno nominations, in 1995 for Purge and in 1998 for The Devil You Know.

Vocalist Trevor Hurst has been the only consistent member of the band since its formation.

== Band history ==
=== Formation, The Purge Demo, Purge, and Affliction (1992–1996) ===
Econoline Crush was formed in early 1992 when singer Trevor Hurst moved to Vancouver from Seattle after he answered an ad seeking a vocalist in the local Seattle music magazine, The Rocket, placed by Chris Meyers. For nearly a year, Tom Ferris (previously known for the band Moev) and Meyers were searching for a vocalist, until Hurst contacted Meyers from Seattle. The trio began writing demos alongside guitarist Robbie Morfitt and bassist Dan Yaremko. Initially, Ferris wanted to name the band "Crush", but the other members agreed that the name was too common. Hurst then suggested adding "Econoline" to it, taken from a Ford Econoline van; thus, they settled on "Econoline Crush".

The band self-released an EP in early 1993 titled The Purge Demo. Around the same time, Ferris (who had songwriting credits on the next two releases) and Meyers both left the band, and Econoline Crush signed a record deal with EMI Music Canada after playing only 26 shows total. Shortly after, drummer Gregg Leask and guitarist Mike "Hack" Gallagher joined the band.

In 1994, the band released their major label debut, Purge, with producer Dale Penner and keyboardist/programmer Rhys Fulber, although Chris Bryant was brought into the lineup as the band's keyboardist after the EP's release. "T.D.M." was the only song to be released as a single, and its music video aired sporadically on the television program MuchOnDemand. In 1995, the band gained their first nomination for a Juno Award in Canada for Purge.

Both Bryant and Hack departed from the band prior to the release of the full-length album Affliction on March 21, 1995 (albeit in Canada only). The album was produced by Fulber, and contained the singles "Nowhere Now", "Wicked", and "Close". The band then embarked on an extensive Canadian tour. They also toured Europe three times, with The Young Gods, Die Krupps, and Waltari, culminating in an appearance at the Popkomm Festival in Köln, Germany, with Filter. The album was then released in early 1996 on the band's new US label Nettwerk Records. While touring behind the album in the US, they added second guitarist David "Ziggy" Sigmund and keyboardist Adam Percy to the lineup. Towards the end of the year, the band signed with the management group Bruce Allen Talent, and started recording at Sound City with producer Sylvia Massy, who had worked with Prince, Red Hot Chili Peppers, and Tool.

=== The Devil You Know and mainstream success (1997–2000) ===
In 1997, Econoline Crush released The Devil You Know. They embarked on a tour with Kiss, Foo Fighters, Green Day, The Tea Party, and other bands. For the album's US release, Econoline Crush departed from Nettwerk Records, and instead signed with Restless Records. The US release occurred in the spring of 1998, and they went again on tour with Kiss, Stabbing Westward, God Lives Underwater, among others.

During the recording of the album and after it was released, the lineup had changed numerous times. Eric "Statik" Anest (from the band Collide) briefly contributed keyboards, replacing Percy. Bassist Yaremko left the band during recording to join singer-songwriter Bif Naked and then rejoined late in the touring cycle (with Don Binns, Ken Fleming, and then Thom Christiansen filling in). Drummer Leask left the band towards the end of the Affliction tours. He was at first replaced by Marc Villeneuve, and then Robert Wagner became the band's drummer during the album's recording sessions (only to be replaced himself by Nico Quintal and then Johnny Haro during the tours). Also, guitarist Morfitt was briefly in the band alongside Sigmund, but Morfitt left after the touring ended for The Devil You Know.

The single "All That You Are (X3)" charted highly in both the US (No. 18 on Billboard's Hot Mainstream Rock chart) and Canada (No. 12 on RPM's Hot 100 chart and No. 9 on RPM's Alternative 30 chart). The singles "Home" and "Surefire (Never Enough)" had also found moderate airplay in both countries. The band received their second Juno nomination in 1998 due to The Devil You Know, and performed live at the televised Juno ceremony. The album also received gold and platinum awards. In December 1999, Econoline Crush contributed "You Don't Know What It's Like" to MuchMusic's Big Shiny Tunes 4 compilation. It was released as a successful single shortly after, as overall it had peaked at No. 13 on RPM's Alternative 30 chart and at No. 29 on Billboard's Hot Mainstream Rock chart (it was also re-released in 2001 to support the next album).

During this time, some of the band's songs appeared on television shows, including Melrose Place and Psi Factor. Econoline Crush also physically appeared in an episode of The Crow: Stairway to Heaven, a TV show that was filmed in the band's home city of Vancouver. In addition, the 1999 Sony PlayStation game Sled Storm featured remixed versions of the songs "Sparkle and Shine", "Nowhere Now", and "Surefire (Never Enough)". "Sparkle and Shine" was also included on the companion album to Hitman Hart: Wrestling With Shadows; the music on the album was influenced by Canadian professional wrestler Bret Hart's choices in music.

=== Brand New History and hiatus (2001–2005) ===
The band went to California to work on their next album with producers John Travis, Bob Rock, and DJ Swamp, which included collaborations with Chris Vrenna (Nine Inch Nails/Die Warzau) and Paul Raven (Killing Joke/Prong). In 2001, the band released Brand New History to mixed reviews, despite some moderate commercial success. The lineup was solidified with Hurst, Yaremko, Sigmund, and Haro, alongside second guitarist Mark Peterson late in the touring cycle. The album contained the charting singles "Make It Right" and "May I Go", and also the previously released "You Don't Know What It's Like".

Across Canada, Econoline Crush and rapper Kardinal Offishall supported Godsmack on a tour; however, both openers were not warmly received by the heavy metal crowd. In the middle of 2002, the band's US label Restless Records was purchased by Rykodisk, which was already undergoing internal restructuring. The mixed reception of their last album, the ill-fated tours, and the eventual lack of label support caused the band to enter an extended hiatus.

The band members focused on other projects. Yaremko rejoined Bif Naked's backing band for a brief period, and then had multiple stints with the punk rock band D.O.A.. Haro teamed up with Stabbing Westward vocalist Christopher Hall to form The Dreaming. Sigmund embarked on a solo career and later moved to California. Hurst started working on a new band alongside former Collective Soul guitarist Ross Childress, initially called Early Moses; however, due to a legal dispute, it was then changed to simply Hurst. Their sole album, Wanderlust, was independently released in 2005.

=== Reunion, Ignite, and The People Have Spoken, Vol. 1 (2006–2011) ===
In December 2006, Econoline Crush reformed to play sporadic one-off shows, although only Hurst and Yaremko from the previous lineups stayed. Afterwards, Hurst announced on his MySpace page that he was working on a new Econoline Crush record, while the band started touring with Hinder. The lineup shifted multiple times, although it was eventually settled with drummer Brent Fitz, bassist Scott Whalen, guitarist Kai Markus, and Hurst. Hurst and Markus (who had worked with Noise Therapy and Methods of Mayhem) co-wrote the songs for the new album, which was recorded at Radiostar Studios in California (once again with Massy, who worked on The Devil You Know, as producer). The album, Ignite, was released on January 15, 2008. The singles "Get Out of the Way" and "Dirty" both appeared on RPM's Alternative 30 chart in Canada, with the latter peaking at No. 13. Shortly after, the band went on tour with Three Days Grace and Seether. In August 2008, they went on another tour with 3 Doors Down, Staind, and Hinder, followed by a tour with Alice Cooper in September and October 2008. In 2009, the band played at festivals across Canada, including the Halifax Rocks Festival with Kiss, on July 18.

In April 2010, it was announced that both Morfitt and Sigmund were back playing guitar. The band embarked on a summer tour in 2010, joined by drummer Greg Williamson and bassist Steve Vincent, both from Alberta's Tupelo Honey. EMI then released Surefire: The Best of Econoline Crush on December 21, 2010. The compilation focused on material from 1994 to 2001.

The band released their EP The People Have Spoken, Vol. 1 on April 8, 2011, and it featured Fulber as producer for the first time since 1995's Affliction. Afterwards, Morfitt left the band again.

=== Sigmund's death, When the Devil Drives, and Econoline Crush (2012–present) ===
On September 17, 2017, the band performed during Calgary's fifth annual Rally for Recovery Day while also Hurst shared his story of addiction and recovery. It was the third show of a weekend run that introduced drummer Dayvid Swart and guitarist Graham Tuson, while original bassist Yaremko briefly rejoined before being replaced by Troy Zak.

In a Facebook post in August 2019, the band announced new music would be released and shared a trailer for a documentary about Hurst's work as a registered nurse, titled Flatlander. In 2020, the band shared a new song, a re-working of "Get Out of the Way" from 2008's Ignite album. Another new song followed, titled "Fight Like the Devil". Both songs were due to appear on the newest album called When the Devil Drives but ended up as one-off singles instead.

On March 8, 2022, Sigmund unexpectedly died. It was initially revealed on Econoline Crush's official social media outlets. No cause of death was reported. On May 10, 2023, the band released the single "No Quitter", slated as the first single for When the Devil Drives. Two additional singles were released in 2023 as well, "Invincible" and "Locked in Your Stone". When the Devil Drives was eventually released on October 13, 2023. The album featured the lineup of Hurst, Swart, Zak, and guitarist Dan Garrison. Posthumous songwriting contributions from Sigmund and guitar contributions from Tuson appeared on the album, although Tuson rejoined the band and replaced Garrison around the time of the album's release. In September 2025, Econoline Crush released the single "New Gold Magic", which was produced by Kane Churko. It was followed by a headlining tour of Canada. Shortly after, it was announced that Econoline Crush would be touring Canada with Live and Big Wreck through February and March 2026.

Not long after the announcement of the Canadian tour with Live and Big Wreck, Econoline Crush also announced a self-titled album with a release date of February 27, 2026. The contents of Econoline Crush included two original songs (including "New Gold Magic"), six re-recorded songs from The Devil You Know, and two re-recorded songs from Brand New History (a mixture of full band re-recordings and acoustic versions).

== Members ==
=== Current members ===
- Trevor Hurst – vocals (1992–2002, 2006–present)
- Steph Seki – bass (2026–present)
- Keith Heppler – drums (2026–present)
- Brett Carruthers – guitar (2026–present)

=== Former members ===
- Tom Ferris – keyboards, guitar, programming (1992–1993)
- Chris Meyers – drums, keyboards, programming (1992–1993)
- Dan Yaremko – bass, programming (1992–1997, 1998–2002, 2006–2007, 2017–2019)
- Robbie Morfitt – guitar (1992–1999, 2010–2015)
- Mike "Hack" Gallagher – guitar (1993–1994)
- Gregg Leask – drums (1993–1996)
- Chris Bryant – keyboards, programming (1994)
- David "Ziggy" Sigmund – guitar (1996–2002, 2010–2022; died 2022)
- Adam Percy – keyboards (1996, 2009)
- Marc Villeneuve – drums (1996)
- Robert Wagner – drums (1996–1997)
- Don Binns – bass, guitar (1997)
- Eric "Statik" Anest – keyboards, programming (1997)
- Ken Fleming – bass (1997)
- Thom Christiansen – bass (1997–1998)
- Nico Quintal – drums (1997–1999)
- Johnny Haro – drums (1999–2002)
- Mark Peterson – guitar (2001–2002)
- Jay Benison – drums (2006–2007)
- Dave Heese – guitar (2006–2007)
- Mark Gomulinski – bass (2007)
- Harvey Warren – drums (2007)
- Brent Fitz – drums (2007–2009)
- Kai Markus – guitar, keyboards, programming (2007–2009)
- Scott Whalen – bass (2007–2010)
- Sean McKay – keyboards (2009)
- Nik Pesut – drums (2009)
- Ron Chamberlain – guitar (2009–2010)
- Steve Vincent – bass (2010–2015)
- Greg Williamson – drums (2010–2017)
- Lex Justice – bass (2015)
- Alex Varughese – bass (2015–2017)
- Kyle Shaw – keyboards, guitar (2015–2017)
- Aaron Skiba – guitar (2015–2017)
- Dayvid Swart – drums (2017–2026)
- Graham Tuson – guitar (2017–2020, 2023–2026)
- Troy Zak – bass (2019–2026)
- Dan Garrison – guitar (2020–2023)
- Ben Yardley – guitar (2022)

== Discography ==
Econoline Crush discography
- Studio albums: 6
- Extended plays: 3
- Compilation albums: 1
- Singles: 16

=== Studio albums ===
Year	Title	Chart positions	Certifications
Year	Title	CAN	CAN
1995	Affliction: Released: March 21, 1995; Label: EMI Music Canada; Format: CD, LP, CS	-	
1997	The Devil You Know: Released: June 17, 1997; Label: EMI Music Canada; Format: CD, HDCD, CS	47	Platinum
2001	Brand New History: Released: March 20, 2001; Label: EMI Music Canada; Format: CD	17	
2008	Ignite: Released: January 15, 2008; Label: Moshpit Productions; Format: CD	-	
2023	When the Devil Drives: Released: October 13, 2023; Label: Dig Dog Records; Format: CD	-	
2026	Econoline Crush: Released: February 27, 2026; Label: Dig Dog Records; Format: CD, LP	-	

=== EPs ===
Year	Title	Label
1993	The Purge Demo: Released: 1993; Format: CS	H.M.G.
1994	Purge: Released: May 3, 1994; Format: CD, CS	EMI Music Canada
2011	The People Have Spoken, Vol. 1: Released: April 8, 2011; Format: CD, LP	ECX3 Productions

=== Compilation albums ===
Year	Name	Label
2010	Surefire: The Best of Econoline Crush	EMI Music Canada

=== Singles ===
Year	Single	Chart peaks				Album
Year	Single	CAN	CAN Rock/Alt.	US Alt.	US Main	Album
1994	"T.D.M."	—	—	—	—	Purge
1995	"Nowhere Now"	—	—	—	—	Affliction
1995	"Wicked"	—	—	—	—	Affliction
1996	"Close"	—	—	—	—	Affliction
1997	"Home"	—	23	—	35	The Devil You Know
1997	"All That You Are (X3)"	12	9	28	18	The Devil You Know
1998	"Sparkle and Shine"	—	—	—	—	The Devil You Know
1998	"Surefire (Never Enough)"	75	—	—	18	The Devil You Know
1998	"Razorblades and Bandaides"	—	—	—	—	The Devil You Know
2000	"You Don't Know What It's Like"	—	13	—	29	Brand New History
2001	"Make It Right"	—	10	—	21	Brand New History
2001	"Trash"	—	—	—	—	Brand New History
2001	"May I Go"	28	—	—	—	Brand New History
2008	"Dirty"	—	13	—	—	Ignite
2008	"Get Out of the Way"	—	41	—	—	Ignite
2020	"Get Out of the Way (Gold Heart)"	—	—	—	—	non-album track
2020	"Fight Like the Devil"	—	—	—	—	non-album track
2023	"No Quitter"	—	—	—	—	When the Devil Drives
2023	"Invincible"	—	—	—	—	When the Devil Drives
2023	"Locked in Your Stone"	—	—	—	—	When the Devil Drives
2025	"New Gold Magic"	—	—	—	—	Econoline Crush

== See also ==
- List of alternative music artists
- Music of Canada
- Music of Manitoba
- Canadian rock
- List of Canadian musicians
- List of bands from Canada
- Category:Canadian musical groups
- List of alternative music artists
