= All That You Are (Econoline Crush song) =

1997 single by Econoline Crush

Single by Econoline Crush

from the album The Devil You Know
- Released: 1997
- Length: 3:41
- Label: EMI Music Canada; Restless (US)
- Songwriters: Trevor Hurst; Don Binns; Robert Morfitt; David Sigmund; Robert Wagner
- Producer: Sylvia Massy

Econoline Crush singles chronology
| "Home" (1997) | "All That You Are" (1997) | "Sparkle & Shine" (1998) |

Music video
- "All That You Are" on YouTube

"All That You Are (X3)" (often shortened to "All That You Are") is a song by Canadian rock band Econoline Crush from their second studio album, The Devil You Know. The song was released as a single in Canada in 1997 and experienced commercial success, reaching number 12 on the RPM Top Singles chart. The song also received airplay in the United States in 1999, appearing on several Billboard rock charts.

== Track listing ==
Canadian CD single

1. "All That You Are (X3)" (Boomtang mix edit) – 3:48
2. "All That You Are (X3)" (Boomtang extended remix) – 4:48

== Charts ==
=== Weekly charts ===
| Chart (1997–1999) | Peak position |
|---|---|
| Canada Top Singles (RPM) | 12 |
| Canada Rock/Alternative (RPM) | 9 |
| US Mainstream Rock Tracks (Billboard) | 18 |
| US Modern Rock Tracks (Billboard) | 28 |

=== Year-end charts ===
| Chart (1997) | Position |
|---|---|
| Canada Top Singles (RPM) | 99 |

| Chart (1998) | Position |
|---|---|
| Canada Top Singles (RPM) | 74 |

| Chart (1999) | Position |
|---|---|
| US Mainstream Rock Tracks (Billboard) | 71 |

== Release history ==
| Region | Date | Format(s) | Label(s) | Ref. |
|---|---|---|---|---|
| Canada | 1997 | CD | EMI Music Canada | |
| United States | February 22, 1999 | Active rock radio | Restless | |
