= Breathe (Nickelback song) =

2000 single by Nickelback

Single by Nickelback

from the album The State
- Released: July 17, 2000
- Genre: Post-grunge; hard rock; pop rock
- Length: 3:58
- Label: Roadrunner
- Songwriters: Chad Kroeger; Ryan Peake; Mike Kroeger; Ryan Vikedal
- Producers: Chad Kroeger; Dale Penner; Ryan Peake; Mike Kroeger; Ryan Vikedal

Nickelback singles chronology
"Old Enough" (2000)	"Breathe" (2000)	"Worthy to Say" (2000)

"Breathe" is a song by the Canadian rock band Nickelback. Written by Chad Kroeger, Ryan Peake and Mike Kroeger, it was the opening track on the band's second studio album, The State (1998). "Breathe" was released as the album's third single on July 17, 2000, reaching number 16 on the Canadian RPM Top 30 Rock Report, number 10 on the US Billboard Mainstream Rock Tracks chart, and number 21 on the Billboard Modern Rock Tracks chart.

== Background ==
"Breathe" was written by Nickelback's lead vocalist and guitarist Chad Kroeger, the guitarist and backing vocalist Ryan Peake and the bass guitarist Mike Kroeger. The song entered the RPM Top 30 Rock Report at number 23 on August 7, 2000, and peaked at number 16 on October 2, 2000. The single later entered the US Billboard Mainstream Rock Tracks chart at number 32 on the week of August 12, 2000. It remained in the top 40 for a total of 17 weeks, peaking at number 10 on the week of October 21, 2000. The song also reached number 21 on the Billboard Modern Rock Tracks chart on the week of February 10, 2001, after 15 weeks on the chart since entering at number 38 on November 25, 2000. The song was included the soundtrack to the film Clockstoppers in March 2002.

== Track listing ==
All tracks are written by Chad Kroeger, Ryan Peake, Mike Kroeger, and Ryan Vikedal.

No.	Title	Length
1.	"Breathe" (LP version)	3:57
2.	"Breathe" (trimmed intro version)	3:49
3.	"Breathe" (call out hook)	0:16
4.	"Worthy to Say" (live acoustic version)	4:19
Total length:		12:21

== Personnel ==
Personnel are adapted from the liner notes of The State.

- Chad Kroeger – lead vocals, guitar, production, talk-box
- Ryan Peake – guitar, backing vocals, production
- Mike Kroeger – bass guitar, production
- Ryan Vikedal – drums, production
- Dale Penner – production
- Garth "GGGarth" Richardson – mixing
- Ken Grant – assistant engineer
- Brett Zilahi – mastering engineer
- Three Mountain Design – graphic design
- Neil Zlozower – photography

== Charts ==
Chart (2000–2001)	Peak position
Canada Rock/Alternative (RPM)	16
US Alternative Airplay (Billboard)	21
US Mainstream Rock Airplay (Billboard)	10
