= Sled Storm (1999 video game) =

- North American cover art
- Developer: EA Canada
- Publisher: Electronic Arts
- Directors: Heidi Ernest; Eric Lau
- Producer: Jules Burt
- Designer: Tony Lee
- Programmers: John Harvey, Dean Stevenson, Andrea Schiel, Peter Doidge-Harrison, Mark Johnston, Ryan Cleven, John Harvey, Mark Johnson, Peter Doidge-Harrison, Gary Steinke, Yvo Zoer, Tom Heath, Stefan Postuma, Robert Bailey
- Artists: Tristan Brett; Margaret Livesey; Stephen Rowe; Tom Graham
- Composer: Robert Bailey
- Platform: PlayStation
- Release: NA: August 17, 1999; UK: September 24, 1999
- Genre: Racing
- Modes: Single-player, multiplayer

Sled Storm is a snowmobile racing video game published and developed by Electronic Arts. It gained critical acclaim due to its original concept of being one of the first snowmobile racing titles.

The game features snowmobiles (referred to as sleds), stunts and fourteen snow-covered courses consisting of slippery slopes, inclement weather and treacherous cliffs. Six racers were selectable from the outset and two more were unlockable, each of which had different snowmobile handling attributes.

== Gameplay ==
The game has purchasable upgrades for the riders' snowmobiles which can improve handling, acceleration, and more. A trick feature may be performed by using two shoulder buttons in combination with the direction pad. The combination of buttons used determines what trick is performed. It is also possible to multi-combo on higher jumps to gain an even higher score. After defeating the mountain races, the player can unlock the storm sled, which is a thin, quick and agile sled capable of outracing even the fastest standard sleds.

Sled Storm offers two forms of racing for both multi-player and solo competition: Championship and Quick Race. Quick Race allows the player to play any of the available courses unlocked during the Championship Mode. The player selects from a pool of characters, each with a unique sled rated in five areas: top speed, acceleration, handling, stability and tricks. After selecting a character, the player can set the number of laps (from two to nine), time of the race (day or night), and even the weather conditions (clear, snow or rain). Championship Mode involves competing in a series of races to earn money as well as open up additional tracks and hidden characters. Two types of championship racing are available: Open Mountain and the Super SnoCross. The Open Mountain Championship involves straightforward racing down alpine terrain to receive a cash prize for winning. Cash may then be used to purchase upgrades such as treads, skis, brakes and spotlights. The Super SnoCross involves racing strictly for points earned by performing tricks on motocross-inspired courses. Earning enough points unlocks additional playable characters

Sled Storm also features a Time Trials mode, in which the player races to earn a spot on the leader board for the fastest time. After the Time Trials, there are a number of customizable features to tailor the game to individual preferences. After completing a few circuits, the player is able to mix and match the unlocked courses to form a custom championship. The AI can also be tweaked by toggling "Catch Up Logic", meaning the CPU-controlled racers will move faster once the player passes them. Finally, the multi-player perspective can be set to either a portrait or landscape view to show more or less of the screen while racing.

Players can also save unlocked characters, upgraded sleds and circuit progress using a memory card with one block free. The game includes support for the DualShock Analog Controller to offer both analog control as well as vibration feedback while racing. In addition, the included soundtrack features songs from the likes of Rob Zombie, Econoline Crush, Überzone, E-Z Rollers and Dom & Roland.

== Development ==
The first game in the Sled Storm series was released on the PlayStation video game console. The extreme racing element of Sled Storm derived from an earlier Electronic Arts game called Road Rash. While the environments and vehicles are completely different (motorcycles versus snowmobiles and the open road versus alpine courses), there are several similarities. Both titles rely on fast-paced racing with a number of hazards placed in the player's path and include the ability to ram opponents off the track. Both also feature cash prizes that allow the player to purchase faster vehicles. The courses were extensively produced as they contained many shortcuts and alternate routes to complete a level. They could be played with day, night, sunny, and snow settings to make each race experience slightly different.

Sled Storm significantly expanded on the number of features found in Road Rash and was one of the few racing titles for the original PlayStation to include four-player support through a PlayStation Multitap and feature split-screen action with more than two players.

== Reception ==
Reception

Aggregate score
Aggregator	Score
GameRankings	84%

Review scores
Publication	Score
CNET Gamecenter	9/10
Electronic Gaming Monthly	8.75/10 (Note: Three critics of Electronic Gaming Monthly gave the game each a score of 9/10, and the other 8/10.)
Game Informer	8.75/10
GameFan	(G.H.) 89% 85% (Note: In GameFan's viewpoint of the game, three critics gave it each a score of 87, 86, and 81.)
GameRevolution	A−
GameSpot	8.1/10
IGN	8/10
Jeuxvideo.com	16/20
Next Generation	4/5
Official U.S. PlayStation Magazine	4/5

Sled Storm received favorable reviews according to the review aggregation website GameRankings. Electronic Gaming Monthly was positive of the game and commented on how "the crew likes this game – even John [Davison], who has previously complained about how horrible Extreme Sports games are and how they all need to die." The game also received the Game of the Month and the Editor's Choice Silver Award from the publication that same year.

GamePro's Beefcake claimed in one review that "EA offers a user-friendly, high-action racing game for the winter-sports enthusiast who likes to stay warm and cozy" and concluded the review saying, "If you like racing games, check this one out. It's low-maintenance winter sport excitement, with an extreme look and feel. Sled Storm takes snow business seriously!" (Note: GamePro gave the game three 4/5 scores for graphics, control, and overall fun factor, and 3/5 for sound in one review.) In another review by GamePro, Air Hendrix said that the game was "definitely worth taking out for a spin. If you don't plan on multiplayer action, you may just want to rent it, but whatever you do, don't miss out on this absorbing adrenaline rush." (Note: GamePro gave the game three 4/5 scores for graphics, sound, and overall fun factor, and 4.5/5 for control in another review.)

Chris Charla of NextGen said of the game, "An amazing physics engine combined with the novelty of snowmobiles makes this the most unique PlayStation racer since Jet Moto 1. A must-buy."

GameRevolution described the game as "a pleasant surprise" and cited that the game "has plenty of big tracks, a variety of tricks and upgrades, and multiplayer support," and also explained how "The level design and character animation are also commendable. The levels are long and showcase a great variety of terrain and creative jumps"; the review also praised the audio, claiming, "the sound effects are good enough to keep your heart pounding as you wind the turns," ending the review with, "If you are a snowmobile racing fan looking for a snowmobile racing game, then Sled Storm is a must buy. Look no further, this game is for you."

Nelson Taruc of GameSpot praised the general aspects of the game, saying that "the speed, control, and graphics seem to strike an excellent rapport with the gameplay design. The game runs at a crisp frame rate throughout the track, with never any slowdown (even in split-screen mode)" and later applauding the visual effects: "The graphics overall look solid, and some lighting effects are rather impressive - notably in later stages when night racing becomes available (another challenge gamers must adapt to)." He also praised the audio, saying, "Their musical offerings blend in well with the game's intense racing mentality, while the sound effects and racer trash-talk seem adequate enough." He concluded that “any gamer looking for a uniquely fresh adrenaline rush, Sled Storm makes for one very worthy purchase."

Douglass C. Perry of IGN commended the game, saying that he "liked this game from the beginning. It's well designed, smart looking, and realistic as they come." He also added that "From the slick, easy-to-access interface, to the muscular upgrade system, to the deep, well-designed courses, Sled Storm is addictive and fun."
