= 7 (Big Wreck album) =

Studio album by Big Wreck
- Released: August 29, 2023
- Recorded: 2020 – 2021
- Studios: Noble Street Studios, Engine Room Audio
- Genres: Alternative rock, progressive rock, blues rock, alternative metal
- Length: 78:44
- Labels: Warner Music Canada, Big Wreck Music
- Producers: Ian Thornley, Eric Ratz

Big Wreck chronology
...But for the Sun (2019)	7 (2023)	Pages (2023)

Singles from 7
- 1. "Bombs Away" Released: October 7, 2021; 2. "Fields" Released: November 12, 2021; 3. "Spit It Out" Released: May 6, 2022; 4. "Better Off" Released: June 1, 2022; 5. "Fear & Cowardice" Released: September 30, 2022; 6. "Melody & Sound" Released: March 10, 2023; 7. "Full Display" Released: March 24, 2023

7 (sometimes referred to as Big Wreck 7 or The Seventh Album) is the seventh studio album by Canadian rock band Big Wreck. It consists of three five-song EPs that the band released over the course of 16 months, entitled 7.1 (on November 19, 2021), 7.2 (on June 17, 2022), and 7.3 (on March 24, 2023), respectively. It was officially released as a composite album on August 29, 2023. At a length of over 70 minutes, this is the group's longest album to date. This would also be first Big Wreck album to be recorded without co-founding member and rhythm guitarist Brian Doherty due to his passing in June 2019, as well as the first since 2014's Ghosts to be recorded without long-time drummer Chuck Keeping as he left the group in Autumn 2020 to focus on family life. Canadian guitarist Chris Caddell of The Wreckage joined as their new rhythm guitarist, and former Thornley drummer and renowned Canadian session drummer Sekou Lumumba joined the band as their new drummer. Both are featured on the recordings.

== Background, recording, and promotion ==
Following the successful tour of their previous album ...But for the Sun, the band went relatively dark on social media while the COVID-19 pandemic occurred. It was revealed in early 2021 that during this time, the band had recorded 15 new songs that would become the follow-up album. Lead singer and guitarist Ian Thornley shared in an interview that the band had decided to release the new material in increments of five songs spread across three EPs, due to his belief in how music has been consumed differently in recent years and figured that fans would accept the dense amount of new music less overwhelmingly in this format, as opposed to the conventional full-length album format. The three EPs would eventually be put together in a composite release titled 7. Consequently, each EP would be numerically ordered in this format – 7.1, 7.2, and 7.3, respectively. Throughout 2021, Thornley posted several clips on his Instagram page featuring audio and footage from the recording studio, including isolated guitar and vocal takes and rough mixes of certain songs.

In the summer of 2021, the band surprise released two one-off singles with the help of Chad Kroeger of Nickelback entitled "Middle Of Nowhere" and "Ought To Be". Although "Middle Of Nowhere" peaked at #4 on Canada's Active Rock charts – their highest-ranking single since 2011's "Albatross", both songs received mixed reviews and reactions as they were stylistically a departure from the band's typical progressive sound. They were often compared to the Thornley albums from the 2000s, due to the more pop-influenced nature of the songs. These would also be the final songs the band recorded with drummer Chuck Keeping, before Sekou Lumumba assumed his official role in the band. The band also played a handful of drive-in concerts over the summer, where they debuted a brand new song called "Bombs Away".

On October 7, 2021, the band announced the upcoming release of 7.1. The lead single from the project "Bombs Away", and the pre-order for the EP was made available the same day. A second single "Fields", (featuring Daniel Greaves of The Watchmen, and Ian D'Sa of Billy Talent on backing vocals) was released on November 12, 2021. 7.1 was released on November 19, 2021, and the band announced a 15-date tour of Canada. The first half of the tour was postponed to Spring 2022 due to the ongoing COVID-19 pandemic. BRKN LOVE and Monster Truck were the supporting acts for the tour. "Bombs Away" enjoyed moderate success on Canada's Rock radio stations, peaking at #22. Another track from the EP, titled "Beano", did not chart but was featured on multiple Canada Rock-themed playlists on streaming services and quickly became a fan-favourite and a live staple. This was also the band's final release with Warner Music Canada before independently distributing and promoting their material under their own label, Big Wreck Music.

The band surprise released a cover of Sting's "Russians" to their Bandcamp website on March 4, 2022, in response to the ongoing Russo-Ukrainian War. All proceeds from the release were donated to the UNHRC. On May 6, 2022, the band released the third single of the project, entitled "Spit It Out," to Canadian radio stations. On June 1, 2022, the band announced the upcoming release of 7.2 and released a fourth single "Better Off". The same day, an exclusive campaign was announced that allowed people to pre-order the EP in several different formats, and each pre-order purchase was entered into a draw to win a turntable and with a one-off vinyl pressing of the EP. One of these exclusive formats included a bonus track, which was a cover of Tears For Fears' "Shout". 7.2 was released on June 17, 2022. On September 30, 2022, the fifth single "Fear & Cowardice" was released to radio with a music video featuring live footage from an exclusive show at The Horseshoe Tavern that took place on July 21, 2022, Ian Thornley's 50th birthday.

On November 24, 2022, bassist Dave McMillan hosted an exclusive livestream and confirmed that 7.3 would be released on March 24, 2023. The band announced a pre-sale campaign similar to that of 7.2, where there were several different formats available on CD to order, including another bonus track which was a cover of Steve Earle's "Goodbye". In addition, VIP packages for the final tour of the project included an exclusive autographed cassette of 7 as a composite album. The following week on March 10, 2023, 7.3 was made available for digital pre-order and pre-save along with the sixth single of the project "Melody & Sound." The song features a vintage CR-78 drum machine which the band had not utilized in a song since "By The Way," from the band's debut album In Loving Memory Of.... 7.3 (and consequently, 7) was released on March 24, 2023. The band soon after announced they will embark on a proper widescale tour for 7, including over 60 tour dates throughout the remainder of 2023 across Canada and the US.

Since joining the band, drummer Sekou Lumumba has been documenting their tours, onstage and behind the scenes, of which several have been posted on his YouTube channel. This is the first time the band has documented any of their travels in their history as a band. Lumumba has also played a huge hand in promoting upcoming works and exclusive materials since joining the group. He acted as the spokesperson on their Patreon page throughout Spring 2023. On August 29, 2023, the band officially released 7 as a composite album to the general public as a triple vinyl gatefold package, a triple CD package, and a single cassette format. This officially concluded the release cycle of the record, as the band had already started teasing videos on their personal Instagram accounts back in May 2023 of them recording material for an eighth album with renowned producer Nick Raskulinecz, who co-produced both Albatross and Ghosts with Big Wreck's long-time engineer and producer Eric Ratz.

== Track listing ==
Artwork for 7.1

Artwork for 7.2

Artwork for 7.3

=== 7.1 ===
All tracks are written by Ian Thornley except where noted.

No.	Title	Writer(s)	Length
1.	"If All Else Fails"		5:29
2.	"Fields"		4:18
3.	"High On The Hog"	Ian Thornley, Casey Marshall	4:41
4.	"Bombs Away"	Ian Thornley, Brian Doherty	5:32
5.	"Beano"		6:01
Total length:			26:01

=== 7.2 ===
All tracks are written by Ian Thornley except where noted.

No.	Title	Writer(s)	Length
1.	"Better Off"		4:38
2.	"Rye Bread"		5:25
3.	"Spit It Out"		3:59
4.	"Fear & Cowardice"		5:10
5.	"The House"		5:16
6.	"Shout" (**Bonus Track on Limited Edition CD)	Roland Orzabal, Ian Stanley	5:48
Total length:			24:28 **30:16

=== 7.3 ===
All tracks are written by Ian Thornley except where noted.

No.	Title	Writer(s)	Length
1.	"Full Display"	Ian Thornley, Alain Johannes	4:55
2.	"Fall Over"		4:31
3.	"Melody & Sound"		5:11
4.	"Hangers On"		6:03
5.	"Haunted"		7:35
6.	"Goodbye" (**Bonus Track on Limited Edition CD)	Steve Earle	4:37
Total length:			28:15 **32:52

=== Composite Track Listing ===
All tracks are written by Ian Thornley except where noted.

No.	Title	Writer(s)	Length
1.	"If All Else Fails"		5:29
2.	"Fields"		4:18
3.	"High On The Hog"	Ian Thornley, Casey Marshall	4:41
4.	"Bombs Away"	Ian Thornley, Brian Doherty	5:32
5.	"Beano"		6:01
6.	"Better Off"		4:38
7.	"Rye Bread"		5:25
8.	"Spit It Out"		3:59
9.	"Fear & Cowardice"		5:10
10.	"The House"		5:16
11.	"Full Display"	Ian Thornley, Alain Johannes	4:55
12.	"Fall Over"		4:31
13.	"Melody & Sound"		5:11
14.	"Hangers On"		6:03
15.	"Haunted"		7:35
Total length:			78:44

== Personnel ==
Big Wreck

- Ian Thornley – vocals, guitars, keyboards
- Dave McMillan – bass guitar, backing vocals
- Chris Caddell – guitar, backing vocals
- Sekou Lumumba – drums, percussion

=== Additional musicians ===
- Daniel Greaves – additional background vocals on "Fields"
- Ian D'Sa – additional background vocals and guitar on "Fields"
- Tyler Tasson – additional background vocals on "Better Off"
- Kofi Attuah – additional instrumentation on "Melody & Sound"
