= ...But for the Sun =

Studio album by Big Wreck
- Released: August 30, 2019
- Recorded: October 17, 2018 – December 29, 2018
- Studios: Noble Street Studios, Vespa Studios, The Vanilla Room
- Genres: Alternative rock, alternative metal, blues rock, desert rock
- Length: 61:13
- Label: Warner Music Canada
- Producers: Ian Thornley, Eric Ratz

Big Wreck chronology
Grace Street (2017)	...But for the Sun (2019)	7 (2023)

2023 Remaster Artwork

Singles from ...But For the Sun
- 1. "Locomotive" Released: February 22, 2019; 2. "Too Far Gone" Released: May 10, 2019; 3. "One More Chance" Released: July 22, 2019; 4. "Alibi" Released: February 7, 2020

...But for the Sun (stylized as ...but for the sun.) is the sixth studio album by Canadian rock band Big Wreck, released on August 30, 2019. After lead singer and guitarist Ian Thornley, shared several clips from the recording studio through autumn of 2018, via his Instagram page, the album's lead single "Locomotive" was released on February 22, 2019. The single was very successful on Canadian radio upon release, peaking at #6 and spending over 32 weeks straight on the chart. Over the course of the year, the singles "Too Far Gone," and "One More Chance," were released, and on July 22, 2019, the album was officially announced and the tracklist was shared with the public. This album marked a return to the band's signature blues-inspired alternative rock sound after the more progressive and experimental elements showcased on Ghosts, and Grace Street. The recordings only featured Thornley, bassist Dave McMillan, and drummer Chuck Keeping, as long-time rhythm guitarist and co-founder Brian Doherty battled lung cancer. He died on June 5, 2019, at the age of 51. The album was dedicated in his memory. This is also the final full-length album recorded with long-time drummer Chuck Keeping as he left the group in 2021 to focus on family life.

== Background, recording and promotion ==
After the release of their fifth studio album Grace Street, which received mixed reviews upon release due to the more experimental and sombre nature of the recordings, the band went on an extended tour for the 20th anniversary of their debut album In Loving Memory Of..., in which they played the album in its entirety.

The album's lead single "Locomotive" was released when the countdown ended and soon became a very successful single in Canada. Within the first month of its release, the song had reached over 100,000 streams on Spotify and held the #6 spot on Canada's rock radio charts for several weeks. The single remained in the top 40 until the following October. On May 10, 2019, the album's second single "Too Far Gone" was shared to streaming services, but did not chart on radio stations until the spring 2020 where it peaked at #42. On July 22, 2019, the band announced an extensive 49-date tour across Canada and the US featuring Texas King as a supporting act, along with the single "One More Chance" which peaked at #19 on the Canadian rock radio charts the following autumn. Later that day, the band announced the release date, tracklist, and artwork for the new album which would be titled "...But For the Sun." The album was released physically and digitally internationally on August 30, 2019. The tour began on September 18, 2019, where the band formally introduced their new rhythm guitarist, famous Canadian music voyager, Chris Caddell of The Wreckage. On February 7, 2020, "Alibi" was released a single with a music video made up of footage and memoirs from the tour, as a thank you to the fans for all the support during the difficult times.

=== 2023 Remaster Campaign ===
On February 17, 2023, a remastered version of the album was released on streaming services, with new artwork and a campaign for a limited edition vinyl and CD release. The remaster was done by engineer Andy VanDette, who also mastered and co-produced their follow-up album 7.

== Brian Doherty's illness and death ==
The band's co-founder and long-time rhythm guitarist Brian Doherty was diagnosed with lung cancer in September 2018, at which point he departed from the group and returned to his home in Sarnia to receive treatment and spend time with family. This led to Thornley, McMillan, and Keeping to record the album as a trio. Doherty's battle with cancer was kept private from the public until April 29, 2019, when the illness became terminal, and he died on June 5, 2019, at the age of 51. Canadian magazines and online news services shared articles about Doherty's passing along with personal stories the authors had in knowing Doherty. The band's fan group on Facebook also paid tribute in similar manners. Upon ...But for the Sun's release, the band announced that the album and subsequent tour would be dedicated in memoriam, including their stages on tour being backed with a flag featuring Doherty's signature Slapbird sketches that date back to the founding era of the band. He would later be posthumously credited with co-writing the lead single of their follow-up album 7, "Bombs Away".

== Track listing ==
All tracks are written by Ian Thornley except where noted

No.	Title	Lyrics	Length
1.	"Voices"		4:58
2.	"Locomotive"		5:00
3.	"In My Head"		4:10
4.	"So Clear"		4:11
5.	"Follow Me"		4:09
6.	"Too Far Gone"		5:16
7.	"Give Us a Smile"		6:33
8.	"Alibi"		5:00
9.	"Help Is On the Way"		7:07
10.	"Found My Place"		4:58
11.	"One More Chance"	Ian Thornley, Casey Marshall	5:14
12.	"The Fly and the Bowl"		4:37
Total length:			61:13

== Personnel ==
Big Wreck

- Ian Thornley – vocals, all guitars, keyboards
- Dave McMillan – bass guitar
- Chuck Keeping – drums, percussion

== Charts ==
Chart (2019)	Peak position
Canadian Albums (Billboard)	5
US Heatseekers Albums (Billboard)	5
