= Juno Awards of 2015 =

Edition of Canadian music award

- The 2015 Juno Awards Logo
- Date: March 14-15, 2015
- Venue: FirstOntario Centre, Hamilton, Ontario
- Hosted by: Jacob Hoggard

Television/radio coverage
- Network: CTV

The Juno Awards of 2015 honoured Canadian music industry achievements in the latter part of 2013 and most of 2014. They were presented in Hamilton, Ontario, Canada, during the weekend of March 14-15. The main ceremony was conducted at FirstOntario Centre and televised on CTV. Various related concerts and events began on March 9. This marked the sixth time they were presented in Hamilton, which last hosted the Junos in 2001.

== Events ==
The main ceremony was hosted by Hedley lead singer Jacob Hoggard. Performers include:

- Arkells
- deadmau5
- Hedley
- Kiesza
- Lights
- Magic!
- Shawn Mendes
- Alanis Morissette
- Sam Roberts Band
- The Weeknd

CTV's broadcast and later rebroadcast of the main awards ceremony attracted a total television audience of 1.6 million, based on next-day ratings from Numeris.

The Juno Cup charity ice hockey game between musicians and NHL players was held at the Dave Andreychuk Mountain Arena & Skating Centre on March 13.

During the ceremony, Prime Minister Stephen Harper made a brief video appearance.

== Nominees and winners ==
Alanis Morissette is the 2015 inductee into the Canadian Music Hall of Fame. Rush is the year's recipient of the Allan Waters Humanitarian Award. The Walt Grealis Special Achievement Award recipient is Ray Danniels of Anthem Records (Rush) and SRO Management.

Nominees were announced on 27 January 2015.

=== People ===
Artist of the Year	Group of the Year
The Weeknd; Bryan Adams; deadmau5; Leonard Cohen; Sarah McLachlan	Arkells; Chromeo; Mother Mother; Nickelback; You+Me
Breakthrough Artist of the Year	Breakthrough Group of the Year
Kiesza; Glenn Morrison; Jess Moskaluke; Mac DeMarco; Shawn Mendes	Magic!; Adventure Club; Alvvays; USS; Zeds Dead
Fan Choice Award	Songwriter of the Year
Michael Bublé; Arcade Fire; Bobby Bazini; Drake; Hedley; Leonard Cohen; Magic!; Nickelback; Serge Fiori; You+Me	Afie Jurvanen - "All the Time", "Bitter Memories", "Stronger Than That" from Bahamas Is Afie by Bahamas; Catherine MacLellan - "Jack's Song", "Tell Me Luella", "The Raven's Sun" from The Raven's Sun by Catherine MacLellan; Henry "Cirkut" Walter - "Birthday" (co-songwriters Katy Perry, Luke Gottwald, Max Martin, Bonnie McKee), "Dark Horse feat. Juicy J" (co-songwriters Katy Perry, Jordan Houston, Luke Gottwald, Sarah Hudson, Max Martin) from Prism by Katy Perry; "Wild Wild Love" (co-songwriters Armando C. Pérez, Luke Gottwald, Michael Everett, Max Martin, Ammar Malik, Alexandro Castillo Vasquez) from Globalization by Pitbull; Jenn Grant - "Bring Me a Rose", "No One's Gonna Love You (Quite Like I Do)", "Trailer Park" from Compostela by Jenn Grant; Magic! - "Don't Kill the Magic" (co-songwriter Adam Messinger), "Let Your Hair Down", "Rude" (co-songwriter Adam Messinger) from Don't Kill the Magic by Magic!
Producer of the Year	Recording Engineer of the Year
Adam Messinger - "Change Your Life" (co-producer Nasri Atweh) from The New Classic by Iggy Azalea; "Rude" from Don't Kill the Magic by Magic!; Eric Ratz - "Ghosts" from Ghosts by Big Wreck; "Leather Jacket" from High Noon by Arkells; Gavin Brown - "I Am Machine" by Three Days Grace; "Reaper Man" from Very Good Bad Thing by Mother Mother; Jesse Zubot - "Caribou", "Uja" from Animism by Tanya Tagaq; Thomas "Tawgs" Salter - "Soundwave" by Trevor Guthrie; "Up We Go" from Little Machines by Lights	Eric Ratz - "Ghosts" from Ghosts by Big Wreck; "Satellite Hotel" from Black Buffalo by One Bad Son; George Seara - "Got to Have It", "Whole Day" from Greatest Hits by jacksoul; Jeremy Darby - "Mosaic", "Nomad's Arrival" from Mandala by Monsoon; John "Beetle" Bailey - "Any Day Now" from Just Passing Through by The Breithaupt Brothers; "Fine and Mellow" from Because of Billie by Molly Johnson; Lenny DeRose - "I Am Machine" by Three Days Grace; "Reaper Man" from Very Good Bad Thing by Mother Mother

=== Albums ===
Album of the Year	Aboriginal Album of the Year
Leonard Cohen, Popular Problems; Bobby Bazini, Where I Belong; Hedley, Wild Life; Nickelback, No Fixed Address; Serge Fiori, Serge Fiori	Tanya Tagaq, Animism; Crystal Shawanda, The Whole World's Got the Blues; Digging Roots, For the Light; Leela Gilday, Heart of the People; Tomson Highway, The (Post) Mistress
Adult Alternative Album of the Year	Adult Contemporary Album of the Year
Bahamas, Bahamas Is Afie; Jenn Grant, Compostela; Jeremy Fisher, The Lemon Squeeze; Leonard Cohen, Popular Problems; The Barr Brothers, Sleeping Operator	Sarah McLachlan, Shine On; Alysha Brilla, Womyn; Jann Arden, Everything Almost; Cœur de pirate, Trauma: Chansons de la série télé (saison no. 5); Ndidi, Dark Swing
Alternative Album of the Year	Blues Album of the Year
July Talk, July Talk; Alvvays, Alvvays; Chad VanGaalen, Shrink Dust; Tanya Tagaq, Animism; Timber Timbre, Hot Dreams	Steve Hill, Solo Recordings, Vol. 2; JW-Jones, Belmont Boulevard; Steve Strongman, Let Me Prove It to You; The 24th Street Wailers, Wicked; Harpoonist & The Axe Murderer, A Real Fine Mess
Children's Album of the Year	Classical Album of the Year – Solo or Chamber Ensemble
Fred Penner, Where in the World; Bobs and LoLo, Wave Your Antlers; LuLu et le Matou, Le chat botté; Raffi, Love Bug; Splash'N Boots, Happy Times	James Ehnes, Bartok: Chamber Works for Violin Vol. 3; Angèle Dubeau & La Pietà, Blanc; David Krakauer, Matt Haimovitz, Socalled, Jonathan Crow & Geoffrey Burleson, Akoka: Reframing Olivier Messiaen's Quartet for the End of Time; Jonathan Crow & Paul Stewart, Prokofiev: Sonates & Mélodies; Karl Stobbe, Ysaÿe Sonatas for Solo Violin
Classical Album of the Year – Large Ensemble or Soloist(s) with Large Ensemble Accompaniment	Classical Album of the Year – Vocal or Choral Performance
Angela Hewitt, MOZART: Piano Concertos Nos. 22 & 24; James Ehnes, Khachaturian/Shostakovich; Montreal Symphony Orchestra & Kent Nagano, Beethoven: Symphonies Nos. 1 & 7, Departure - Utopia; Toronto Symphony Orchestra, Peter Oundjian, Rimsky-Korsakov: Sheherazade; Yannick Nézet-Séguin & Orchestre Métropolitain, Bruckner 3	Gerald Finley & Julius Drake, Schubert: Winterreise; Julie Boulianne, Clavecin en concert & Luc Beauséjour, Handel & Porpora: The London Years; Karina Gauvin, Les Violons du Roy & Bernard Labadie, Mozart: Opera & Concert Arias; Studio de musique ancienne de Montréal, Terra Tremuit; Theatre of Early Music, Schola Cantorum (University of Toronto), Daniel Taylor, The Heart's Refuge
Contemporary Christian/Gospel Album of the Year	Country Album of the Year
Manic Drive, VIP; Chelsea Amber, Introducing Chelsea Amber; Drew Brown, Analog Love in Digital Times; Manafest, The Moment; Tim Neufeld, The Joy	Dallas Smith, Lifted; Jess Moskaluke, Light Up the Night; Kira Isabella, Caffeine & Big Dreams; MacKenzie Porter, MacKenzie Porter; The Road Hammers, Wheels
Electronic Album of the Year	Francophone Album of the Year
Caribou, Our Love; deadmau5, while(1<2); Lydia Ainsworth, Right from Real; Plastikman, EX; Ryan Hemsworth, Alone for the First Time	Jimmy Hunt, Maladie d'amour; Klô Pelgag, L'alchimie des monstres; Philippe B, Ornithologie, la nuit; Sagot, Valse 333; Serge Fiori, Serge Fiori
Instrumental Album of the Year	International Album of the Year
Quartango, Encuentro; Canadian Brass, Great Wall of China; Daniel Lanois, Flesh and Machine; John Stetch, Off with the Cuffs; Sultans of String, Symphony!	Sam Smith, In the Lonely Hour; Katy Perry, Prism; Lorde, Pure Heroine; One Direction, Midnight Memories; Taylor Swift, 1989
Jazz Album of the Year – Solo	Jazz Album of the Year – Group
Kirk MacDonald, Vista Obscura; Jim Head, Zoetrope; Lenny Breau, LA Bootleg 1984; Marianne Trudel, La vie commence ici; Owen Howard, Drum Lore Vol. 2 – More Lore	Jane Bunnett and Maqueque, Jane Bunnett and Maqueque; Andrew Downing, Jim Lewis & David Occhipinti, Bristles; Bobby Rice, Bobby Rice Latin Jazz Big Band: X-Treme Latin Jazz; Brian Dickinson Trio, Fishs Eddy; Myriad3, The Where
Vocal Jazz Album of the Year	Metal/Hard Music Album of the Year
Diana Panton, Red; Angela Galuppo, Angela Galuppo; Elizabeth Shepherd, The Signal; Julie Crochetière, Counting Dreams; Molly Johnson, Because of Billie	Devin Townsend Project, Z²; Kataklysm, Waiting for the End to Come; Shooting Guns, Brotherhood of the Ram; Single Mothers, Negative Qualities; Skull Fist, Chasing the Dream
Pop Album of the Year	Rock Album of the Year
Lights, Little Machines; Avril Lavigne, Avril Lavigne; Down with Webster, Party for Your Life; Magic!, Don't Kill the Magic; Nikki Yanofsky, Little Secret	Arkells, High Noon; Big Wreck, Ghosts; Sam Roberts Band, Lo-Fantasy; The Glorious Sons, The Union; Your Favorite Enemies, Between Illness and Migration
Roots & Traditional Album of the Year – Solo	Roots & Traditional Album of the Year – Group
Catherine MacLellan, The Raven's Sun; Amelia Curran, They Promised You Mercy; Del Barber, Prairieography; James Hill, The Old Silo; Matt Andersen, Weightless	The Bros. Landreth, Let It Lie; Blackie and the Rodeo Kings, South; Elliott Brood, Work and Love; The Deep Dark Woods, Jubilee; The Once, Departures
World Music Album of the Year
Quique Escamilla, 500 Years of Night; Ayrad, Ayrad; Eccodek, Singing in Tongues; Emmanuel Jal, The Key; Pierre Kwenders, Le dernier empereur bantou

=== Songs and recordings ===
Single of the Year	Classical Composition of the Year
Magic!, "Rude"; Drake feat. Majid Jordan, "Hold On, We're Going Home"; Hedley, "Crazy for You"; Kiesza, "Hideaway"; Sam Roberts Band, "We're All in This Together"	Brian Current, "Airline Icarus"; Alice Ping Yee Ho, "Glistening Pianos"; Gordon Fitzell, "Magister Ludi"; Jacques Hétu, "Sextet, OP. 71"; John Estacio, "Triple Concerto for Violin, Cello, Piano and Orchestra"
Dance Recording of the Year	R&B/Soul Recording of the Year
Kiesza, Sound of a Woman; Adventure Club, Calling All Heroes; Chromeo, White Women; Glenn Morrison, "Goodbye"; Trevor Guthrie, "Soundwave"	The Weeknd, "Often"; Ben Stevenson, Dirty Laundry; jacksoul, "Got to Have It"; JRDN, JRDN; Melanie Durrant, "Four Seasons"
Rap Recording of the Year	Reggae Recording of the Year
Naturally Born Strangers, The Legends League Presents: Naturally Born Strangers; Marco Polo, PA2: The Director's Cut; P Reign, Dear America; Saukrates, Amani; Tre Mission, Stigmata	Exco Levi, "Welcome the King"; Kirk Diamond feat. Bob da Builda, "Love Inna Wi Heart"; Mikey Dangerous, Wake Up; Steele (musician)|Steele, Hold On Till I Die; Tasha T, Real Talk

=== Other ===
Recording Package of the Year	Video of the Year
Pilgrimage – Steve Bell Roberta Hansen (Art Director/Designer/Illustrator), Mike Latschislaw (Photographer); Free Will – Bry Webb Alex Durlak (Art Director/Designer), Jeff McMurrich and Bry Webb (Art Directors); Wonders of the World – The Lost Fingers Caroline Blanchette (Art Director); Pup – Pup Menno Versteeg (Art Director), Zack Mykula (Designer), Jason Bartell (Illustrator), Yoshi Cooper (Photographer); Hot Dreams – Timber Timbre Taylor Kirk (Art Director/Designer/Photographer), Robyn Kotyk (Designer), Laura Margaret Ramsey (Photographer)	"Hideaway" – Kiesza Kiesza, Blayre Ellestad, Rami Afuni and Ljuba Castot; "Preach" – SonReal Dane Collison; "Lost You" – Zeds Dead feat. Twin Shadow Grandson & Son; "Guilt Trip" – Pup Jeremy Schaulin-Rioux and Chandler Levack; "Not Up to Me" – Kandle Natalie Rae Robison
