= Albatross (metaphor) =

Metaphor for a psychological burden

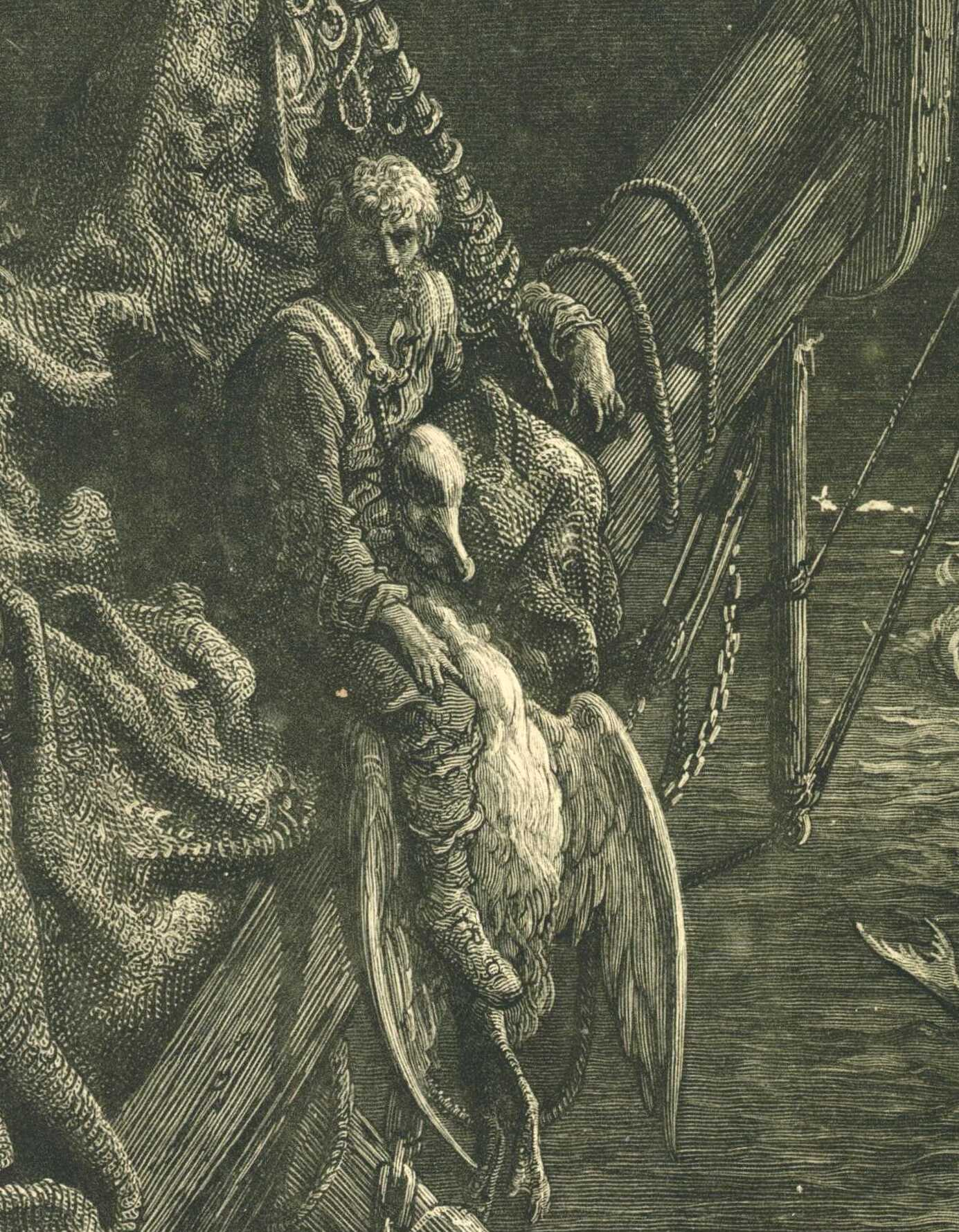
The albatross is hung around the Mariner's neck in Samuel Taylor Coleridge's The Rime of the Ancient Mariner, illustrated in 1876 by Gustave Doré.

An albatross is a metaphor for a psychological or social burden (most often associated with guilt or shame) that feels like a curse. It is an allusion to Samuel Taylor Coleridge's poem The Rime of the Ancient Mariner (1798), in which a dead albatross is tied around the neck of a sailor who has brought misfortune to the crew.

== Origin ==
Ah wel-a-day! what evil looks
Had I from old and young;
Instead of the Cross the Albatross
About my neck was hung.

— The Rime of the Ancient Mariner

In the poem The Rime of the Ancient Mariner, an albatross follows a ship setting out to sea, which is considered a sign of good luck. However, the titular mariner shoots the albatross with a crossbow, an act that will curse the ship and cause it to suffer terrible mishaps.

Unable to speak due to lack of water, the ship's crew let the mariner know through their glances that they blame him for their plight and they tie the bird around his neck as a sign of his guilt. From this arose the image of an albatross around the neck as metaphor for a burden that is difficult to escape.

== Literature ==
- In Mary Shelley's Frankenstein; or, The Modern Prometheus, first published in 1818, Robert Walton mentions the poem by name and says of an upcoming journey that "I shall kill no albatross", clearly a reference to the poem by Shelley's close acquaintance, Coleridge.
- Herman Melville's 1851 novel Moby-Dick alludes to Coleridge's albatross.
- Charles Baudelaire's collection of poems Les Fleurs du mal contains a poem entitled "L'Albatros" (1857) about men on ships who catch the albatrosses for sport. In the final stanza, he goes on to compare the poets to the birds — exiled from the skies and then weighed down by their giant wings, till death.
- In Jules Verne's Twenty Thousand Leagues Under the Seas, first published in 1870, an unnamed crewman unwittingly shoots down an albatross during the first undersea outing the characters enjoy. Several misadventures trouble the ship until Professor Aronnax, Ned Land, and Conseil make their escape as the ship is caught in the Maelstrom.
- The Oxford English Dictionary catalogued Coleridge's use of the albatross in 1883.
- In his poem Snake, published in Birds, Beasts and Flowers, D. H. Lawrence mentions the albatross in Ancient Mariner.
- The cover art for Michael Spivak's A Comprehensive Introduction to Differential Geometry, Vol.2, is a painting by the author featuring a sailing ship beneath a dark stormy sky, full of dead jesters and a single living jester having three albatrosses hanging from ropes around his neck, respectively labeled "Cartan", "Riemann", and "Gauss".
- In C.S. Lewis' The Voyage of the Dawn Treader, the ship is caught in the supernatural unnavigable darkness of the Island of Dreams. In a moment of desperation, the character Lucy prays for help and the ship is guided by an albatross in a shaft of light, representing Aslan.

== Film ==
- In the 1939 film The Adventures of Sherlock Holmes starring Basil Rathbone and Nigel Bruce, Professor Moriarty (George Zucco) baits Holmes by mailing him a drawing of a man with an albatross hung around his neck.
- In the 1940 film The Sea Hawk starring Errol Flynn, Albatross is the name of Captain Thorpe's pirate ship.
- In the 1979 film The Fog by John Carpenter, a radio-station promo is possessed by ghostly forces to speak out and the word albatross is used to tell of the curse on Antonio Bay.
- In the 1982 film Monty Python Live at the Hollywood Bowl, there is an Albatross sketch.
- In the 1987 film "Tin Men" Ernest Tilley, played by Danny de Vito, refers to his unfaithful wife as "An albatross around my neck! You're welcome to her. Keep her, and may you both rot in Hell!"
- In the 1987 film Hot Pursuit starring John Cusack, Robert Loggia, and Wendy Gazelle, Albatross is the name of "Mac" MacClaren's sailboat.
- In the 1996 Ridley Scott film White Squall, a fictionalized account of the Ocean Academy's ship Albatross, the ship's captain Christopher Sheldon makes mention of the albatross being a very good omen which "embodied the spirits of lost sailors". "Only bad luck if you kill one," he added.
- In the 2003 film Master and Commander: The Far Side of the World, as the wind picks up and the ship finally breaks out of the doldrums, an albatross is spotted following the ship. When an attempt is made to shoot the bird, the ship's doctor is shot instead.
- In the 2005 Joss Whedon film Serenity, Malcolm Reynolds, the captain of Serenity defends the notion that River Tam is an albatross to the crew and later to the Operative. He says that the albatross was good luck until "some idiot killed it". When Malcolm is speaking, he then adds to Inara, "Yes, I've read a poem. Try not to faint" in a reference to the Coleridge poem. At the end of the film, he calls River "Little Albatross".
- The 2011 film Albatross, by Niall MacCormick.
- In the 2014 film Against the Sun, Gene shoots an albatross, which they eat. Chief Dixon is notably upset about this, saying, "I can't believe you shot an albatross."
- In The Handmaid's Tale, Season 6 – Episode 4, Serena Joy refers to her previous husband, Fred Waterford, as "more of an Albatross", a comment on her struggles towards the end of their marriage.

== Music ==
- In music journalism, the term albatross is sometimes used metaphorically to describe the mixed blessing and curse of a song that becomes so popular it overshadows the rest of the artist's work.

=== Musical ===
- The musical Thoroughly Modern Millie refers to the albatross in a song called "Forget About the Boy".
- The musical Kinky Boots refers to the albatross in a song called "Not My Father's Son".

=== Songs ===
(alphabetized by artist)

==== Song and album titles including "Albatross" ====
- The band Attalus has a song called "Albatross".
- The metalcore band Anterrabae has a song titled "An Albatross Around the Neck".
- The band Alesana has a song called "Heavy Hangs The Albatross".
- Swedish DJ AronChupa has a song titled "I'm an Albatraoz" which contrasts the attributed personalities of a mouse and an albatross as an allegory of personal growth and female empowerment.
- South Korean boy group B.A.P have a song titled "Albatross" on their 5th EP Carnival.
- Bert Weedon has a song called "Albatross".
- The band Besnard Lakes has a song called "Albatross".
- The Canadian rock band Big Wreck has an album titled Albatross containing the lead single also titled "Albatross".
- The band Brave Saint Saturn has a song titled "Albatross".
- Rapper Chester Watson released a song referencing the poem called "Dead Albatross" in his album Past Cloaks.
- The post-hardcore band Chiodos has a song titled "We Swam From Albatross, The Day We Lost Kailey Cost".
- The band The Classic Crime has an album titled Albatross.
- The band Clutch refers to an "Albatross on your neck" in the song "(In The Wake of) The Swollen Goat" on the Blast Tyrant album.
- Corrosion Of Conformity refers to the albatross in the song "Albatross".
- The mathcore band Converge has a song called "Albatross", in the album Petitioning the Empty Sky.
- The band Fleetwood Mac has a song entitled "Albatross".
- The band Floater has a song titled "Albatross".
- The band Foals have a song titled "Albatross". Using the metaphor "You've got an albatross around your neck"
- The band Foxing has an album called "The Albatross". And reference the word albatross on the songs "Bloodhound", and "Tom Bley".
- Gorillaz refers to the albatross in the song "Hip Albatross", as a metaphor for the burden of the undead.
- Katie Gregson-MacLeod has an album called "Albatross," and uses the word in the final track, "Daughter."
- Judy Collins uses albatross as a metaphor in the song, "Albatross" in 1967.
- The UK dark wave band Lebanon Hanover has a song entitled "Albatross", from the album Why Not Just Be Solo (2012). The lyrics of the song use the bird as metaphor.
- Madeon played a song entitled "Albatross" as part of his Pixel Empire tour, as well as during his DJ sets.
- Mt. St. Helens Vietnam Band has a song called "Albatross, Albatross, Albatross".
- The band Public Image Ltd as a song entitled "Albatross" as the first song on their second studio album Metal Box
- Port Blue has an album entitled The Albatross EP
- The Sweden indie-pop band Sambassadeur has a song titled "Albatross" on their 2010 albums European.
- Sarah Blasko has a song called "Albatross" on the 2006 album What the Sea Wants, the Sea Will Have.
- The band Slowdive has a song entitled "Albatross".
- The band Skylark has a song entitled "Albatross".
- The singer-songwriter Taylor Swift has a song The Albatross as the nineteenth track on her 2024 album The Tortured Poets Department.
- The band Wild Beasts has a song entitled "Albatross".
- The band Thrice has a song entitled "Albatross".

==== Lyrical and other references ====
- Aaron Lewis in the song "Lost and Lonely" sings about "I'm an albatross hanging around my own neck".
- Aesop Rock references the albatross on the song "Dorks"
- The band Alter Bridge references wearing an albatross around one's neck in the song "Wouldn't You Rather" from the album Walk the Sky.
- The band Badflower references the albatross in the song "Animal".
- The band Bastille references the albatross in the song "The Weight of Living Pt. 1".
- American singer/songwriter Carolyne Mas has a song titled "King of the U-Turn" that uses an albatross as a metaphor.
- The rock band Chevelle uses albatross as a metaphor in the song "Face to the Floor".
- Demon Hunter uses albatross as a metaphor in the song "Cross to Bear".
- The band Erra uses albatross as a metaphor in the song "Dreamwalkers".
- The band Flogging Molly uses reference to the wearing of the albatross in their song "Rebels of the Sacred Heart".
- The band God Street Wine in the song "Epiphany".
- In Graham Parker and The Rumour's B-side single Mercury Poisoning, the song opens with "No more pretending now, the albatross is dying in its nest".
- The indie rock band Guided By Voices reference wearing an albatross around the neck on the song "Peep-Hole" from the album Bee Thousand.
- The heavy metal band Iron Maiden references the albatross in their song "Rime of the Ancient Mariner", which is based on the poem of the same title by Samuel Taylor Coleridge.
- Jeff Williams' song "Bad Luck Charm" contains the line "I'm a cursed black cat, I'm an albatross, I'm a mirror broken, Sad to say, I'm your bad luck charm".
- Josh Ritter refers to a lingering albatross in his song "Monster Ballad". The characters are lost in the desert after having been lost at sea.
- The Anglo-Dutch experimental rock band The Legendary Pink Dots references an albatross in the song "Twilight Hour", a song with strong reference itself to the poem The Rime of the Ancient Mariner.
- The Little River Band has a song called "Cool Change", which contains the line: "Albatross and the Whale are my brother".
- Christian Emocore band mewithoutYou references the albatross in their song "Bear's Vision of St. Agnes".
- Nightwish refers to albatross in their song "The Islander".
- Owl City refers to the albatross in the song "Hello Seattle".
- Pink Floyd refers to the albatross in the song "Echoes".
- In "Albatross", the first track on Public Image Limited's 1979 album Metal Box, the cryptic reference to "Getting rid of the Albatross" is repeated throughout the song.
- The song "Rainbow Baby" by Raynes contains the lyric "And you can wear the albatross and believe."
- Rhett Miller's song "This Is What I Do" references everyone having "an Albatross".
- The song "Morter" from Canadian electronic group Skinny Puppy's 1996 album The Process alludes to the albatross as a burden of truth.
- The band Starset references the albatross in their song, "Diving Bell," with the lyrics, "the albatross crash-lands."
- The band Stornoway refers to the albatross in the song "Knock Me on the Head".
- The band Weezer refers to "a boy and a girl Albatross around their necks" in the song "Wind in our Sails" off Weezer (The White Album).
- Get Cape Wear Cape Fly refers to the albatross in the song "Waiting for the Monster to Drown".
- Alternative musician St. Vincent references "the albatross smouldering on my shoulder" in her song "Teenage Talk".
- The Boston post-hardcore band Pile references an albatross circling the narrator's house several times on the song "Making Eyes" off the 2017 album A Hairshirt of Purpose
- The American punk rock band Alkaline Trio's song "Oblivion" mentions an albatross in its chorus.
- The English experimental music group Throbbing Gristle mentions the albatross in the song "Splitting Sky".

== Television ==
- In Season 2 Episode 18 of Route 66 entitled "How much a pound is albatross?", the guest character Vicki (played by Julie Newmar) refers to her effort to evade a burden of grief: "I left a trail of buried albatross from coast to coast."
- In Young Justice Outsiders Season 3 episode 25 Forager as Fred Bugg (with two Gs) says that his glamour stone has become an albatross around his neck.
- In Season 2, episode 22 on the Season Finale of Riverdale Alice Cooper says to her daughter Polly “We all have our Albatrosses Polly” speaking of visiting her husband, convicted murderer Hal Cooper in prison.
- In season 1, episode 18 of Miami Vice, Detective Switek calls his colleague, Detective Zito, an albatross, after he blows up their undercover operation: "We blew it, Lieutenant, because I'm teamed up with an albatross".
- In the UK show Knowing Me Knowing You with Alan Partridge, Alan Partridge requests the audience to desist responding to his catchphrase "aha!" stating, "can we stop that now? It's becoming a bit of an albatross".
- In Showtime's Weeds, the main character Nancy refers to another character as, "[an] albatross: my own personal cinder block." Season five episode five.
- In the HBO series Deadwood, a character refers to the debt owed to blacks because of slavery as an "albatross around the white man's neck." Episode 304.
- In the TNT series Memphis Beat, a character refers to family as "an albatross around the neck of a great man" (Episode 107).
- In The New Adventures of Flipper, episode 417 "Mystery Ship", an abandoned boat, a yawl, is discovered with no one aboard. She is named The Albatross. She isn't registered and doesn't appear in any databases. She appears to be sea worthy, but strange accidents occur. Eventually, the couple who salvaged her argue over whether to keep her or not. Upon further search of the boat, a boat builder's plaque is found. The Albatross was built by a boat builder who went out of business in the late 1930s. This discovery leads to a newspaper article about a murder aboard the boat, the Sweet Charlotte. Apparently over time anyone coming in contact with her has bad luck. She has gone from being named the Sweet Charlotte to The Albatross.
- In a flash-back scene of The Sopranos episode "Down Neck", Tony's father ("Johnny Boy") says of his wife, Livia, "You're like an albacore around my neck!"—an obvious malapropism.
- In season 7, episode 11 of the series The X-Files, entitled "Closure", Special Agent Fox Mulder discovers a child's handprints embedded in concrete in front of a house in the base housing area of what appears to be a decommissioned U.S. Air Force base. The prints are presumably made by his sister, Samantha, after her abduction when she was eight years old. The house where he finds the handprints—and later a diary, also presumably Samantha's—is located on Albatross St.; possibly a reference to how Fox's quest to find information about the whereabouts of his missing sister has been his albatross since she was taken from him.
- Episode 4 in season 2 of Star Trek: The Animated Series is titled Albatross.
- In Season 2, episode 8 of the series Ed, Jim (Molly Hudson's romantic interest) refers to her old car 'Sadie' that she buys back after selling (due to emotional attachment), as a 'Metal Albatross', due to its failure to function, and the fact that they have to push it all the way to her house after buying it back.
- In episode 209 of the show Aqua Teen Hunger Force Master Shake states, "We got us a super star, and we've got two albacores that are hanging around my neck." Frylock responds, "It's albatrosses". Master Shake states this to show frustration to his two roommates in response to losing, again, at a bar trivia game.
- In Season 5, episode 21 of Gomer Pyle, U.S.M.C., Sgt. Carter calls Gomer an albatross because he messed up a marine exercise, and is told to go back to the base. When Gomer asks how he'll get back, Carter sarcastically replies,"You can fly, Pyle. You're an albatross, remember?!"
- In season 4 of the HBO series Boardwalk Empire, Nucky Thompson lives in a seaside motel named "The Albatross"; a metaphor for the mental burden his character suffers.
- In season 4, episode 4 of Orange Is The New Black Alex tells Red she is sorry for sharing 'This Albatross of a secret' with her.
- The famous BBC TV comedy series Monty Python's Flying Circus broadcast a sketch called "Intermission" in Episode 13 of series 1 on 11 January 1970. Although only 40 seconds long, this sketch is one of the most memorable and remembered. In it a man, played by John Cleese, is dressed as an ice-cream girl in a film theatre, although instead of the regular movie snacks she is selling a dead albatross. A man (Terry Jones) approaches her and asks for two choc ices. The girl aggressively makes clear she only sells an albatross and continues shouting to draw attention to her merchandise, while the potential customer keeps asking questions about the product, like "What flavour is it?" and "Do you get wafers with it?". Finally the man buys two albatrosses for nine pence each. The salesgirl then shouts she is selling "gannet on a stick." Later during the episode, several other characters in other sketches shout "Albatross" for seemingly no reason at all.
- In an episode of Stir Crazy, Harry and Skip refer to Crawford (whom they've sighted through their binoculars) as "the man whose albatross we've been wearing."
- In season 7, episode 4 ("Kuwait") of The Blacklist, Harold confronts Raymond Reddington in a cemetery with a gravestone of Daniel Hutton, a man Harold served with overseas and believed to have been shot and killed in Kuwait in 1989. Harold asks Reddington if he knew the whole time that Hutton had not been dead and actually had been a POW all this time. Reddington claims that “I gave that flash drive to you so you could put the whole incident behind you, not carry it like an albatross around your neck.”

== Video games ==
- In the fantasy MMORPG RuneScape, This Albatross, known formerly as The Scourge, is the flagship of the infamous pirate lord Rabid Jack. Jack used the ship as his main offensive centre when he attacked Mos Le'Harmless in an effort to gain complete control over the Eastern Sea. When this failed, Jack renamed his ship "This Albatross", which he said would be a curse upon pirates forever. Although the ship was likely destroyed after the latter Battle of Mos Le'Harmless, recent activity suggests the ship may have been revived along with its thought-dead (now seemingly undead) captain.
- In the 2013 video game BioShock Infinite, the vigor (potion) "Undertow" is advertised by the vigor dispenser machine with the words "Ancient mariner, let the vigor Undertow disperse the hated albatross".
- In the 2010 video game Alpha Protocol, an intelligence agency named "G22" is led by a man under the alias of Albatross, who has the habit of encountering you by chance and often, depending on the players actions, offers valuable information which serves to reinforce the name.
- In the 2009 text-based browser game Fallen London, the player character can dream of shooting an albatross and the consequences that come from it.
- In the 2004 video game Vampire: The Masquerade - Bloodlines, Camarilla Prince Sebastian Lacroix expresses to the player the burden of his position as Prince of L.A. and his worry over the consequences of calling a blood hunt upon Anarch leader - Nines Rodriguez - "The folly of leadership is knowing that no matter what you do, behind your back, there's hundreds certain that their own solution is the sounder one and that your decision was the by-product of a whimsical dart toss. I pronounce the blast sentence, and I soak the critical fallout. I make the decisions no-one else will. Leadership...I wear the albatross and the bullseye."
- Unreal Tournament 2004 featured a map called "DM-1on1-Albatross"
- In the 1981 video game Ulysses and the Golden Fleece, an albatross drops a bag filled with golden gems onto a boat.
- The Hearthstone expansion Descent of Dragons has a card named "Bad Luck Albatross", clearly referring to the poem as when it is killed, it dilutes the opponent deck with two bad draws.
