= So Far So Good (song) =

Single by Thornley

from the album Come Again
- Released: March 16, 2004
- Length: 3:21
- Label: Roadrunner
- Songwriters: Gavin Brown, Thornley, Vallance
- Producer: Gavin Brown

Thornley singles chronology
"So Far So Good" (2004)	"Come Again" (2004)

Music video
- "So Far So Good" on YouTube

"So Far So Good" is a song by Canadian rock band Thornley. It was released on March 16, 2004, as the lead single from the band's debut studio album, Come Again. It is the first single released by Ian Thornley after the break-up of his previous band, Big Wreck. The song was featured on the soundtrack to the 2004 comedy film, Going the Distance. The opening riff has been used in commercials for Canadian radio station CFNY-FM.

== Radio performance ==
"So Far So Good" was a hit in both the United States and Canada, peaking at number three on the Canadian Rock airplay chart. The song was the eighth most played song on Canadian rock radio stations in 2004.

== Charts ==
Chart (2004)	Peak position
Canada (Nielsen BDS)	26
Canada Rock Top 30 (Radio & Records)	3
U.S. Billboard Mainstream Rock Tracks	15
U.S. Billboard Modern Rock Tracks	27

== Certifications ==
Region	Certification	Certified units/sales
Canada (Music Canada)	Gold	40,000^{‡}
^{‡} Sales+streaming figures based on certification alone.
