= Blown Wide Open =

Single by Big Wreck

from the album In Loving Memory Of...
- Released: 1998
- Recorded: 1997
- Genre: Alternative rock
- Length: 5:55
- Label: Atlantic
- Songwriter: Ian Thornley
- Producers: Matt DeMatteo, Big Wreck

Big Wreck singles chronology
"That Song" (1998)	"Blown Wide Open" (1998)	"Under the Lighthouse" (1998)

Music video
- "Blown Wide Open" on YouTube

"Blown Wide Open" is a song by Canadian-American rock band Big Wreck. It was released as the third single from their debut album, In Loving Memory Of....

== Track listing ==
Australian CD Single

1. Blown Wide Open (Edit)
2. That Song (Edit)
3. Blown Wide Open (Album Version)

== Charts ==
Chart (1998)	Peak position
Canadian RPM Singles Chart	31
Canadian RPM Alternative 30	8
US Active Rock (Radio & Records)	50
