= A Million Days =

A Million Days or Million Days may refer to:

- "A Million Days" (Prince song)
- "A Million Days", a song by Big Wreck from Albatross
- "Million Days", a song by Bad Religion from Into the Unknown
