= Come Again (Thornley album) =

Studio album by Thornley
- Released: May 11, 2004
- Studio: Vespa Music Studios (Toronto)
- Genres: Hard rock; alternative metal; post-grunge
- Length: 45:18 (standard edition); 51:37 (special edition)
- Labels: 604; Roadrunner
- Producer: Gavin Brown

Thornley chronology
| Come Again (2004) | Tiny Pictures (2009) |

Professional ratings
Review scores
| Source | Rating |
|---|---|
| AllMusic | 2.5/5 stars |

Come Again is the debut studio album by Canadian rock band Thornley. This followed the 2002 breakup of frontman Ian Thornley's previous group, Big Wreck. Singles off the album include "So Far So Good", "Come Again", "Easy Comes", and "Beautiful". All of which found considerable radio airplay upon release. The album was certified Gold in Canada.

== 20th Anniversary show ==
On March 11, 2024, the band performed their debut album at Toronto's Danforth Music Hall on the 20th anniversary of its release.

== Track listing ==
| No. | Title | Writer(s) | Length |
|---|---|---|---|
| 1. | "Falling to Pieces" | Gavin Brown; Ian Thornley | 3:21 |
| 2. | "Come Again" | Brown; Casey Marshall; Thornley | 3:48 |
| 3. | "So Far So Good" | Brown; Thornley; Jim Vallance | 3:21 |
| 4. | "The Going Rate (My Fix)" | Brown; Thornley | 3:46 |
| 5. | "Keep a Good Man Down" | Brown; Thornley | 3:40 |
| 6. | "Easy Comes" | Thornley | 3:33 |
| 7. | "Beautiful" | Thornley; Vallance | 4:26 |
| 8. | "Bright Side" | Thornley | 3:16 |
| 9. | "Clever" | Brown; Thornley | 3:16 |
| 10. | "Found Another Way" | Brown; Thornley | 3:08 |
| 11. | "All Comes Out in the Wash" | Thornley | 3:42 |
| 12. | "The Lies That I Believe" | Thornley | 6:01 |

2007 [Special Edition]

| No. | Title | Length |
|---|---|---|
| 13. | "Piss It Away" | 2:58 |
| 14. | "All Because Of Me" | 3:21 |

== Personnel ==
Adapted from the Come Again liner notes.

Thornley

- Ian Thornley – vocals, lead guitar
- Tavis Stanley – guitar, back-up vocals
- Ken Tizzard – bass, back-up vocals
- Sekou Lumumba – drums

Production

- Eric Ratz – engineer
- Steve Payne – second engineer
- Kenny Leung – second engineer
- Randy Staub – mixing (Armoury Studios)
- Rich Costey – mixing (2, 3, 5) (Cello Studios)
- Joey Moi – mixing (6, 11) (Mountain View Studios)
- Misha Rajaratnam – assistant mixing
- Rob Stefanson – assistant mixing
- Claudius Mittendorfer – assistant mixing (2, 3, 5)
- Ryan Andersen – assistant mixing (6, 11)
- George Marino – mastering (Sterling Sound)

Imagery

- Storm Thorgerson, Dan Abbott, Bill Thorgerson – cover
- Rupert Truman – package photography
- Michael Halsband – band photography
- Peter Curzon – logos, graphics

== Charts ==
| Chart (2004) | Peak position |
|---|---|
| Canada Top Albums | 7 |
| US Billboard 200 | 167 |
| US Top Heatseekers | 8 |
