= That Song =

Single by Big Wreck

from the album In Loving Memory Of...
- Released: April 1998
- Recorded: 1996
- Genre: Alternative rock, post-grunge
- Length: 5:04
- Label: Atlantic
- Songwriter: Ian Thornley
- Producers: Matt DeMatteo and Big Wreck

Big Wreck singles chronology
"The Oaf" (1997)	"That Song" (1998)	"Blown Wide Open" (1998)

Music video
- "That Song" on YouTube

"That Song" is a song by Canadian-American rock band Big Wreck. It was released in April 1998 as the second single from their debut album, In Loving Memory Of.... While not achieving the same success in the U.S. as the band's debut single, "The Oaf", it charted well in Canada, reaching number 31 on Canada's singles chart. Between 1995 and 2016, "That Song" was the most played song by a Canadian artist on rock radio stations in Canada. The song was certified Platinum in Canada.

== Background ==
Singer Ian Thornley said:

It actually came from one particular moment where I came out of a supermarket… and it was the same thing of [thinking about] the same person… almost wanting to dwell on it. I was fine, [when I] walked out of the supermarket. [Then] a car goes whizzing by playing this tune… I only caught about three or four notes of it, and it brought me back and triggered something where I was like ‘Fuck!’ — you know what I mean? — for about three days. Then you really get into it and you’re really down on yourself and you really want to fucking wallow in it, so you go and put on that song… and it doesn’t work. Your mind starts to wander, it just doesn’t work.

== Reception ==
Billboard reviewed the song favorably, stating that the song has "spine-crawling beats, jittery guitars...and a boombastic chorus that is so deliciously over the top that you just have to hear it again and again."

== Charts ==
Chart (1998)	Peak position
Canadian RPM Singles Chart	31
Canadian RPM Alternative 30	7
US Active Rock (Billboard)	28
US Heritage Rock (Billboard)	29
US Billboard Mainstream Rock Tracks	32
