= The Oaf (My Luck Is Wasted) =

Single by Big Wreck

from the album In Loving Memory Of...
- Released: September 29, 1997
- Genre: Rock
- Length: 4:39 (album version); 3:57 (radio edit)
- Label: Atlantic
- Songwriter: Ian Thornley
- Producers: Matt DeMatteo; Big Wreck

Big Wreck singles chronology
"The Oaf (My Luck Is Wasted)" (1997)	"That Song" (1998)

Music video
- "The Oaf" on YouTube

"The Oaf" is the debut single by Canadian-American rock band Big Wreck, released to post modern radio on September 29, 1997 as the lead single from their debut studio album, In Loving Memory Of.... The song is the band's highest-ever charting single in the United States, and was among the top 98 most played songs on alternative rock radio stations in 1998 in the U.S. Between 1995 and 2016, "The Oaf" was the sixth most played song by a Canadian artist on rock radio stations in Canada.

== Charts ==
Chart (1997–1998)	Peak position
Canada Top Singles (RPM)	21
Canada Alternative 30 (RPM)	3
US Active Rock (Billboard)	11
US Billboard Mainstream Rock Tracks	9
US Billboard Modern Rock Tracks	24
US Heritage Rock (Billboard)	7

== Release history ==
Release dates and formats for "The Oaf (My Luck Is Wasted)"
Region	Date	Format	Label(s)	Ref.
—	September 29, 1997	Post modern radio	Atlantic; AG	
—	January 12, 1998	Post modern radio	Atlantic; AG	
