= The Pleasure and the Greed =

Studio album by Big Wreck
- Released: June 5, 2001
- Recorded: El Dorado
- Genres: Alternative metal, post-grunge, progressive rock
- Length: 66:48
- Label: Atlantic
- Producers: Dave Jerden, John Whynot, Ian Thornley

Big Wreck chronology
In Loving Memory Of... (1997)	The Pleasure and the Greed (2001)	Albatross (2012)

Professional ratings
Review scores
Source	Rating
AllMusic	1.5/5 stars
CHARTattack	4/5 stars

The Pleasure and the Greed is the second studio album by Canadian-American rock band Big Wreck and the last released before their break-up. In April 2001, the band made seven songs from the album available for download on their website. On April 30, the band released the lead single from the album, "Inhale", which achieved notable radio airplay in Canada. Songs "Ladylike" and "Knee Deep" were also released as singles and music videos were released for each of them. The song "Breakthrough" features Myles Kennedy, the now-former frontman for The Mayfield Four and the current frontman for Alter Bridge. The album was released on June 5, 2001, and debuted at #10 on the Canadian Albums Chart, selling 7,408 copies in its first week.

Nickelback has covered Mistake many times in the past including appearing on the Live at Home film but is commonly mistaken as an original Nickelback song amongst fans.

== Track listing ==
No.	Title	Writer(s)	Length
1.	"Inhale"	Ian Thornley	3:15
2.	"Undersold"	Thornley	4:57
3.	"Knee Deep"	Thornley, Colin Cripps	3:36
4.	"Everything Is Fine"	Thornley	3:55
5.	"All by Design"	Thornley, Brian Doherty	3:47
6.	"Mistake"	Thornley	5:06
7.	"Ladylike"	Thornley	3:35
8.	"The Pleasure and the Greed"	Thornley, Daniel Greaves	3:08
9.	"No Fault"	Thornley	3:40
10.	"Breakthrough"	Thornley	4:16
11.	"Ease My Mind"	Thornley	3:16
12.	"Broken Hands"	Thornley, Doherty, David Henning, Donald Williams	4:05
13.	"Head in the Girl"	Thornley, Doherty, Henning, Williams	3:49
14.	"All Our Days Are Numbered"	Thornley	4:40
15.	"West Virginia"	Thornley, Greaves	4:42
16.	"Defined by What We Steal"	Thornley	6:55
Total length:			66:48

Produced by Dave Jerden except tracks 1, 3, 8, and 12 produced by John Whynot and Ian Thornley.

== Personnel ==
- Ian Thornley – lead guitar, vocals, keyboards
- Brian Doherty – rhythm guitar
- David Henning – bass
- Forrest Williams – drums
- Myles Kennedy – background vocals on "Breakthrough"
- Daniel Greaves – background vocals on "The Pleasure and the Greed" and "All By Design"

== Charts ==
Chart (2001)	Peak position
Canadian Albums (Billboard)	10

== Covers ==
Nickelback has covered the song "Mistake" live, including on their DVD Live at Home.
