= Albatross (Big Wreck song) =

Single by Big Wreck

from the album Albatross
- Released: November 21, 2011
- Genre: Alternative rock, blues rock
- Length: 4:15
- Label: Anthem Records/Warner Music Canada
- Songwriter: Ian Thornley

Big Wreck singles chronology
"Knee Deep" (2002)	"Albatross" (2011)	"Wolves" (2012)

Music video
- "Albatross" on YouTube

"Albatross" is a song by Big Wreck. It is the title track from the band's 2012 album, and was released as the album's lead single. It is Big Wreck's first single released after reuniting in 2010 and their first single release since 2002. A 16-second preview clip of the song was released on October 24, 2011. The song was first streamed in its entirety on the Thornley/Big Wreck website on November 17, 2011, and was officially released digitally on November 21. The song held the No. 1 position on the Billboard Canadian Rock chart for six weeks straight. In 2012, the song won the CASBY Award for "Favourite New Single". The song has been certified Platinum in Canada.

== Charts ==
Chart (2012)	Peak position
Canadian Hot 100	71
Canada Rock (Billboard)	1
Chart (2013)	Peak position
US Active Rock (Billboard)	30
US Mainstream Rock Airplay (Billboard)	31
