= Grace Street (album) =

2017 studio album by Big Wreck

Studio album by Big Wreck
- Released: February 3, 2017
- Recorded: July 26 – November 29, 2016
- Studio: The Orange Lounge, The Farm Studios, Noble Street Studios
- Genre: Alternative rock, progressive rock, experimental rock
- Length: 68:10
- Label: ole, Warner Music Canada
- Producer: Ian Thornley, Garth Richardson

Big Wreck chronology
| Ghosts (2014) | Grace Street (2017) | ...But For the Sun (2019) |

Singles from Grace Street
- 1. "One Good Piece of Me" Released: November 4, 2016; 2. "Digging In" Released: December 16, 2016; 3. "You Don't Even Know" Released: May 19, 2017

Grace Street is the fifth studio album by Canadian rock band Big Wreck, released on February 3, 2017. The album's lead single "One Good Piece Of Me" was released on November 4, 2016, following several teasers on the band's official Instagram page. The single proved more successful than the previous album's lead single "Ghosts", charting high on two different rock charts in Canada in its first week of airplay. The teasers were 40-second clips of instrumental music, which put together make a 7-minute epic which later was revealed as "Skybunk Marché", Big Wreck's first and only instrumental to date. Since the album's full release, the teasers have been removed from social media. The album was officially announced on November 18, 2016. Grace Street is also the first Big Wreck album to be released on vinyl. The album was released internationally on February 3, 2017. This is also the final album to feature co-lead and rhythm guitarist Paulo Neta before his departure, a month before the album's release.

== Background, recording and promotion ==
After the release of their previous 2014 success Ghosts, and the nationwide tour that followed, frontman Ian Thornley went on to record an acoustic solo album, entitled Secrets, which was released on October 30, 2015. After promoting his solo record, he returned to Big Wreck to play several summer shows and start recording the new Big Wreck album. Starting in late July, Ian Thornley's Instagram page was hinting at new material for the band, including short videos taken in Garth Richardson's home studio The Farm. Towards the end of October, Big Wreck debuted their official Instagram account, where they began to promote what would be their new album. Nine 40-second teasers featuring instrumental music — which would later be revealed as "Skybunk Marché" — were posted daily leading up to November 4, 2016, when the single "One Good Piece of Me" was released. It wasn't until two weeks after the release of the single that the new album was officially announced. The album would be called "Grace Street" and would be released on February 3, 2017. A Canadian tour, plus some American dates would accompany the album's release. Ian Thornley's Instagram continued to show more in-studio footage of new material including Dave McMillan recording the bass track of "Useless" on an upright bass guitar. On December 16, 2016, the album second single "Digging In" was released. Later, in the final weeks of January 2017, "A Speedy Recovery" and "You Don't Even Know" became available to anyone who pre-ordered the album. On February 3, 2017, Grace Street was released digitally worldwide. CD and LP versions of the album were also available for purchase and pre-order on their website and at local retailers across Canada and the United States.

== "The Making of 'Grace Street'" ==
The album was recorded with the intention of incorporating a variety of sounds and styles. Every song was accompanied by a short "making of" video, released on YouTube, with frontman Ian Thornley talking about the writing and the recording process of each song. The album also features a number of different recording techniques and use of instruments and equipment, such as wine glasses tuned with a turkey baster, Ian Thornley's daughter Sophia's heartbeat for a kick drum, and a guitar solo recorded on a mountainside with microphone places far away from the amplifiers. Lyrically, the album touches on topics of relationships, both the positive and negative attributes of one, a feature of most of Thornley's songwriting. Thornley's recent divorce with actress and CBC TV host Christine Tizzard has been a relatively large influence on his lyrics, specifically on "It Comes as No Surprise" and "Digging In".

== Track listing ==
All tracks are written by Ian Thornley except where noted

| No. | Title | Lyrics | Music | Length |
|---|---|---|---|---|
| 1. | "It Comes as No Surprise" | | | 4:17 |
| 2. | "One Good Piece of Me" | | | 4:01 |
| 3. | "Tomorrow Down" | | | 4:37 |
| 4. | "You Don't Even Know" | | | 3:52 |
| 5. | "Useless" | | | 5:17 |
| 6. | "A Speedy Recovery" | | | 7:38 |
| 7. | "Motionless" | | | 5:31 |
| 8. | "Digging In" | Ian Thornley, Casey Marshall | | 5:03 |
| 9. | "The Receiving End" | | Ian Thornley, Alain Johannes | 3:21 |
| 10. | "Floodgates" | | | 5:32 |
| 11. | "The Arborist" | | | 5:46 |
| 12. | "Skybunk Marché" | | Ian Thornley, Brian Doherty | 7:01 |
| 13. | "All My Fears on You" | | | 6:14 |
| Total length: | | | | 68:10 |

== Personnel ==
Big Wreck

- Ian Thornley – vocals, lead guitar, keyboards
- Brian Doherty – rhythm guitar
- Paulo Neta – lead & rhythm guitar, backing vocals
- David McMillan – bass guitar
- Chuck Keeping – drums, percussion

Additional musicians

- Alain Johannes – cigfiddle on "The Receiving End"
- Casey Marshall – additional background vocals on "All My Fears on You" and "Digging In"
- Tyler Tasson – additional background vocals on "A Speedy Recovery"

== Charts ==
| Chart (2017) | Peak position |
|---|---|
| Canadian Albums (Billboard) | 5 |
