= Sekou Lumumba =

Canadian musician

Sekou Lumumba is a Canadian musician, based in Toronto, who has been drummer for such artists and groups as Ben Kenney, The Illegal Jazz Poets, Thornley, Edwin & the Pressure, Goodbye Glory, Ivana Santilli, Kardinal Offishall, Serena Ryder, 24-7 Spyz, and Bedouin Soundclash.

Lumumba reunited in 2021 with former Thornley bandmate and frontman Ian Thornley as the new drummer of Big Wreck.
