= One Bad Son =

Canadian rock band formed in 2004

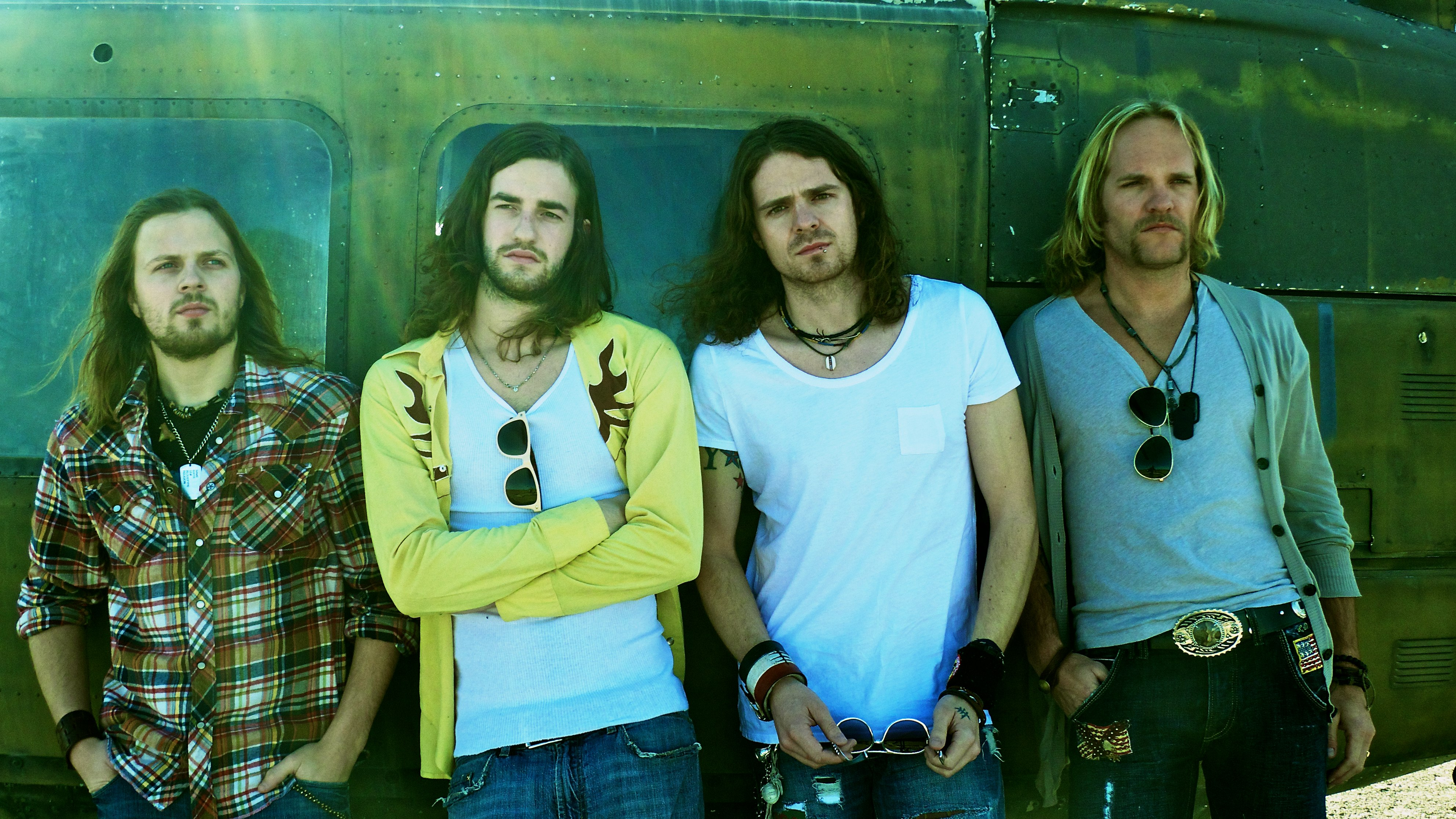
- One Bad Son in 2012

Background information
- Origin: Saskatoon, Saskatchewan, Canada
- Years active: 2004–present
- Label: 604
- Members: Shane Connery Volk; Kurt Dahl; Tara McLeod; Ryan Kuly
- Past members: Adam 'Granny' Grant; Steve Adams; Adam Hicks; Geoff St. Germaine; Ryan Serblowski
- Website: www.onebadson.com

One Bad Son is a Canadian rock band from Saskatoon, Saskatchewan, Canada, consisting of Shane Connery Volk (vocals), Kurt Dahl (drums), Tara McLeod (lead), and Ryan Kuly (bass). Kurt Dahl is an entertainment lawyer in Canada. Shane Connery Volk is a comic book artist with Mad Cave Studios.

== History ==
The band formed in 2004 in Saskatoon, when Dahl, Hicks, and Volk started writing songs that would become part of their debut album, This Aggression Will Not Stand. The album was recorded in Saskatoon in 2005, and released by U.S. independent record label Versailles Records. The album title is a reference to the movie The Big Lebowski. The single "Alive in Texas" from the album was a surprise radio success in Saskatoon, after a part time employee at the local rock station Rock 102 was listening to the song, which was overheard by announcer and music director Scott Nicholls and it was subsequently added into rotation.

Dahl, Hicks, and Volk moved into a house in Saskatoon together in 2006, and started writing songs for their second album, Orange City. The album was again released by Versailles Records and spawned two regional radio successes "Crooked Mic Stand" and "Sun/Fire." Around this time, the band started touring heavily throughout Western Canada.

In 2007, the band won a regional contest to open a concert in Regina for Godsmack. This led to an opening slot for Buckcherry and Default on New Year's Eve 2007 at the Credit Union Centre in Saskatoon, following which Default invited the band to join them on tour.

In 2010, the band released The Rustbucket EP independently. The singles "Rustbucket" and "Retribution Blues" were released independently, both of which received broader radio play across Canada. Around this time, the band released an iPhone app that allowed users to make their own version of the song "Rustbucket". In late 2010, the band moved from Saskatoon to Vancouver, and shortly thereafter signed a record deal with 604 Records.

The band's self-titled third album was released by 604 Records on September 25, 2012. The album was recorded in Vancouver and produced by Danny Craig, drummer for Canadian band Default. Frustrated with the lack of response from radio stations across Canada, the band decided to show up at various rock stations in Western Canada to play their song "Scarecrows" in person. To the band's surprise, the tactic worked and ended up taking them from Vancouver to Ottawa, and resulted in a surprise hit with "Scarecrows", which went to No. 5 across the country. The band returned home to Saskatoon to shoot the "Scarecrows" video, which featured local fans and friends as extras.

The band embarked on a cross-country tour with Buckcherry in 2013, as well as dates with Monster Truck, Three Days Grace, and Crash Karma in support of the new album. The single "It Ain't Right" was released in 2013, and went to No. 11 on Canadian radio. In October 2013, the band won a nationwide contest hosted by Sirius XM Radio to play the Grey Cup festivities in Regina, opening for fellow Saskatoon band the Sheepdogs. The single "Retribution Blues" was released in 2013 and became the second top 10 single of the band's career, staying in the Canadian top 10 for 15 weeks. One Bad Son has been listed as one of the top 10 Canadian bands of 2013 and 2012.

The band spent the early part of 2014 writing songs for a new album, and went with Juno Award winning producer Eric Ratz as producer and engineer. The first single from the album, "Satellite Hotel", was released in July 2014 and became the fastest charting single of the band's career, and second top 5 single in Canada. Black Buffalo was released on September 2, 2014. "Satellite Hotel" won producer/engineer Eric Ratz a JUNO for Engineer of the Year at the 2015 JUNO Awards. The song "Black Buffalo" was released in 2015 and became the band's fourth top 10 in Canada. In April 2015, the band was chosen to open for Def Leppard on their Western Canadian tour. In October 2015, the band was chosen by Judas Priest to open for their Western Canadian dates.

The band spent most of 2016 writing new songs, releasing their 13th single, "Raging Bull", in early 2017. It became the fifth top 10 single of the band's career in April 2017. On May 1, 2017, "Raging Bull" reached No. 1 in the Canadian Rock Charts. And on October 13, 2017, they released the new album, Made in the Name of Rock n Roll. Longtime bassist Adam "Granny" Grant left the band in 2017.

Amid the COVID-19 pandemic, founding member and guitarist Adam Hicks left the band in 2020, and was replaced by Kittie guitarist Tara McLeod in 2022. "The New Shit!" EP was released in September 2024. With the songs "I Come Alive", "Sister Renegade", and "Too Young To Burn" being released as singles.

== Personnel ==
Present

- Shane Connery Volk – vocals (2004–present)
- Kurt Dahl – drums (2004–present)
- Tara McLeod - lead guitar (2022–present)
- Ryan Kuly - bass guitar (2021–present)

Past

- Adam Hicks – lead guitar, backing vocals (2004–2021)
- Steve Adams – bass, backing vocals (2017–2019)
- Adam "Granny" Grant – bass, backing vocals (2007–2017)
- Geoff St. Germaine – bass, backing vocals (2004–2006)
- Ryan Serblowski - bass (2006–2007)

== Discography ==
=== Albums ===
- This Aggression Will Not Stand (2006)
- Orange City (2007)
- The Rustbucket EP (2010)
- One Bad Son (2012)
- Black Buffalo (2014)
- Made in the Name of Rock n Roll (2017)
- The New Shit EP (2024)

=== Singles ===
- "Alive in Texas" (2005)
- "Sun/Fire" (2007)
- "Gringo" (2007)
- "Crooked Mic Stand" (2008)
- "Rustbucket" (2010)
- "Retribution Blues" (2010)
- "Scarecrows" (2012)
- "It Ain't Right" (2013)
- "Retribution Blues" (2013)
- "Satellite Hotel" (2014)
- "Vinyl Spin Burner" (2014)
- "Black Buffalo" (2015)
- "Psycho Killer" (2015)
- "Raging Bull" (2017)
- "Scream for Me" (2017)
- "Hurricane" (2018)
- "I Come Alive" (2023)
- "Sister Renegade" (2024)
- "Too Young To Burn" (2024)

=== Charting singles ===
Year	Song	Chart peak	Album
Year	Song	CAN Rock	Album
2010	"Retribution Blues"	42	The Rustbucket EP
2012	"Rustbucket"	33	One Bad Son
2012	"Scarecrows"	5	One Bad Son
2013	"It Ain't Right"	11	One Bad Son
2013	"Retribution Blues"	6	One Bad Son
2014	"Satellite Hotel"	5	Black Buffalo
2014	"Vinyl Spin Burner"	—	Black Buffalo
2015	"Black Buffalo"	6	Black Buffalo
2015	"Psycho Killer"	18	Black Buffalo
2017	"Raging Bull"	1	Made in the Name of Rock n Roll
2017	"Scream for Me"	8	Made in the Name of Rock n Roll
2018	"Hurricane"	18	Made in the Name of Rock n Roll
"—"denotes a release that did not chart.

=== Music videos ===
Year	Video	Director
2013	"Scarecrows"	Matt Scott
2013	"It Ain't Right"	Matt Leaf
2013	"Retribution Blues"	Matt Scott
2014	"Satellite Hotel"	George Vale
2015	"Black Buffalo"	Shane Volk
2015	"Psycho Killer"	Shane Volk
2017	"Raging Bull"	Daniel Keen
2017	"Scream for Me"	Unknown
2018	"Hurricane"	Unknown
