= Tiny Pictures =

Studio album by Thornley
- Released: February 10, 2009 (Canada only) December 15, 2009 (International)
- Recorded: 2008
- Genre: Hard rock, post-grunge
- Length: 54:55
- Label: 604/Universal
- Producer: Nick Raskulinecz

Thornley chronology
Come Again (2004)	Tiny Pictures (2009)

Professional ratings
Review scores
Source	Rating
Allmusic	3/5 stars
TuneLab Music	8/10 stars

Tiny Pictures is the second and final studio album by Canadian rock band Thornley. The album was released in Canada on February 10, 2009, and in the U.S. on February 3, 2010. The first single, "Make Believe," was released to radio on December 12, 2008. Most of the songs on the album have been written for years but the five-year wait since Thornley's last release allowed Ian Thornley to bring on Nick Raskulinecz as producer, whose previous work includes albums with Foo Fighters and Velvet Revolver.

Though this is the band's release, frontman Ian Thornley plays nearly all of the instruments that appear on the record. The songs were written by Ian and former guitar player Tavis Stanley, with a few tracks bringing on writing collaborations including "Make Believe" with Dave Genn (54-40, Matthew Good Band), "Your Song" with Nickelback's Chad Kroeger, and "Another Memory" with Alain Johannes and Natasha Shneider.

The album was recorded in 2008 in Toronto’s Phase 1 and Alex Lifeson's Lerxst Sound studios. Thornley describes his wish to achieve a vintage rock sound embellished with subtle hooks and "fairy dust, bells and whistles," similar to Bruce Springsteen’s Born to Run, where repeated listens reveal more and more enjoyment with new layers apparent each time.

The Tiny Pictures cover art was done by the graphic designer Storm Thorgerson, who also did the art for Come Again, and who has designed album covers for Pink Floyd, Led Zeppelin, Muse, and The Mars Volta. The cover depicts a large pile of suitcases stacked to look like a man's face.

== Track listing ==
No.	Title	Length
1.	"Underneath The Radar"	3:55
2.	"Changes"	4:34
3.	"Man Overboard"	3:33
4.	"Your Song"	3:59
5.	"Make Believe"	3:39
6.	"This Is Where My Heart Is"	4:42
7.	"Better Side of Me"	3:03
8.	"Might Be The End"	6:38
9.	"Conscience & Consequence"	3:43
10.	"All Fall Down"	4:05
11.	"Be There For Me"	4:36
12.	"Another Memory"	4:56
13.	"Make Believe (West Coast Version)" (bonus track)	3:27
