= Thornley (band) =

Canadian rock band

- Origin: Toronto, Ontario, Canada
- Genres: Hard rock, alternative metal, post-grunge
- Years active: 2002–2011, 2024
- Labels: Anthem, SRO
- Past members: Ian Thornley; Paulo Neta; Brian Doherty; Dave McMillan; Brad Park; Sekou Lumumba; Tavis Stanley; Cale Gontier; Ken Tizzard

Thornley was a Canadian alternative rock band formed by Ian Thornley in 2002. The band was started when Thornley returned to Toronto after Big Wreck went on hiatus. Collaborating with Chad Kroeger of Nickelback, Thornley signed to Kroeger's 604 Records. The last line-up of the band as Thornley had Paulo Neta (guitar), Dave McMillan (bass guitar), Christopher Henry (drums), and former Big Wreck member Brian Doherty (guitar).

== History ==
The band's first album, Come Again, was produced by Gavin Brown, and released on 604 Records in 2004. Thornley toured Canada and the USA extensively after the album was released and Come Again was certified gold in Canada (50,000 units) by the CRIA, while also producing two No. 1 singles ("So Far So Good" also certified Gold in Canada, and "Come Again"). Thornley was nominated for two Juno Awards in the wake of Come Again: New Group of the Year and Rock Album of the Year. Thornley's single "Easy Comes" was used in the intro video for the PlayStation Portable game ATV: Offroad: Blazin' Trails.

The band initially included Ken Tizzard (formerly of The Watchmen) on bass guitar and Sekou Lumumba (formerly of Edwin & The Pressure) on drums. However, in October 2005, for unknown reasons, they left Thornley and moved on to other personal projects. Thornley continued touring immediately.

For album's support Thornley toured with Three Days Grace, Thousand Foot Krutch, My Darkest Days, Nickelback, Hawksley Workman and many Canadian bands, and opened for Lenny Kravitz.

On December 12, 2008, Thornley released the first single, "Make Believe", from their second album Tiny Pictures. The album itself was released on February 10, 2009. It was produced by Nick Raskulinecz (Foo Fighters, Velvet Revolver, Rush).

For their second album, Ian Thornley recorded all guitars on the record including lead and rhythm guitar as well as bass guitar. Daniel Adair, the drummer from the Canadian rock band Nickelback, played drums on the album. Chad Kroeger, also of Nickelback, co-wrote a track on the album with Ian Thornley along with Alain Johannes and Natasha Shneider of Eleven, who also co-wrote some of the tracks.

Thornley toured extensively, including a performance at the Paralympics in Vancouver on March 12, 2010.

In 2010, Thornley and Brian Doherty, a founding member of Big Wreck, rekindled their friendship which led to the latter filling in for a Thornley show, and then joining the band as they naturally reconnected as musicians.

The band embarked on a Canadian tour titled "An Evening with Thornley and Big Wreck". As a result of the tour's success, the band took on the Big Wreck name, and all existing members of Thornley effectively became members of Big Wreck.

In July 2011, Ian Thornley signed with Anthem/SRO. The first release under Anthem, Albatross, was released on March 6, 2012, and included the number one self-titled single.

On May 11, 2024, the band reunited for the first time in 13 years to perform a one-night only show at The Danforth Music Hall to celebrate the 20th anniversary of Come Again. The album was also released on vinyl for the first time ever on a special limited coloured vinyl. The album was also remastered and reissued digitally on streaming services with two previously unreleased songs.

== Band members ==
- Ian Thornley – vocals, lead guitar (2002–2011)
- Paulo Neta – rhythm guitar (2009–2011) also in Black Rail; formerly of My Darkest Days and Hurst
- Brian Doherty – rhythm guitar (2010–2011)
- Dave McMillan – bass guitar (2010–2011)
- Brad Park – drums (2011)
- Ken Tizzard – bass guitar (2002–2005, 2011) in The Watchmen
- Christopher Henry – drums (2010–2011)
- Sekou Lumumba – drums (2002–2005) now in Big Wreck, Heavy Young Heathens and Ben Kenney's band; formerly of Edwin & the Pressure and Goodbye Glory
- Liam Killeen – drums (2006)
- Tavis Stanley – guitar (2005–2009) now in Art of Dying
- Cale Gontier – bass guitar (2005–2010) also in Art of Dying and Saint Asonia; former guitar technician for Three Days Grace
- Patrick Benti – rhythm guitar (2009)

== Discography ==
=== Studio albums ===
Year	Album	US	CAN	Label
2004	Come Again	167	7	604 Records / Roadrunner Records
2009	Tiny Pictures	—	13	604 Records / Universal Music Group

=== Singles ===
Year	Single	Peak chart positions				Album
Year	Single	CAN	CAN Rock	U.S. Mod	U.S. Main	Album
2004	"So Far So Good"	26	3	27	15	Come Again
2004	"Come Again"	—	5	—	—	Come Again
2004	"Easy Comes"^{1}	—	—	—	27	Come Again
2005	"Beautiful"^{2}	—	14	—	—	Come Again
2005	"All Comes Out In the Wash"^{2}	—	—	—	—	Come Again
2008	"Make Believe"	48	4	—	—	Tiny Pictures
2009	"Changes" ^{2}	—	17	—	—	Tiny Pictures
2009	"Conscience & Consequence" ^{2}	—	32	—	—	Tiny Pictures
2010	"Man Overboard" ^{2}	—	9	—	—	Tiny Pictures

^{1} : U.S. single only
^{2} : Canadian single only

== Awards ==
Juno Awards

Year	Category	Title	Result
2005	New Group of the Year	Thornley	Nominated
2005	Rock Album of the Year	"Come Again"	Nominated

== See also ==
- Rock music of Canada
- Music of Canada
