= Big Wreck =

Canadian rock band

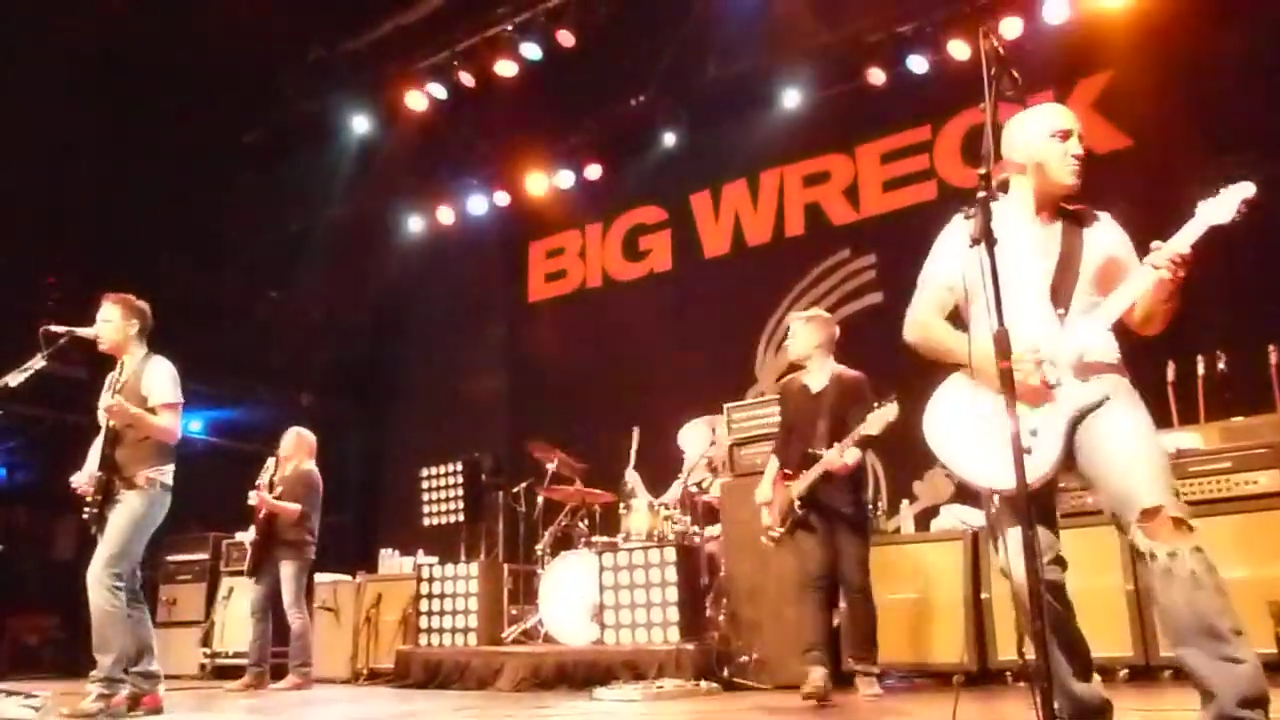
- Big Wreck performing in 2012

Background information
- Also known as: Still Waters (1992–1994)
- Origin: Boston, United States
- Genres: Alternative rock; progressive rock; blues rock; post-grunge (early)
- Years active: 1992–2003, 2010–present
- Labels: Anthem; Atlantic; Warner Music Canada; Big Wreck Music
- Members: Ian Thornley; Dave McMillan; Paulo Neta; Chris Caddell; Brett Haggarty
- Past members: Brian Doherty; Dave Henning; Brad Park; Chuck Keeping; Forrest Williams; Sekou Lumumba
- Website: bigwreckmusic.com

Big Wreck are a Canadian rock band formed by Ian Thornley and Brian Doherty in Boston, Massachusetts, in 1992. The band was rounded out with David Henning and Forrest Williams. They disbanded in 2003 and Ian Thornley pursued a solo career with his own band Thornley. In 2010, Ian Thornley and Brian Doherty reunited for a cross-Canada tour, playing both Big Wreck and Thornley songs. In 2012, under the name Big Wreck, the band released their third studio album, Albatross. The band has since released the albums Ghosts in 2014, Grace Street in 2017, ...But for the Sun in 2019, 7 in 2023, and The Rest of the Story in 2025.

== History ==
=== Formation as Still Waters, In Loving Memory Of... (1992–2000) ===
Big Wreck was originally formed in Boston, Massachusetts by guitarist Ian Thornley, guitarist Brian Doherty, bassist Dave Henning and drummer Forrest Williams while they were students at the Berklee College of Music. Henning and Doherty were previously part of the band Divine Right with lead singer Jim McDermott and drummer Dave Tuohy. The future Big Wreck lineup began jamming and playing gigs together under the name Still Waters in 1992. Unsatisfied with their name, they set out to choose a new official band name, and according to Thornley they settled upon the name Big Wreck in 1994 after something went wrong during a rehearsal session and Doherty exclaimed the session was a "big wreck". Upon their formation, Thornley was not the original singer of the band, but he became the singer after the band couldn't find one. In early 1995, the band recorded and released their first known demo tape which featured six songs, one of which was the original recording of "Overemphasizing" which would be later remixed and remastered for their debut album. The other five songs have yet to see a commercial release, but elements have been used in later recorded and released material. After a few years of gigging in the Boston area and Toronto, the band got signed to Atlantic Records and released their debut album In Loving Memory Of... in 1997. In the US, their single "The Oaf (My Luck Is Wasted)" reached the top ten on the Billboard Mainstream Rock Chart in early 1998. Four months later, their follow-up single "That Song" reached the top 40 on that same chart. The band found even bigger commercial success in Canada, scoring 4 top 40 hits on the Canadian Singles Chart. The band went on a 17-date tour to publicize their releases.

=== The Pleasure and the Greed, breakup, other projects (2000–2003) ===
Big Wreck released their second album, The Pleasure and the Greed, in June 2001. Three singles were released, all of which failed to chart in the U.S.

In October of that year, the band played a special show at Toronto's Roy Thomson Hall accompanied by the Toronto Symphony Orchestra and the Uzume Taiko Ensemble of drummers, guitarist Eric Johnson and The Tragically Hip's Paul Langlois and Robby Baker.

The band broke up in early 2003. Ian Thornley moved back to Toronto and formed the band Thornley. Brian Doherty moved to Camlachie, a small community near Sarnia, Ontario, where he taught guitar and prepared students for University or Conservatory entrance requirements. Doherty also went on to form the indie rock band Death of 8.

=== Reunion, Albatross, and Bag of Tricks (2010–2014) ===
In 2010, Doherty filled in as guitarist at a Thornley show during the Tiny Pictures tour, and that led to Doherty joining the band as a touring member. Later that year, a new tour promoted as "An Evening with Thornley and Big Wreck" followed, and as a result of the tour's success, the band assumed the Big Wreck moniker, including the existing members of Thornley in the new Big Wreck. In secret, Big Wreck had worked on a reunion album which would later be announced as Albatross. After recording the album, signing to Anthem, and departing from 604 Records in July 2011, drummer Christopher Henry left the group and was replaced with touring drummer Brad Park. In November 2011, Big Wreck released the lead single and title track off their upcoming album, "Albatross" their first single release in over ten years. The song received praise and chart success in both the US and Canada, eventually earning the band's first #1 hit.

On February 5, 2012, Big Wreck performed at the Sound Academy in Toronto for Canada's Official Super Bowl XLVI party. They also completed two tours that year, touring Canada from British Columbia to Ontario from April to July, then accompanying Theory of a Deadman for their Jingle Bell Rock tour from November to December, at which time Brad Park was replaced with Chuck Keeping on drums. On June 25, 2013, the band released their first EP, Bag of Tricks, which was compiled of live recordings from the Albatross Tour and a cover of The Cars' "Good Times Roll." It was released as a digital exclusive.

=== Ghosts and Grace Street (2014–2018) ===
In 2014, the band released their fourth studio album, Ghosts. The album was released in Canada on June 10, 2014, and in the US in July. The album reached #5 on the Canadian Albums Chart and #4 on the US Billboard Heatseekers Albums Chart. The album was nominated for "Rock Album of the Year" at the Juno Awards of 2015.

In November 2016, Big Wreck released a new single "One Good Piece Of Me" from their upcoming album, Grace Street.

On January 5, 2017, after the recording of Grace Street, but prior to its release, guitarist Paulo Neta departed from Big Wreck. Ian Thornley wrote the following on Big Wreck's Facebook page:

Beloved Big Wreck fans, it's with a heavy heart that we announce Paulo's departure from the band. He has chosen to take a different path in his life and we stand behind his decision, and beside him for life. He is our brother and he will be missed greatly. There will always be room for him on any stage I play on. Ian & BW

Grace Street was released on February 3, 2017. The band embarked on a 31-date tour in support of the album, with supporting act Ascot Royals.

=== 20th anniversary tour, Brian Doherty's death, ...But for the Sun (2018–2020) ===
In 2018, Big Wreck embarked on a 35-date North American tour to celebrate the 20th anniversary of In Loving Memory Of..., in which they performed every song from the album at each show. Attica Riots were the supporting act for the tour. The album was also physically reissued the same year featuring new artwork and two previously unreleased outtakes from the recording sessions, plus the album's first ever vinyl press.

On February 22, 2019, Big Wreck released a new single, "Locomotive", from their upcoming album, ...But for the Sun. In a promotional interview soon after, Ian Thornley revealed the titles of several other upcoming songs from the album, including "Follow Me," "Give Us a Smile," and "Found My Place." On May 10, 2019, the band released a follow-up single, entitled "Too Far Gone."

Brian Doherty (born on April 2, 1968) died of lung cancer on June 5, 2019, at age 51. The band performed their previously scheduled shows as a trio, with Chris Caddell joining the band later that year. On July 22, 2019, the band released a third single entitled "One More Chance," along with a release date and a tracklist of ...But for the Sun. The album was released on August 30, 2019. The band embarked on a 49-date tour in support of the record, with Texas King as the supporting act.

=== 7 (2020–2023) ===
In early 2021, Big Wreck announced that they had been working on new music for a follow-up to ...But for the Sun. They had recorded 15 songs for a new album, but had discussed releasing them in increments as opposed to the conventional full-length album format. This was due to Ian Thornley's belief in how music is consumed differently nowadays, and felt like fans would be able to take in the large amount of new material more easily by releasing a handful of songs at a time. It was also announced around this time that long-time drummer Chuck Keeping had left the group amicably to focus on family, and former Thornley drummer Sekou Lumumba had joined the band as their new drummer.

In the summer of 2021, the band released two one-off singles with the help of Chad Kroeger of Nickelback entitled "Middle of Nowhere" and "Ought to Be," the first of which became their highest charting single in Canada since "Albatross," peaking at #4. These songs were seen as a slight departure of style from the music the band usually releases, due to the more pop-influenced nature of the songs, similar to that of the Thornley albums from the 2000s. They would also be the final songs the band recorded with Chuck Keeping. The band also released their Bag of Tricks EP on limited edition coloured vinyl for Record Store Day.

On October 7, 2021, Big Wreck announced the upcoming release of 7.1, the first of three EPs (the latter consequently titled 7.2 and 7.3) that will be released individually and eventually put together to make the band's seventh full-length album. The lead single from the project "Bombs Away," was released the same day. A second single "Fields" (featuring Daniel Greaves of The Watchmen, and Ian D'Sa of Billy Talent on backing vocals) was released on November 12, 2021. 7.1 was released on November 19, 2021, and the band announced a 15-date tour of Canada. The first half of the tour was postponed to Spring 2022 due to the ongoing COVID-19 pandemic. BRKN LOVE and Monster Truck were the supporting acts for the tour. This was also the band's final campaign with Warner Music Canada before independently distributing and promoting their band under their own label, Big Wreck Music. The band released a cover of Sting's "Russians" to their Bandcamp website on March 4, 2022, in response to the ongoing Russo-Ukrainian War. All proceeds from the release were donated to the UNHRC. On May 6, 2022, the band released the third single of the project, entitled "Spit It Out," to Canadian radio stations. On June 1, 2022, the band announced the release 7.2 along with a campaign that allows people to pre-order the EP in several different formats, one of which featuring a bonus track. Each pre-order will allow people to enter a draw to win a turntable and with a one-off pressing of the EP. The same day, a fourth single "Better Off," was made available on streaming services. 7.2 was released on June 17, 2022. The band played various festivals and one-off summer shows to promote the EP. On September 30, 2022, the fifth single "Fear & Cowardice" was released to radio with a music video featuring live footage from an exclusive show at The Horseshoe Tavern that took place on July 21, 2022, Ian Thornley's 50th birthday. On November 24, 2022, bassist Dave McMillan hosted an exclusive livestream and confirmed that 7.3 would be released on March 24, 2023. On March 10, 2023, 7.3 was made available for digital pre-order and pre-save along with the sixth single of the project "Melody & Sound." 7.3 was released on March 24, 2023. The album was also released as a composite cassette with all three EPs put together. The band embarked on a tour with over 60 dates in support of 7 across Canada and the US over the course of the remainder of 2023. The Standstills, Texas King, Vilivant, and Daniel Greaves are supporting acts throughout the tour. On February 29, 2024, the band officially released 7 as a composite album to the general public as a triple vinyl gatefold package, a triple CD package, and a single cassette format. This officially concluded the release cycle of the record.

=== Pages, The Rest of the Story, Thornley reunion, and Record Store Day (2023–present) ===
On May 24, 2023, Ian Thornley shared in-studio footage on Instagram of Big Wreck recording what was speculated to be a follow-up to 7, with producer Nick Raskulinecz, who co-produced both Albatross and Ghosts with Big Wreck's long-time engineer and producer Eric Ratz. On October 4, 2023, the band officially announced their fourth studio EP, Pages, which consists of 6 out of 17 brand new songs that were recorded in two weeks. It was released on November 24, 2023 and was promoted with a 29-date North American tour. Texas King and Daniel Greaves were the supporting acts. Throughout 2024, Big Wreck performed many more shows to further promote the EP, including the single "Summerlong," which became the most successful single from the project and displayed, along with the rest of the EP, a deeper exploration of the band's new wave and progressive pop influences, featuring prominent synthesizers and gated drums. Ian Thornley hosted an exclusive Q&A session in the summer, where it was confirmed that the remaining 11 songs from the sessions will eventually be released as the band's eighth full-length album, titled The Rest of the Story, at some point in 2025. Pages received a nomination in the Best Rock Album category at the Juno Awards of 2025.

In May 2024, the band announced that they would be celebrating the 20th anniversary of the Thornley album Come Again by temporarily re-adopting the Thornley moniker for the first time in 13 years. Former guitarist Paulo Neta had rejoined the band as an intermittent touring member at this point. They performed two one-off shows in Canada, where they exclusively played songs from both Thornley albums, some of which have not been performed live since their release. The band also remastered and reissued the album on streaming services with previously unreleased bonus tracks, and on vinyl for the first time ever. The band then reverted back to the Big Wreck moniker and announced two more one-off shows for March 2025, billed as Big Wreck & Thornley. The band performed both as Thornley and as Big Wreck, opening for themselves and playing both respective eras of their catalogue.

The band was selected as Canada's 2025 Record Store Day ambassadors and released a deluxe anniversary reissue of Albatross. This reissue saw the album's first vinyl pressing, and features previously unreleased material.

On May 19, 2025, the band wiped their social media feeds and posted a countdown clock on their website, set to end at noon on May 23, 2025. The first single from The Rest of the Story was then released worldwide, titled "Believer." On July 18, 2025, a second single titled "Holy Roller," was released along with the official announcement of the album's release, October 24, 2025.

== Band members ==
=== Current ===
- Ian Thornley – lead vocals, lead guitar, keyboards (1992–2003, 2010–present)
- Dave McMillan – bass guitar, backing vocals (2010–present)
- Paulo Neta – lead and rhythm guitar, backing vocals (2010–2017, touring member 2024–present)
- Chris Caddell – rhythm guitar, backing vocals (2019–present)
- Brett Haggarty - drums (touring member 2026-present)

=== Past ===
- Brian Doherty – rhythm guitar, mandolin, banjo, backing vocals (1992–2003, 2010–2019; his death)
- Dave Henning – bass guitar, backing vocals (1992–2003)
- Forrest Williams – drums (1992–2003)
- Brad Park – drums (2011–2013)
- Chuck Keeping – drums (2013–2020)
- Sekou Lumumba – drums (2020–2026)

== Tours ==
- In Loving Memory of Tour (1997–1999)
- The Pleasure and the Greed Tour (2001–2002)
- An Evening with Ian Thornley and Big Wreck (2010)
- Albatross Tour (2012–2013)
- Ghosts Tour (2014)
- Summer Tour 2016
- Grace Street Tour (2017)
- In Loving Memory Of...20th Anniversary Tour (2018)
- Summer Tour 2018
- But for the Sun Tour (2019)
- 7 Tour (2021–2023)
- North American Tour 2023
- Summerlong Tour 2024

== Discography ==
=== Studio albums ===
Year	Title	Peak chart positions		Certifications
Year	Title	CAN	US Heatseekers	CAN
1997	In Loving Memory Of...	48	31	2× Platinum
2001	The Pleasure and the Greed	10	—	
2012	Albatross	5	25	Gold
2014	Ghosts	5	4	Gold
2017	Grace Street	5	8	
2019	...But for the Sun	5	5	
2023	7	—	—	
2025	The Rest of the Story	5	—	

=== Demos & EPs ===
- Big Wreck - Demo (1995)
- Bag of Tricks - Live EP (2013)
- 7.1 - EP (2021)
- 7.2 - EP (2022)
- 7.3 - EP (2023)
- Pages - EP (2023)

=== Singles ===
Year	Title	Peak chart positions					Album	
Year	Title	CAN	CAN Alt.	CAN Rock	US Mod	US Main	Album	
1997	"The Oaf (My Luck Is Wasted)"	21	3		24	9	In Loving Memory Of...	
1998	"That Song"	31	7		—	32	In Loving Memory Of...	
1998	"Blown Wide Open"	31	8		—	—	In Loving Memory Of...	
1998	"Under the Lighthouse" **	12	—	—	—	—	In Loving Memory Of...	
2001	"Inhale"	—	—	13	—	—	The Pleasure and the Greed	
2001	"Ladylike" **	—	—	—	×	—	The Pleasure and the Greed	
2002	"Knee Deep" **	—	—	—	×	—	The Pleasure and the Greed	
2011	"Albatross"	71	2	1	×	31	Albatross	
2012	"Wolves"	98	11	4	×	×	Albatross	
2012	"A Million Days"	×	35	8	×	×	Albatross	
2014	"Ghosts"	×	3	8	×	×	Ghosts	
2014	"Come What May"	×	—	—	×	×	Ghosts	
2014	"Hey Mama"	×	—	—	×	×	Ghosts	
2016	"One Good Piece of Me"	×	4	6	×	×	Grace Street	
2016	"Digging In"	×	—	35	×	×	Grace Street	
2017	"You Don't Even Know"	×	—	—	×	×	Grace Street	
2019	"Locomotive"	×	31	3	×	×	...But For the Sun	
2019	"Too Far Gone"	×	—	42	×	×	...But For the Sun	
2019	"One More Chance"	×	51	11	×	×	...But For the Sun	
2019	"Alibi"	×	—	—	×	×	...But For the Sun	
2021	"Middle of Nowhere" (feat. Chad Kroeger)	×	75	2	×	×	Non-album singles	
2021	"Ought to Be"	×	—	—	×	×	Non-album singles	
2021	"Bombs Away"	×	60	12	×	×	7.1	7
2021	"Fields"	×	—	—	×	×	7.1	7
2022	"Spit It Out"	×	—	46	×	×	7.2	7
2022	"Better Off"	×	—	—	×	×	7.2	7
2022	"Fear & Cowardice"	×	—	28	×	×	7.2	7
2023	"Melody & Sound"	×	—	—	×	×	7.3	7
2023	"Full Display"	×	—	—	×	×	7.3	7
2023	"Bail Out"	×	—	20	×	×	Pages	
2024	"Summerlong"	×	34	19	×	×	Pages	
2025	"Believer"	×	41	3	×	×	The Rest of the Story	
2025	"Holy Roller"	×	—	11	×	×	The Rest of the Story	
2025	"Around"	×	—	21	×	×	The Rest of the Story	
2025	"Dog With A Gun"	×	—	5	×	×	The Rest of the Story	
" ** " denotes singles that were released as promo singles in Canada only. "—" denotes releases that did not chart. "×" denotes periods where charts did not exist or were not archived.

=== Music videos ===
List of music videos, showing year released and director(s) name
Title	Year	Director(s)
"The Oaf (My Luck Is Wasted)"	1997	Unknown
"That Song"	1998	Unknown
"Blown Wide Open"	1998	Ulf
"Inhale"	2001	Unknown
"Ladylike"	2001	Unknown
"Knee Deep"	2002	Unknown
"Albatross"	2011	Micha Dahan
"Control"	2011	Micha Dahan
"Wolves"	2012	Micha Dahan
"A Million Days"	2012	Micha Dahan
"Ghosts"	2014	Brad Conrad & George Vale
"Come What May"	2014	Brad Conrad & George Vale
"Hey Mama"	2014	Tyler Tasson
"One Good Piece of Me"	2016	Nikki Ormerod
"You Don't Even Know"	2017	Unknown
"Too Far Gone"	2019	Mike Regis
"One More Chance"	2019	Mike Regis
"Locomotive"	2019	Ian Keteku
"Alibi"	2020	Adam Jones
"Fear & Cowardice"	2022	Adam Jones
"Believer"	2025	Justin Alexis
"Holy Roller"	2025	Alex McFarland
"Around"	2026	Unknown

== See also ==
- Canadian rock
