= Ghosts (Big Wreck album) =

Studio album by Big Wreck
- Released: June 10, 2014 (CAN); July 15, 2014 (US)
- Recorded: at Revolution Studios, Vespa Studios, Toronto
- Genre: Alternative rock, progressive rock, blues rock, heartland rock
- Length: 69:48
- Label: Anthem, Warner Music Canada
- Producer: Ian Thornley, Nick Raskulinecz, Eric Ratz

Big Wreck chronology
| Albatross (2012) | Ghosts (2014) | Grace Street (2017) |

Singles from Ghosts
- 1. "Ghosts" Released: April 8, 2014; 2. "Come What May" Released: July 15, 2014; 3. "Hey Mama" Released: October 20, 2014

Ghosts is the fourth studio album by Canadian rock band Big Wreck. The album was announced on April 8, 2014, with the title track "Ghosts" being released as the lead single the same day. The album was nominated for "Rock Album of the Year" at the 2015 Juno Awards.

== Commercial performance ==
The album debuted at #5 on the Canadian Albums Chart, selling 4,000 copies in its first week. The album also debuted at #4 on the Billboard Heatseekers chart, which is the band's highest position on that chart in their history.

The album's title track was certified Gold in Canada in 2025.

Professional ratings
Review scores
| Source | Rating |
|---|---|
| AllMusic | 3.5/5 stars |

== Track listing ==
| No. | Title | Length |
|---|---|---|
| 1. | "A Place to Call Home" | 7:41 |
| 2. | "I Digress" | 4:32 |
| 3. | "Ghosts" | 6:10 |
| 4. | "My Life" | 4:26 |
| 5. | "Hey Mama" | 6:19 |
| 6. | "Diamonds" | 5:09 |
| 7. | "Friends" | 5:44 |
| 8. | "Still Here" | 7:46 |
| 9. | "Break" | 5:28 |
| 10. | "Off and Running" | 5:10 |
| 11. | "Come What May" | 3:13 |
| 12. | "War Baby" | 7:03 |
| 13. | "A Place to Call Home (Reprise)" | 1:07 |
| Total length: | | 69:48 |

== Personnel ==
Big Wreck

- Ian Thornley – vocals, lead guitar, keyboards
- Brian Doherty – rhythm guitar
- Paulo Neta – lead & rhythm guitar, backing vocals
- David McMillan – bass guitar
- Chuck Keeping – drums, percussion

== Charts ==
| Chart (2014) | Peak position |
|---|---|
| Canadian Albums (Billboard) | 5 |
| US Heatseekers Albums (Billboard) | 4 |
