= Eric Ratz =

Canadian producer, engineer, and mixer (born 1970)

- Born: 1970 (age 54–55)
- Origin: Toronto, Ontario, Canada
- Genres: Rock, heavy metal, punk
- Occupation(s): Producer, engineer, mixer
- Years active: 1990–present

Eric Ratz is a Canadian producer, engineer, and mixer. He has won multiple Grammy and Juno awards. Throughout his career, Ratz has worked with some of Canada's most successful and influential rock bands, including Arkells, Big Wreck, Billy Talent, Cancer Bats, Danko Jones, and Monster Truck. He has been nominated for 11 Juno awards in both the Producer and Recording Engineer categories. He has won the Jack Richardson Producer of the Year Award, two Recording Engineer of the Year Juno Awards, and a Grammy award.

== Awards and nominations ==
=== Grammy Awards ===
The Grammy Awards are presented by The Recording Academy. Ratz was an engineer in both of the nominees.

| Year | Nominee / work | Award | Result |
|---|---|---|---|
| 1997 | Enrique Iglesias - Enrique Iglesias | Best Latin Pop Album | Won |
| 1998 | Enrique Iglesias - Vivir | Best Latin Pop Album | Nominated |

=== Juno Awards ===
The Juno Awards are administered by the Canadian Academy of Recording Arts and Sciences (CARAS).

==== Music awards ====
| Year | Nominee / work | Award | Result |
|---|---|---|---|
| 1997 | Big Sugar - Hemi-Vision - Engineer/Mixer | Rock Album of the Year | Nominated |
| 2000 | Danko Jones - My Love Is Bold - Engineer/Mixer | Best Alternative Album | Nominated |
| 2001 | Sarah Harmer - You Were Here - Mixer | Best Pop Album | Nominated |
| 2005 | Sarah Slean - Day One - Mixer | Adult Alternative Album of the Year | Nominated |
| 2005 | Sarah Harmer - All Of Our Names - Engineer/Mixer | Adult Alternative Album of the Year | Won |
| 2005 | Thornley - Come Again - Engineer | Rock Album of the Year | Nominated |
| 2005 | The Tea Party - Seven Circles - Engineer | Rock Album of the Year | Nominated |
| 2007 | Billy Talent - Devil In A Midnight Mass - Engineer | Single of the Year | Nominated |
| 2007 | Billy Talent - Billy Talent II - Engineer | Rock Album of the Year | Won |
| 2007 | Billy Talent - Billy Talent II - Engineer | Album of the Year | Nominated |
| 2008 | Billy Talent - 666 Live - Audio Producer | Music DVD of the Year | Won |
| 2010 | Stereos - Stereos - Engineer | Pop Album of the Year | Nominated |
| 2010 | Metric - Fantasies - Engineer | Alternative Album of the Year | Won |
| 2010 | Billy Talent - Billy Talent III - Engineer | Album of the Year | Nominated |
| 2010 | Billy Talent - Billy Talent III - Engineer | Rock Album of the Year | Won |
| 2011 | Cancer Bats - Bears, Mayors, Scraps and Bones - Producer | Rock Album of the Year | Nominated |
| 2013 | Billy Talent - Viking Death March - Engineer | Single of the Year | Nominated |
| 2013 | Cancer Bats - Dead Set On Living - Producer | Metal/Hard Music Album of the Year | Nominated |
| 2013 | Billy Talent - Dead Silence - Engineer | Rock Album of the Year | Nominated |
| 2013 | Big Wreck - Albatross - Producer | Rock Album of the Year | Nominated |
| 2013 | Monster Truck - Producer | Breakthrough Group of the Year | Won |
| 2014 | Monster Truck - Furiosity - Producer | Rock Album of the Year | Nominated |
| 2015 | Skull Fist - Chasing the Dream - Mixer | Metal/Hard Music Album of the Year | Nominated |
| 2015 | Big Wreck - Ghosts - Producer | Rock Album of the Year | Nominated |
| 2015 | Arkells - High Noon - Producer | Rock Album of the Year | Won |
| 2015 | Arkells - Producer | Group of the Year | Won |
| 2016 | Diemonds - Never Wanna Die - Producer | Heavy Metal Album of the Year | Nominated |
| 2017 | Monster Truck - Sittin' Heavy - Producer | Rock Album of the Year | Nominated |
| 2017 | Billy Talent - Afraid of Heights - Engineer | Rock Album of the Year | Nominated |
| 2017 | Billy Talent - Engineer | Group of the Year | Nominated |
| 2017 | Mandroid Echostar - Coral Throne - Producer | Metal/Hard Music Album of the Year | Won |
| 2018 | Splash'N Boots - Love, Kisses and Hugs - Producer | Children's Album of the Year | Nominated |
| 2018 | Arkells - Knocking at the Door - Producer | Video of the Year | Nominated |
| 2018 | Arkells - Knocking at the Door - Producer | Single of the Year | Nominated |
| 2019 | Arkells - Producer | Group of the Year | Won |
| 2019 | Cancer Bats - The Spark That Moves - Engineer | Metal/Hard Music Album of the Year | Nominated |
| 2019 | Monster Truck - True Rockers - Engineer | Rock Album of the Year | Nominated |
| 2019 | Arkells - Rally Cry - Producer | Rock Album of the Year | Won |

==== Producer and recording engineer awards ====
| Year | Nominee / work | Award | Result | Ref. |
|---|---|---|---|---|
| 2005 | "Lucky Me" and "Day One" by Sarah Slean | Recording Engineer of the Year | Nominated | |
| 2007 | "Devil in a Midnight Mass" and "Red Flag" By Billy Talent | Recording Engineer of the Year | Nominated | |
| 2013 | "Albatross" by Big Wreck and "Surprise, Surprise!" By Billy Talent | Recording Engineer of the Year | Nominated | |
| 2014 | "Sweet Mountain River" and "The Lion" by Monster Truck | Recording Engineer of the Year | Won | |
| 2014 | "Sweet Mountain River" and "The Lion" by Monster Truck | Jack Richardson Producer of the Year | Nominated | |
| 2015 | "Ghosts" by Big Wreck and "Satellite Hotel" by One Bad Son | Recording Engineer of the Year | Won | |
| 2015 | "Leather Jacket" by Arkells and "Ghosts" by Big Wreck | Jack Richardson Producer of the Year | Nominated | |
| 2017 | "Afraid of Heights" by Billy Talent and "Don't Tell me How to Live" by Monster Truck | Recording Engineer of the Year | Nominated | |
| 2017 | "The Enforcer" by Monster Truck and "Fever" by Royal Tusk | Jack Richardson Producer of the Year | Nominated | |
| 2018 | "Knocking at the Door" by Arkells and "My Little RnR" by Danko Jones | Recording Engineer of the Year | Nominated | |
| 2019 | "People's Champ" and "Relentless" by Arkells | Jack Richardson Producer of the Year | Won | |
