= In Loving Memory Of... =

Studio album by Big Wreck
- Released: October 7, 1997
- Studios: Presence Studios, Toronto, Ontario
- Genres: Alternative rock, progressive rock, blues rock, post-grunge
- Length: 60:34
- Labels: WEA, Atlantic
- Producers: Matt DeMatteo, Big Wreck, Chris Wardman

Big Wreck chronology
In Loving Memory Of... (1997)	The Pleasure and the Greed (2001)

Singles from In Loving Memory Of...
- 1. "The Oaf (My Luck Is Wasted)" Released: September 29, 1997

Professional ratings
Review scores
Source	Rating
Allmusic	3/5 stars

In Loving Memory Of... is the debut studio album by American-Canadian rock band Big Wreck. Released in 1997, the album features the single "The Oaf," which became a Top Ten hit in the U.S. Subsequent singles, "That Song" and "Blown Wide Open", found airplay in the United States but experienced greater success in Canada where they both reached the Top Ten on the country's alternative chart. "Under the Lighthouse" was released as a single exclusively in Canada.

In Loving Memory Of... features layered progressive elements in addition to its heavy Southern rock style. Lyrically, it deals predominantly with relationship issues. Frontman Ian Thornley noted, "The majority of the album is actually written about one girl. Somebody who's still fucking me up." He also admitted that the track "Look What I Found" was intended to sound like Soundgarden as a reference to how popular bands gain fame emulating other groups.

To promote their debut album, Big Wreck opened for progressive metal band Dream Theater in what was their first major national tour.

In 2018, Big Wreck embarked on a 35-date North American tour to celebrate the 20th anniversary of In Loving Memory Of..., in which they performed every song from the album at each show. The album was also reissued the same year with new artwork and two previously unreleased outtakes from the recording sessions. This reissue also saw the album's first vinyl press.

== Track listing ==
All lyrics are written by Ian Thornley; all music is composed by Ian Thornley except where noted.

No.	Title	Music	Length
1.	"The Oaf"		4:39
2.	"That Song"		5:04
3.	"Look What I Found"		4:57
4.	"Blown Wide Open"		5:55
5.	"How Would You Know"	Ian Thornley, Brian Doherty	4:36
6.	"Oh My"		3:25
7.	"Under the Lighthouse"	Forrest Williams	4:11
8.	"Fall Through the Cracks"	Ian Thornley, David Henning	4:20
9.	"Waste"	Ian Thornley, Brian Doherty	4:00
10.	"By the Way"		5:10
11.	"Between You and I"		3:45
12.	"Prayer"		3:49
13.	"Overemphasizing"		6:43
Total length:			60:34

Outtakes released for the 20th anniversary edition
No.	Title	Original single release	Length
14.	"Ill Advice"	"That Song" (Japanese release only)	4:03
15.	"Still Holding" (Demo)	"The Oaf" (Japanese release only)	4:00
Total length:			68:37

"Fall Through the Cracks" and "Overemphasizing" were produced by Chris Wardman.

All other tracks produced by Matt DeMatteo.

== Personnel ==
- Ian Thornley — vocals, lead guitar, mando guitar, keyboards, drums (on "By the Way")
- Brian Doherty — guitar
- David Henning — bass
- Forrest Williams — drums

== Charts ==
=== Weekly charts ===
Chart (1998)	Peak position
Canada Top Albums/CDs (RPM)	48
US Heatseekers Albums (Billboard)	31

=== Year-end charts ===
1998 year-end chart performance for In Loving Memory Of...
Chart (1998)	Position
Canada Top Albums/CDs (RPM)	70

== Certifications ==
Region	Certification	Certified units/sales
Canada (Music Canada)	2× Platinum	200,000^{^}
^{^} Shipments figures based on certification alone.
