= Albatross (Big Wreck album) =

Studio album by Big Wreck
- Released: March 6, 2012 (CAN); February 19, 2013 (US)
- Genre: Alternative rock, progressive rock, post-grunge, heartland rock
- Length: 49:29
- Label: Anthem, Warner Music Canada
- Producer: Ian Thornley, Nick Raskulinecz, Eric Ratz

Big Wreck chronology
The Pleasure and the Greed (2001)	Albatross (2012)	Ghosts (2014)

Singles from Albatross
- 1. "Albatross" Released: November 21, 2011; 2. "Wolves" Released: 2012; 3. "A Million Days" Released: 2012

Albatross is the third studio album by Canadian rock band Big Wreck. It is the band's first album since their 2001 release The Pleasure and the Greed, and the first without original members Dave Henning and Forrest Williams, but the first to feature long-time bass guitarist Dave McMillan. The drums on the record were performed by session musician Christopher Henry. Drummer Brad Park played on the following tour. The album was released on March 6, 2012.

In 2012, the album won the CASBY Award for "Favourite New Album". The album was nominated for Rock Album of the Year at the 2013 Juno Awards.

In 2025, the band were selected as Canada's Record Store Day ambassadors for the year, and announced a deluxe anniversary reissue of the album, which saw its first ever vinyl pressing and features several previously unreleased songs.

Professional ratings
Review scores
Source	Rating
AllMusic	3.5/5 stars
PopMatters	7/10 stars

== Commercial performance ==
Albatross debuted at #5 on the Canadian Albums Chart. This is the highest position ever for any album by Big Wreck or Ian Thornley on that chart. The album also peaked at #25 on the Billboard Heatseekers chart. The album was certified Gold in Canada.

== Track listing ==
No.	Title	Length
1.	"Head Together"	3:54
2.	"A Million Days"	4:25
3.	"Wolves"	4:13
4.	"Albatross"	4:14
5.	"Glass Room"	4:57
6.	"All is Fair"	5:08
7.	"Control"	6:35
8.	"Rest of the World"	2:51
9.	"You Caught My Eye"	5:29
10.	"Do What You Will"	3:37
11.	"Time"	4:06
Total length:		49:29

2025 Anniversary Edition bonus tracks

No.	Title	Length
12.	"Wolves (Alternate Version)"	4:10
13.	"Albatross (Alternate Version)"	3:46
14.	"A Million Days (Alternate Version)"	4:24
15.	"Fade Away"	3:45
16.	"Albatross (Live at Suhr Guitar Factory)"	5:07
Total length:		70:45

== Personnel ==
Big Wreck

- Ian Thornley – vocals, lead guitar, keyboards
- Brian Doherty – rhythm guitar
- Paulo Neta – lead & rhythm guitar, backing vocals
- David McMillan – bass guitar
- Christopher Henry – drums, percussion (session musician)

== Charts ==
Chart (2012)	Peak position
Canadian Albums (Billboard)	5
US Heatseekers Albums (Billboard)	25

== Certifications ==
Region	Certification	Certified units/sales
Canada (Music Canada)	Gold	40,000^{‡}
^{‡} Sales+streaming figures based on certification alone.
