= Ian Thornley =

Canadian musician (born 1972)

- Born: Ian Fletcher Thornley; July 21, 1972 (age 54); Toronto, Canada
- Genres: Rock; hard rock; alternative rock; post-grunge
- Occupations: Musician, songwriter
- Instruments: Guitar; vocals
- Years active: 1993–present
- Labels: Anthem; Warner
- Member of: Big Wreck
- Formerly of: Thornley
- Website: bigwreckmusic.com

Ian Thornley (born July 21, 1972) is a Canadian rock guitarist, vocalist, and songwriter. He is best known for his work with the bands Big Wreck and Thornley.

== Career ==
Born and raised in Toronto, Ontario, Thornley studied jazz music at Boston's Berklee College of Music in the 1990s and formed the band Big Wreck in 1993 with classmates David Henning, Brian Doherty, and Forrest Williams. They soon relocated from Boston to Toronto and eventually signed a US record deal with Atlantic Records. Their 1997 debut album, In Loving Memory Of..., was a significant hit that year on rock radio in both Canada and the US. Big Wreck released a follow-up in 2001, called The Pleasure and the Greed, and broke up in 2002.

The same year, Thornley auditioned with Velvet Revolver for the position of lead singer. He later stated that he did not feel comfortable singing without playing guitar. The band eventually chose Scott Weiland as their vocalist.

Later in 2002, Thornley formed a new band, simply titled Thornley, which released their first album, Come Again, in 2004. Their follow-up record, Tiny Pictures, was published in Canada on February 10, 2009, via 604 Records. It was produced and mixed by Nick Raskulinecz.

Ian Thornley left 604 Records in 2011 and signed with Anthem Records. During this time, he reunited with his former Big Wreck bandmate Brian Doherty to resurrect the group. They began work on a new album, entitled Albatross, which was released on March 6, 2012. The group toured Canada from April to July.

Big Wreck released their fourth studio album, Ghosts, in Canada on June 10, 2014, and in the US on July 15. It debuted at No. 5 on the Canadian Albums Chart, selling 4,000 copies in its first week.

In 2015, Thornley published the album Secrets under the name Ian Fletcher Thornley.

Big Wreck has since released the albums Grace Street (2017), ...But for the Sun (2019), 7 (2023), Pages (2023), and The Rest of the Story (2025).

== Discography ==
=== Big Wreck ===
Year	Album
1997	In Loving Memory Of...
2001	The Pleasure and the Greed
2012	Albatross
2014	Ghosts
2017	Grace Street
2019	...But for the Sun
2023	7
2023	Pages
2025	The Rest of the Story

=== Thornley ===
Year	Album
2004	Come Again
2009	Tiny Pictures

=== Solo (as Ian Fletcher Thornley) ===
Year	Album
2015	Secrets
