= Juno Award for Rock Album of the Year =

Canadian music award

The Juno Award for "Rock Album of the Year" has been awarded since 1991, as recognition each year for the best rock album in Canada. The award has been called a number of other names, including the "Best Hard Rock/Metal Album" and "Best Rock Album".

== Winners ==
=== Best Hard Rock/Metal Album (1991) ===
Year	Performing artist(s)	Work	Nominees	Ref.
1991	Rush	Presto	Lee Aaron, Bodyrock; Andy Curran, Andy Curran; Killer Dwarfs, Dirty Weapons; Voivod, Nothingface	

=== Hard Rock Album of the Year (1992 - 1993) ===
Year	Performing artist(s)	Work	Nominees	Ref.
1992	Rush	Roll the Bones	Lee Aaron, Some Girls Do; Big House, Big House; Brighton Rock, Love Machine; Chrissy Steele, Magnet to Steele	
1993	Slik Toxik	Doin' the Nasty	Killer Dwarfs, Method to the Madness; Sven Gali, Sven Gali; Triumph, Edge of Excess; Voivod, Angel Rat	

=== Best Hard Rock Album (1994 - 1995) ===
Year	Performing artist(s)	Work	Nominees	Ref.
1994	I Mother Earth	Dig	Doughboys, Crush; Rush, Counterparts; The Tea Party, Splendor Solis; Wild T and the Spirit, Givin Blood	
1995	Monster Voodoo Machine	Suffersystem	Econoline Crush, Purge; Front Line Assembly, Millennium; Malhavoc, Get Down; Varga, Prototype	

=== Best Rock Album (1996) ===
Year	Performing artist(s)	Work	Nominees	Ref.
1996	Alanis Morissette	Jagged Little Pill	Headstones, Teeth and Tissue; Odds, Good Weird Feeling; The Tea Party, The Edges of Twilight; Neil Young, Mirror Ball	

=== North Star Rock Album of the Year (1997) ===
Year	Performing artist(s)	Work	Nominees	Ref.
1997	The Tragically Hip	Trouble at the Henhouse	Big Sugar, Hemi-Vision; I Mother Earth, Scenery and Fish; Rush, Test for Echo; The Watchmen, Brand New Day	

=== Blockbuster Rock Album of the Year (1998) ===
Year	Performing artist(s)	Work	Nominees	Ref.
1998	Our Lady Peace	Clumsy	Econoline Crush, The Devil You Know; Headstones, Smile and Wave; Moist, Creature; The Tea Party, Transmission	

=== Best Rock Album (1999 - 2002) ===
Year	Performing artist(s)	Work	Nominees	Ref.
1999	The Tragically Hip	Phantom Power	54-40, Since When; Matthew Good Band, Underdogs; Sloan, Navy Blues; The Watchmen, Silent Radar	
2000	Matthew Good Band	Beautiful Midnight	Edwin, Another Spin Around the Sun; Moist, Mercedes 5 and Dime; Our Lady Peace, Happiness...Is Not a Fish That You Can Catch; The Tea Party, Triptych	
2001	The Tragically Hip	Music @ Work	54-40, Casual Viewin'; Finger Eleven, The Greyest of Blue Skies; Treble Charger, Wide Awake Bored; Wide Mouth Mason, Stew	
2002	Nickelback	Silver Side Up	Bif Naked, Purge; Big Sugar, Brothers and Sisters, Are You Ready?; Sloan, Pretty Together; Sum 41, All Killer No Filler	

=== Rock Album of the Year (2003 - Present) ===
Year	Performing artist(s)	Work	Nominees	Ref.
2003	Our Lady Peace	Gravity	Danko Jones, Born a Lion; The Tea Party, The Interzone Mantras; Treble Charger, Detox; Wide Mouth Mason, Rained Out Parade	
2004	Sam Roberts	We Were Born in a Flame	Billy Talent, Billy Talent; Danko Jones, We Sweat Blood; Nickelback, The Long Road; Sum 41, Does This Look Infected?	
2005	Sum 41	Chuck	Default, Elocation; Thornley, Come Again; The Tea Party, Seven Circles; The Tragically Hip, In Between Evolution	
2006	Nickelback	All the Right Reasons	Hedley, Hedley; Jonas, Jonas; Our Lady Peace, Healthy in Paranoid Times; Theory of a Deadman, Gasoline	
2007	Billy Talent	Billy Talent II	Mobile, Tomorrow Starts Today; Sam Roberts, Chemical City; Sloan, Never Hear the End of It; The Tragically Hip, World Container	
2008	Finger Eleven	Them vs. You vs. Me	Matthew Good, Hospital Music; Pride Tiger, The Lucky Ones; The Saint Alvia Cartel, The Saint Alvia Cartel; Sum 41, Underclass Hero	
2009	Sam Roberts	Love at the End of the World	Matt Mays & El Torpedo, Terminal Romance; Protest the Hero, Fortress; Sloan, Parallel Play; The Trews, No Time for Later	
2010	Billy Talent	Billy Talent III	Alexisonfire, Old Crows/Young Cardinals; Nickelback, Dark Horse; Three Days Grace, Life Starts Now; The Tragically Hip, We Are the Same	
2011	Matthew Good	Vancouver	Cancer Bats, Bears, Mayors, Scraps & Bones; Die Mannequin, Fino + Bleed; Finger Eleven, Life Turns Electric; Hail the Villain, Population: Declining	
2012	The Sheepdogs	Learn & Burn	Arkells, Michigan Left; Matthew Good, Lights of Endangered Species; Sam Roberts, Collider; Sloan, The Double Cross	
2013	Rush	Clockwork Angels	Big Wreck, Albatross; Billy Talent, Dead Silence; The Sheepdogs, The Sheepdogs; The Tragically Hip, Now for Plan A	
2014	Matt Mays	Coyote	Headstones, Love + Fury; Matthew Good, Arrows of Desire; Monster Truck, Furiosity; Three Days Grace, Transit of Venus	
2015	Arkells	High Noon	Big Wreck, Ghosts; Sam Roberts Band, Lo-Fantasy; The Glorious Sons, The Union; Your Favorite Enemies, Between Illness and Migration	
2016	Death from Above 1979	The Physical World	Bryan Adams, Get Up; Matthew Good, Chaotic Neutral; Nickelback, No Fixed Address; The Sheepdogs, Future Nostalgia	
2017	The Tragically Hip	Man Machine Poem	Arkells, Morning Report; Billy Talent, Afraid of Heights; Monster Truck, Sittin' Heavy; Sam Roberts Band, Terraform	
2018	The Glorious Sons	Young Beauties and Fools	Big Wreck, Grace Street; Death from Above, Outrage! Is Now; Nickelback, Feed the Machine; Theory, Wake Up Call	
2019	Arkells	Rally Cry	Monster Truck, True Rockers; The Sheepdogs, Changing Colours; The Trews, Civilianaires; Three Days Grace, Outsider	
2020	The Glorious Sons	A War on Everything	Big Wreck, ...but for the sun; The Dirty Nil, Master Volume; Headstones, Peopleskills; Sum 41, Order in Decline	
2021	JJ Wilde	Ruthless	Crown Lands, Crown Lands; Sam Roberts Band, All of Us; Silverstein, A Beautiful Place to Drown; Neil Young and Crazy Horse, Colorado	
2022	The Beaches	Sisters Not Twins (The Professional Lovers Album)	Arkells, Blink Once; Black Pistol Fire, Look Alive; The Blue Stones, Hidden Gems; The Dirty Nil, Fuck Art	
2023	Alexisonfire	Otherness	Billy Talent, Crisis of Faith; Nickelback, Get Rollin'; The Sheepdogs, Outta Sight; Three Days Grace, Explosions	
2024	The Beaches	Blame My Ex	The Blue Stones, Pretty Monster; Crown Lands, Fearless; The Glorious Sons, Glory; Metric, Formentera II	
2025	Nobro	Set Your Pussy Free	Big Wreck, Pages; Mother Mother, Grief Chapter; Sum 41, Heaven :x: Hell; JJ Wilde, Vices	
2026	The Beaches	No Hard Feelings	Bryan Adams, Roll with the Punches; The Blue Stones, Metro; The Damn Truth, The Damn Truth; grandson, Inertia; Three Days Grace, Alienation	

== See also ==
- Category:Canadian rock music groups
- Category:Canadian rock musicians
