= Juno Awards of 2012 =

Canadian music awards ceremony

- Date: 31 March – 1 April 2012
- Venue: Scotiabank Place, Ottawa, Ontario
- Hosted by: William Shatner

Television/radio coverage
- Network: CTV

The Juno Awards of 2012 honoured Canadian music industry achievements in the latter part of 2010 and in most of 2011. The awards were presented in Ottawa, Ontario, Canada during the weekend of 31 March and 1 April 2012. A week of related events began on 26 March 2012.

Blue Rodeo was inducted into the Canadian Music Hall of Fame. Broadcast executive Gary Slaight was designated the 2012 recipient of the Walt Grealis Special Achievement Award.

== Bidding ==
Ottawa's bid for the awards became known in March 2011 when it was revealed the province of Ontario allocated $100,000 in funding towards the city's 2012 Juno Awards bid. The bid was jointly supported by the city, the province and the National Capital Commission. Ottawa hosted the awards on one other occasion, in 2003.

Montreal was also considered as a 2012 host city. There was a bid from Victoria, British Columbia for the 2013 awards which was since granted to Regina. Victoria then planned a bid for 2014.

== Events ==
The Juno Cup charity hockey game between a team of musicians and a team of former National Hockey League players was held at Nepean Sportsplex on 30 March.

Winners of most award categories were announced at a private gala on 31 March at the Ottawa Convention Centre.

On 1 April, prior to the main ceremony, Dan Mangan hosted a songwriters' event at Centrepointe Theatre featuring Kiran Ahluwalia, Terri Clark, David Francey, Max Kerman of Arkells, Kardinall Offishall and Lindi Ortega.

=== Main ceremony performers ===
William Shatner hosted the main ceremony at Scotiabank Place. The following artists performed:

- Nickelback - "This Means War"
- Hey Rosetta! - "Welcome"
- Dragonette - "Hello"
- Alyssa Reid - "Alone Again"
- JRDN - "U Can Have It All"
- Mia Martina - "Stereo Love"
- Anjulie - "Brand New Chick"
- Simple Plan - "Summer Paradise" ft. K'naan
- Hedley - "One Life"
- Feist - "The Bad in Each Other"
- City and Colour - "Grand Optimist"
- Blue Rodeo - "Lost Together" ft. Sarah McLachlan
- deadmau5 - "Raise Your Weapon" with Lights, and "Hi Friend" with MC Flipside

== Nominees and winners ==
Nominations for the various award categories were announced on 7 February 2012. Most awards were announced at the private gala on 31 March. The remaining eight categories were announced the following day on the main televised ceremony. Two Christmas holiday albums were nominated for the Album of the Year award: Christmas by Michael Bublé and Under the Mistletoe by Justin Bieber. A Metal/Hard Music Album of the Year category was introduced for the 2012 awards.

=== People ===
==== Juno Fan Choice Award ====
- Justin Bieber
- Arcade Fire
- Michael Bublé
- City and Colour
- Deadmau5
- Drake
- Hedley
- Avril Lavigne
- Nickelback
- Ginette Reno

==== Artist of the Year ====
- Feist
- City and Colour
- Deadmau5
- Drake
- Michael Bublé

==== Group of the Year ====
- Arkells
- Down with Webster
- Hedley
- Nickelback
- Sam Roberts Band

==== New Artist of the Year ====
- Dan Mangan
- Diamond Rings
- JRDN
- Lindi Ortega
- Alyssa Reid

==== New Group of the Year ====
- The Sheepdogs
- Braids
- Hey Rosetta!
- Mother Mother
- The Rural Alberta Advantage

==== Jack Richardson Producer of the Year ====
- Brian Howes ("Heaven's Gonna Wait", Hedley and "Trying Not to Love You", Nickelback)
- David Foster ("White Christmas", Michael Bublé)
- k.d. lang ("I Confess" and "Sugar Buzz", k.d. lang)
- Bob Rock ("Only the Lonely", Jann Arden)
- Noah "40" Shebib ("Marvin's Room" and "Take Care", Drake)

==== Recording Engineer of the Year ====
- George Seara ("A Little Bit of Love", Michael Kaeshammer and "Let Go", Laila Biali)
- Chris Shreenan-Dyck ("Everybody Watched the Wedding" and "Watch Yourself Go", Jim Cuddy)
- David Travers-Smith ("All the Stars", The Wailin' Jennys and "Soon the Birds", Oh Susanna)
- Michael Phillip Wojewoda ("Circle" and "Mama", Paisley Jura)
- Jeff Wolpert ("You're Not Alone" and "Cosmic Ballet", Sarah Slean)

==== Songwriter of the Year ====
- Dallas Green, "Fragile Bird", "We Found Each Other" and "Weightless"
- Jim Cuddy, "Everyone Watched the Wedding", "Skyscraper Soul" and "Watch Yourself Go Down"
- Feist, "How Come You Never Go There", "Graveyard" and "The Circle Married the Line"
- Dan Mangan, "About as Helpful As You Can Be Without Being Any Help at All", "Post-War Blues" and "Oh Fortune"
- Ron Sexsmith, "Get in Line", "Believe it When I See It" and "Middle of Love"

==== Allan Waters Humanitarian Award ====
- Simple Plan

=== Albums ===
==== Album of the Year ====
- Michael Bublé, Christmas
- Justin Bieber, Under the Mistletoe
- Drake, Take Care
- Avril Lavigne, Goodbye Lullaby
- Nickelback, Here and Now

==== Aboriginal Album of the Year ====
- Murray Porter, Songs Lived and Life Played
- Bruthers of Different Muthers, Speakers of Tomorrow
- Flying Down Thunder and Rise Ashen, One Nation
- Donny Parenteau, To Whom it May Concern
- Randy Wood, The Gift of Life

==== Adult Alternative Album of the Year ====
- Feist, Metals
- Jim Cuddy, Skyscraper Soul
- Cuff the Duke, Morning Comes
- Jenn Grant, Honeymoon Punch
- Ron Sexsmith, Long Player Late Bloomer

==== Alternative Album of the Year ====
- Dan Mangan, Oh Fortune
- Braids, Native Speaker
- Destroyer, Kaputt
- Fucked Up, David Comes to Life
- Timber Timbre, Creep on Creepin' On

==== Blues Album of the Year ====
- MonkeyJunk, To Behold
- Bill Johnson, Still Blue
- David Gogo, Soul Bender
- Harrison Kennedy, Shame the Devil
- Suzie Vinnick, Me 'n' Mabel

==== Children's Album of the Year ====
- Charlie Hope, Songs, Stories and Friends: Let's Go Play!
- Bobs & Lolo, Connecting the Dots
- Eddie Douglas, Sleepy Sky Lullaby
- Music with Brian, Everyone
- Vocal Paint, My Butterfly/A Cappella Lullabies

==== Classical Album of the Year (solo or chamber ensemble) ====
- Marc-André Hamelin, Liszt Piano Sonata
- Canadian Brass, Brahms on Brass
- Susan Hoeppner, American Flute Masterpieces
- Louis Lortie, Louis Lortie Plays Liszt
- New Orford String Quartet, Schubert and Beethoven

==== Classical Album of the Year (large ensemble) ====
- Alexandre Da Costa with the Montreal Symphony Orchestra, Daugherty: Fire and Blood
- James Ehnes, Bartók Violin Concertos
- Yannick Nézet-Séguin with the Orchestre Métropolitain, Bruckner 4
- Yannick Nézet-Séguin with the Orchestre Métropolitain, Florent Schmidt: La tragédie de Salomé
- Jean-Guihen Queyras, Vivaldi Cello Concertos

==== Classical Album of the Year (vocal or choral performance) ====
- Jane Archibald with the Orchestre Symphonique Bienne (Thomas Rösner, conductor), Haydn Arias
- Karina Gauvin and Marie-Nicole Lemieux, Handel: Streams of Pleasure
- Marie-Josée Lord and the Orchestre Métropolitain (Giuseppe Pietraroia, conductor), Marie-Josée Lord
- Le Nouvel Opéra, Caldara: La Conversione di Clodoveo
- Tafelmusik Baroque Orchestra with Daniel Taylor, J.S. Bach: Cantatas 70 & 154; Concerto 1060; Orchestral Suite No. 2

==== Contemporary Christian/Gospel Album of the Year ====
- Downhere, On the Altar of Love
- Jon Bauer, Forevermore
- Hawk Nelson, Crazy Love
- Kellie Loder, Imperfections & Directions
- Sky Terminal, Don't Close Your Eyes

==== Country Album of the Year ====
- Terri Clark, Roots and Wings
- Doc Walker, 16 & 1
- High Valley, High Valley
- Jason McCoy, Everything
- Jimmy Rankin, Forget About the World

==== Electronic Album of the Year ====
- Tim Hecker, Ravedeath, 1972
- Austra, Feel It Break
- Azari & III, Azari & III
- Junior Boys, It's All True
- Arthur Oskan, A Little More Than Everything

==== Francophone Album of the Year ====
- Malajube, La caverne
- Cœur de pirate, Blonde
- Catherine Major, Le Désert des solitudes
- Jérôme Minière, Le vrai le faux
- Fred Pellerin, C'est un monde

==== Instrumental Album of the Year ====
- Stretch Orchestra, Stretch Orchestra
- Andrew Collins, Cats & Dogs
- MAZ, Téléscope
- L'Orkestre des Pas Perdus, L'Âge du cuivre
- Colin Stetson, New History Warfare Vol. 2: Judges

==== International Album of the Year ====
- Adele, 21
- Coldplay, Mylo Xyloto
- Lady Gaga, Born This Way
- LMFAO, Sorry for Party Rocking
- Rihanna, Loud

==== Contemporary Jazz Album of the Year ====
- Phil Dwyer Orchestra feat. Mark Fewer, Changing Seasons
- Hilario Durán and Jane Bunnett, Cuban Rhapsody
- François Bourassa Quartet, Idiosyncrasie
- Colin Stetson, New History Warfare Vol. 2: Judges
- Chris Tarry, Rest of the Story

==== Traditional Jazz Album of the Year ====
- David Braid, Verge
- Dave Young Quintet, Aspects of Oscar
- Oliver Jones, Live in Baden
- Kirk MacDonald Orchestra, Deep Shadows
- Mike Murley Septet, Still Rollin'

==== Vocal Jazz Album of the Year ====
- Sonia Johnson, Le Carré de nos amours
- Fern Lindzon, Two Kites
- Sophie Milman, In the Moonlight
- The Nylons, Skin Tight
- Diana Panton, To Brazil with Love

==== Metal/Hard Music Album of the Year ====
- KEN mode, Venerable
- Anvil, Juggernaut of Justice
- Cauldron, Burning Fortune
- Fuck the Facts, Die Miserable
- Devin Townsend, Deconstruction

==== Pop Album of the Year ====
- Hedley, Storms
- Down with Webster, Time to Win, Vol. 2
- Avril Lavigne, Goodbye Lullaby
- Lights, Siberia
- Marianas Trench, Ever After

==== Rap Recording of the Year ====
- Drake, Take Care
- Classified, Handshakes and Middle Fingers
- D-Sisive, Jonestown 2: Jimmy Go Bye-Bye
- Kardinal Offishall, Anywhere (Ol' Time Killin' Pt. 2)
- Swollen Members, Dagger Mouth

==== Rock Album of the Year ====
- The Sheepdogs, Learn & Burn
- Arkells, Michigan Left
- Matthew Good, Lights of Endangered Species
- Sam Roberts, Collider
- Sloan, The Double Cross

==== Roots and Traditional Album of the Year (solo) ====
- Bruce Cockburn, Small Source of Comfort
- Craig Cardiff, Floods & Fires
- David Francey, Late Edition
- Dave Gunning, A Tribute to John Allan Cameron
- Lindi Ortega, Little Red Boots

==== Roots and Traditional Album of the Year (group) ====
- The Wailin' Jennys, Bright Morning Stars
- The Deep Dark Woods, The Place I Left Behind
- The Good Lovelies, Let the Rain Fall
- The Once, Row Upon Row of the People They Know
- Twilight Hotel, When the Wolves Go Blind

==== World Music Album of the Year ====
- Kiran Ahluwalia, Aam Zameen: Common Ground
- Azam Ali, From Night to the Edge of Day
- Aboulaye Kone and Bolo Kan, Afo Gné
- Aline Morales, Flores, Tambores e Amores
- Socalled, Sleepover

=== Songs ===
==== Single of the Year ====
- The Sheepdogs, "I Don't Know"
- City and Colour, "Fragile Bird"
- Hedley, "Invincible"
- Nickelback, "When We Stand Together"
- Johnny Reid, "Let's Go Higher"

==== Classical Composition of the Year ====
- Derek Charke, "Sepia Fragments"
- Jacques Hétu, "String Quartet No. 2"
- Jeffrey Ryan, "Fugitive Colours"
- Heather Schmidt, "Piano Concerto No. 2"
- Ann Southam, "Glass Houses #5"

==== Dance Recording of the Year ====
- Martin Solveig and Dragonette, "Hello"
- Anjulie, "Brand New Chick"
- Deadmau5, "Aural Psynapse"
- Duck Sauce, "Barbra Streisand"
- Mia Martina, Devotion

==== R&B/Soul Recording of the Year ====
- Melanie Fiona, "Gone and Never Coming Back"
- Jully Black, "Set it Off (feat. Kardinal Offishall)"
- JRDN, IAMJRDN
- Robin Thicke, "Pretty Lil' Heart (feat. Lil Wayne)"
- Karl Wolf, "Ghetto Love (feat. Kardinal Offishall)"

==== Reggae Recording of the Year ====
- Exco Levi, "Bleaching Shop"
- Jay Douglas, "Lover's Paradise"
- Dubmatix, "Seeds of Love & Life"
- Tanya Mullings, "Rescue Me"
- Steele, "Woman"

=== Other ===
==== Music DVD of the Year ====
- Feist: Look at What the Light Did Now (Anthony Seck, Janine McInnes and Chip Sutherland)
- David Francey: Burning Bright (Tony Girardin)
- Peter Katz: Live at the Music Gallery (Tim Martin, Framebender and Peter Katz)
- Rush: Time Machine 2011: Live in Cleveland (Scot McFadyen, Sam Dunn and Peggi Cecconi)
- Tegan and Sara: Get Along (Elinor Svoboda-Salazar, Tegan Quin, Sara Quin, Piers Henwood and Nick Blasko)

==== Recording Package of the Year ====
Winner: Jeff Harrison (Designer) and Kim Ridgewell (Illustrator) for Rest of the Story (Chris Tarry)

- Feist, Metals (Janine McInnes, Robyn Kotyk, Graydon Sheppard, Sammy Rawal, Petra Cuschieri and Heather Goodchild)
- Laura Repo, Get Yourself Home (Kirsten Gauthier, Anthony Swaneveld, Steve Dunk and Janet Kimber)
- Dinah Thorpe, 12 (Jayme Spinks and Dinah Thorpe)
- Timber Timbre, Creep on Creepin' On (Taylor Kirk, Robyn Kotyk and Nina Nielsen)

==== Video of the Year ====
- Mike Roberts ("Rumbleseat", The Sadies)
- Jon Busby ("Rows of Houses", Dan Mangan)
- José Lourenço ("Stamp", The Rural Alberta Advantage)
- Michael Maxxis ("Good Day at the Races", Hollerado)
- John JP Poliquin ("The Stand", Mother Mother)

== Compilation album ==
Juno Awards 2012

Compilation album by various artists
- Released: 13 March 2012
- Label: Universal Music Canada

Universal Music Canada released a compilation album of songs from the year's Juno nominees on 13 March 2012. It debuted on the Canadian Albums Chart at number 32.

No.	Title	Artist	Length
1.	"When We Stand Together"	Nickelback
2.	"What The Hell"	Avril Lavigne
3.	"Hold On"	Michael Bublé
4.	"Invincible"	Hedley
5.	"Pray"	Justin Bieber
6.	"Headlines"	Drake
7.	"Sofi Needs a Ladder"	Deadmau5
8.	"Toes"	Lights
9.	"She's Dope"	Down With Webster
10.	"Haven't Had Enough"	Marianas Trench
11.	"Alone Again"	Alyssa Reid (with P. Reign)
12.	"Let’s Go Higher"	Johnny Reid
13.	"I Don't Know"	The Sheepdogs
14.	"Unkind"	Sloan
15.	"Whistleblower"	Arkells
16.	"Zero Orchestra"	Matthew Good
17.	"I Feel You"	Sam Roberts Band
18.	"Fragile Bird"	City and Colour
19.	"Row of Houses"	Dan Mangan
20.	"How Come You Never Go There"	Feist
