= Future Nostalgia (disambiguation) =

Future Nostalgia is a 2020 album by Dua Lipa.

Future Nostalgia may also refer to:

- "Future Nostalgia" (song), the title track from the Dua Lipa album
- Future Nostalgia Tour, a concert tour in support of the Dua Lipa album
- Club Future Nostalgia, the accompanying remix album of the Dua Lipa album
- Future Nostalgia (The Sheepdogs album), a 2015 album by The Sheepdogs
