= Bros (Canadian band) =

Canadian rock band

- Origin: Toronto, Ontario, Canada
- Genres: rock, soul, pop, exotica
- Years active: 2014–present
- Label: Dine Alone Records
- Members: Ewan Currie; Shamus Currie
- Website: brosmakingmusic.com

Bros (stylized as BROS) is a rock duo from Saskatoon, Saskatchewan featuring brothers Ewan and Shamus Currie of The Sheepdogs. Bros was formed in 2014 and released their debut album in 2016, entitled Vol. 1. They have been praised for a "funky, sultry sound" that represents a departure from the southern-rock and classic-rock orientation of The Sheepdogs.

== Career ==
Ewan Currie has been the front man and primary songwriter for the Canadian rock band The Sheepdogs since their inception, in Saskatoon, Saskatchewan, in 2004. His brother Shamus joined the band as a touring member in 2012, and became a full member of the band as they were recording their fifth album, Future Nostalgia, in 2014.

Following that session, in the winter of 2014, the two brothers moved from Saskatoon to Toronto. They began to write songs together for the first time, with the intention of branching out into a variety of musical styles based on their personal interests, ranging from old-school funk and power pop to the psychedelic Latin sounds of Os Mutantes.

The pair recorded the album that became Vol.1 with Thomas D'Arcy co-producing, along with the two Curries, at his Taurus Recording studio. The album has accumulated more than one million streams. One critic identified Bros as having "a much funkier, less guitar-oriented sound than the Sheepdogs." He notes too that Sheepdogs fans might be surprised to learn that Ewan Currie likes "Elton John, Burt Bacharach, and Henry Mancini."

The band's debut single "Tell Me" became the theme song for the CBC Radio program Q with Tom Power when Power began hosting in August 2016.

A year after the debut, Bros released a two-sided single for the holidays, entitled A Very Bros. Christmas, Vol. 1, featuring two original songs.

Their second full length album, Vol. 2, was released on July 16, 2021. The sophomore effort expanded on the variety of their debut record with sounds ranging "wildly from psychedelic jazz instrumentals to 60s influenced pop and soul."

== Members ==
- Ewan Currie – vocals, guitar, bass, clarinet
- Shamus Currie – keyboards, trombone, vocals

== Discography ==
=== Albums ===
- Vol. 1 (2016)
- Vol. 2 (2021)

=== 7-inch releases ===
- A Very BROS Christmas, Vol. 1 (featuring "It's Christmas Day" and "These Things Comfort Me")

=== Singles ===
Title	Year	Chart peak		Album
Title	Year	CAN Rock	CAN Alternative	Album
"Tell Me"	2016	28	17	Vol. 1
"Couldn't Hear A Thing"	2017	—	—	Vol. 1
"It's Christmas Day"	2017	—	—	A Very BROS Christmas, Vol. 1
"Never Gonna Stop"	2021	—	—	Vol. 2

=== Music videos ===
Year	Video	Director
2016	"Tell Me"	Ryan Gullen
2017	"Couldn't Hear A Thing"	Adrian Vieni
2017	"It's Christmas Day	Andrei Feheregyhazi
2021	"Never Gonna Stop"	Justin Broadbent & Josh Rankin
2021	"Garbanzo Man"	Mat Dunlap/Amanda Burt/Bros
