= The Sheepdogs (album) =

Studio album by The Sheepdogs
- Released: September 4, 2012
- Recorded: January – March 2012
- Genres: Southern rock, boogie rock, rock, blues rock
- Length: 44:13
- Label: Atlantic
- Producers: Patrick Carney, Austin Scaggs

The Sheepdogs chronology
Five Easy Pieces (2011)	The Sheepdogs (2012)	Future Nostalgia (2015)

Singles from The Sheepdogs
- 1. "The Way It Is" Released: 2012; 2. "Feeling Good" Released: 2012; 3. "How Late, How Long" Released: 2013

Professional ratings
Review scores
Source	Rating
AllMusic	4/5 stars

The Sheepdogs is the fourth studio album and major label debut by Canadian rock band The Sheepdogs. The album was released on September 4, 2012. The album debuted at #1 in Canada. The album was certified Gold in Canada on March 6, 2013. The album was nominated for Rock Album of the Year at the 2013 Juno Awards.

== Production ==
The album was produced by Patrick Carney, the drummer for the blues rock band The Black Keys, and Rolling Stone editor Austin Scaggs.

The album was mixed by Tchad Blake.

== In popular culture ==
The song "Feeling Good" is featured on NASCAR The Game: Inside Line and NHL 17. The National Hockey League's Toronto Maple Leafs also used the song as their goal song during the 2015–16 season, and the Toronto Blue Jays likewise used "Feeling Good" as their victory song in 2015. The Canada men's national ice hockey team used "Feeling Good" as their goal song at the 2025 4 Nations Face-Off and the 2026 Winter Olympics.

== Track listing ==
All song written by Ewan Currie.

No.	Title	Length
1.	"Laid Back"	3:30
2.	"Feeling Good"	3:10
3.	"Alright OK"	4:15
4.	"Never Gonna Get My Love"	3:16
5.	"Ewan's Blues"	2:44
6.	"The Way It Is"	2:33
7.	"Javelina!"	2:38
8.	"I Need Help"	2:34
9.	"Is Your Dream Worth Dying For?"	2:57
10.	"How Late, How Long"	3:09
11.	"Sharp Sounds"	2:54
12.	"In My Mind"	4:07
13.	"While We're Young"	2:45
14.	"It Ain't Easy to Go"	3:41

== Certifications ==
Region	Certification	Certified units/sales
Canada (Music Canada)	Platinum	80,000^{‡}
^{‡} Sales+streaming figures based on certification alone.
