= Kurt Streit =

Austrian-American tenor (born 1959)

Kurt Streit (born 14 October 1959 in Itazuke, Fukuoka, Japan) is an Austrian-American tenor who performs in operas.

== Education ==
Kurt Streit studied at the University of New Mexico with Marilyn Tyler. Before transferring to and studying at University of New Mexico, Streit studied at Rockmont College in Lakewood, Colorado, where he performed in various productions including Shakespeare’s Taming of the Shrew.

== Career ==
Streit started his career at American opera houses such as San Francisco, Santa Fe, Dallas, the Texas Opera Theater and the Milwaukee Skylight Comic Opera. His European career started with the Hamburg Staatsoper, where he sang in operas by Mozart, Donizetti, and Rossini. He appeared at music festivals in Schwetzingen, Aix-en-Provence, Salzburg and Glyndebourne. Streit performed at most international opera houses, including The Vienna State Opera, Theater an der Wien, The Metropolitan Opera New York, The Royal Opera House, Covent Garden in London, La Scala in Milan, both the Bastille and the Grand Opera in Paris, Teatro Real the Zarzuela in Madrid, and the Gran Teatre del Liceu in Barcelona, Munich, Brussels, Leipzig, Düsseldorf, San Francisco. He was nominated for a Grammy award for his recording of Brahms' Liebeslieder-Walzer. Streit is considered a Mozart specialist and has performed in 23 productions of Mozart's Zauberflöte and 7 productions of Mozart's Idomeneo, among many international appearances in Mozart operas. His repertoire includes Händel, Monteverdi and Beethoven and 19th and 20th century composers such as Wagner, Johann Strauss, Berlioz and Janáček.

== Personal life ==
Kurt Streit was born in Japan as the son of US citizens. In 2005 he became a citizen of Austria, where he lived with his son in Styria. He is married to the Canadian operatic soprano Jane Archibald, with whom he has two children.

== Discography ==
- Das Rheingold, Wagner, Oehms OC935 (Weigle; Dicke, Arwady; Stensvold, Schmeckenbecher; Frankfurt Museumsorchester)
- Die Zauberflöte, Mozart, Decca 470 056-2 (Östman; Bonney, Jo, Cachemaille, Hagegard, Sigmundsson, Watson, Drottningholm Court Theatre Orchestra; Also released on L'Oiseau-Lyre 440 085-2)
- Così fan tutte, Mozart, Erato 2292-45475-2 (Cuberli, Bartoli, Rodgers, Furlanetto, Tomlinson, Berlin Phil., Barenboim)
- Così fan tutte, Mozart, EMI 5 56170 2 (Sir Simon Rattle; Finley, Allen, Martinpelto, Hagley, Murray)
- Requiem, Mozart, BMG Classics (Nikolaus Harnoncourt; Christine Schafer; Bernarda Fink; Gerald Finley; Concentus Musicus Wien; Arnold Schoenberg Choir; released on Deutsche Harmonia Mundi, 82876 58705 2)*
- Die Entführung aus dem Serail, Mozart, Sony S2K 48053 (Bruno Weil; Studer, Szmytka, Gambill)
- 9. Symphonie, Beethoven, EMI (Sir Simon Rattle; Vienna Philharmonic; Barbara Bonney; Thomas Hampson; Birgit Remmert)
- Messe in D minor, Cherubini, EMI 7243 5 57166 2 (Riccardo Muti; Tilling, Fulgoni, Tomasson)
- Das Buch mit Sieben Siegeln, Schmidt, Teldec -8573-81040 (Harnoncourt; Vienna Philharmonic; Roeschmann, Hawlata, Lipovsek, Lippert)
- Liebesliederwalzer, Brahms, EMI 5 55430 2 (Bonney, Bär, von Otter, Deutsch)
- Partenope, Handel, Chandos CHAN0717 (Christian Curnyn; Lawrence Zazzo, Stephen Wallace, Rosemary Joshua; Early Opera Company)
- The Yeoman of the Guard, Gilbert & Sullivan, Philips 438-138-2 (Neville Mariner, Terfel, Allen)
- Othmar Schoeck Lieder, Schoeck, Jecklin JD 679-2 (Rieger)
- Paul Bunyan, Britten, Chandos Chan9781 (Live Recording Covent Garden, Hickox)
- Echo et Narcisse, Gluck, Harmonica Mundi 405210/2 (Rene Jacobs)
- Der Stein der Weisen, Mozart, et al., TelArc 80508-2CD (Boston Baroque/ Pearlman)
- DVD Idomeneo, Mozart, Dynamic DV33463
- DVD Rodelinda, Handel, Warner Music Vision -3984-23024-2, (William Christie; Anna Caterina Antonacci, Andreas Scholl)
