= Jackson Square (album) =

Studio album by Arkells
- Released: October 28, 2008
- Recorded: 2008
- Studio: Metalworks Studios, Mississauga, Ontario
- Genre: Soul, rock
- Length: 42:42
- Label: Dine Alone Records
- Producer: Jon Drew, Arkells

Arkells chronology
Deadlines (2008)	Jackson Square (2008)	Michigan Left (2011)

Singles from Jackson Square
- 1. "Oh, the Boss Is Coming!" Released: 21 October 2008; 2. "The Ballad of Hugo Chavez" Released: 27 April 2009; 3. "Pullin' Punches" Released: October 2009; 4. "John Lennon" Released: March 2010

Professional ratings
Review scores
Source	Rating
ChartAttack	4/5 stars

Jackson Square is the first full-length album by Arkells. It is their first non-digital release with Dine Alone Records. The album contains updated versions of the 5 songs found on the Deadlines EP along with 7 additional songs. The album is named after Lloyd D. Jackson Square, a shopping mall in the band's hometown of Hamilton, Ontario. The first single, "Oh, the Boss Is Coming!" was released on October 21, 2008. Lead singer Max Kerman describes Jackson Square as "Road-tested, energetic and soulful." On February 24, 2009, the band set up a webpage for fans to vote for the second single between "Pullin' Punches", "John Lennon" and "The Ballad of Hugo Chavez". Ultimately, "The Ballad of Hugo Chavez" was chosen and released to radio as a single on April 27, 2009.

== Track listing ==
All songs written by Arkells.

No.	Title	Length
1.	"Deadlines"	2:45
2.	"Pullin' Punches"	3:18
3.	"Oh, the Boss Is Coming!"	3:41
4.	"The Ballad of Hugo Chavez"	3:01
5.	"Tragic Flaw"	3:54
6.	"No Champagne Socialist"	3:44
7.	"Abigail"	4:17
8.	"Heart of the City"	3:59
9.	"I'm Not the Sun"	3:41
10.	"The Choir"	3:19
11.	"John Lennon"	4:04
12.	"Blueprint"	3:08

== Personnel ==
Arkells

- Mike DeAngelis – guitar
- Nick Dika – bass
- Dan Griffin – keys, guitar, vocals, percussion, harmonica
- Max Kerman – vocals, guitar
- Tim Oxford – drums, percussion

Additional personnel

- Jon Drew – production, mixing
- Arkells – production
- Chris Gale – tenor sax, baritone sax
- Wayne Cochrane, Jamie Krebs, Luke Marshall – assistant engineering
- Noah Mintz/The Lacquer Channel – mastering
