= Rally Cry (album) =

Studio album by Arkells
- Released: October 19, 2018
- Studios: Noble Street Studios (Toronto, Ontario)
- Length: 36:16
- Label: Last Gang Records
- Producer: Eric Ratz

Arkells chronology
Morning Report (2016)	Rally Cry (2018)

Rally Cry is the fifth full-length studio album by Canadian rock band Arkells, released October 19, 2018 on Last Gang Records.

The album was preceded by the politically themed single "People's Champ", and "Relentless" was the second single.

== Promotion ==
The album's concert tour included the band's first major headlining stadium shows, including a kickoff show at Tim Hortons Field in their hometown of Hamilton on June 23, 2018, and a show at the Scotiabank Arena in Toronto on February 16, 2019.

== Critical response ==
Cam Lindsay of Exclaim! rated the album 8 out of 10, writing that "What makes Rally Cry a success, though, is in how Arkells seem to really be going for the big score with creative risks. "Relentless" is built around a sample lifted from Soweto artist Chicco's "Sixolele Babe," whose Afro-pop groove shouldn't really work, but somehow fits into its loud rock framework. "Company Man" is the closest they've come to a Motown or Daptone track of their own, and while it isn't exactly the Dap-Kings, what is?" For Now, Richard Trapunski wrote that "Rally Cry teems with the kind of call-and-response hooks (complete with “whoa-oh” backups), fist-raising slow-build crescendos and precise grooves meant to be screamed to with crowds of people. That kind of gaudy, unself-conscious, 80s-style pop ambition can be a turnoff in many bands, especially in 2018 (see: U2, the Killers, Coldplay), but Arkells do it in a way that makes you root for them like a hometown hockey team."

== Awards ==
At the Juno Awards of 2019, the album won the Juno Award for Rock Album of the Year, and Eric Ratz won the Jack Richardson Producer of the Year Award. Earlier in the evening, however, Jeremy Dutcher had been played off the stage before he was able to finish his acceptance speech for the Juno Award for Indigenous Music Album of the Year, and Arkells brought him up to the stage with them and ceded their speaking time to him so he could finish.

== Track listing ==
All songs written by Arkells.

No.	Title	Length
1.	"Hand Me Downs"	4:15
2.	"American Screams"	3:00
3.	"Relentless"	3:23
4.	"Only for a Moment"	3:46
5.	"Show Me Don't Tell me"	4:02
6.	"People's Champ"	3:06
7.	"Eyes on the Prize"	4:05
8.	"Saturday Night"	3:19
9.	"Company Man"	3:27
10.	"Don't Be a Stranger"	3:52
