= Changing Colours =

Studio album by The Sheepdogs
- Released: February 2, 2018
- Studio: Taurus Recording
- Genre: Rock
- Length: 49:27
- Label: Warner Music Canada
- Producer: Thomas D'Arcy and Ewan Currie

The Sheepdogs chronology
Future Nostalgia (2015)	Changing Colours (2018)

Singles from Changing Colours
- 1. "I've Got a Hole Where My Heart Should Be" Released: October 13, 2017; 2. "Nobody" Released: March 8, 2018; 3. "Saturday Night" Released: January 18, 2019

Changing Colours is the sixth studio album by Canadian rock band The Sheepdogs. The album was released on February 2, 2018. The following year, Changing Colours was nominated for the Juno Award for Rock Album of the Year at the 2019 Juno Awards. The cover was inspired by The Har-You Percussion Group's self-titled 1968 album.

== Track listing ==
No.	Title	Length
1.	"Nobody"	4:30
2.	"I've Got A Hole Where My Heart Should Be"	3:15
3.	"Saturday Night"	2:55
4.	"Let It Roll"	3:42
5.	"The Big Nowhere"	3:41
6.	"I Ain't Cool"	3:27
7.	"You Got To Be A Man"	2:17
8.	"Cool Down"	2:37
9.	"Kiss The Brass ring"	1:51
10.	"Cherries Jubilee"	2:17
11.	"I'm Just Waiting for my Time"	4:20
12.	"Medley: I) Born A Restless Man"	1:39
13.	"Medley: II) The Bailieboro Turnaround"	1:31
14.	"Medley: III) Up In Canada"	3:47
15.	"Medley: IV) H.M.S. Buffalo"	1:00
16.	"Medley: V) Esprit Des Corps"	2:34
17.	"Medley: VI) Run Baby Run"	4:24

Professional ratings
Review scores
Source	Rating
AllMusic	3.5/5 stars

== Personnel ==
The Sheepdogs

- Ewan Currie – lead vocals, guitars, clarinet, Drums, Ukulele, piano, Synthesizer, Tambourine, Organ
- Ryan Gullen – bass, backing vocals, Vibes
- Sam Corbett – drums, Glockenspiel, Gong, Mandolin, Percussion, backing vocals
- Shamus Currie – Organ, piano, Mellotron, trombone, backing vocals, guitar, percussion
- Jimmy Bowskill – Banjo, Guitar, Mandolin, Pedal Steel Guitar, Viola, Violin, backing vocals

Additional musicians

- Adam Hindle – Congas, Drums, Percussion, Triangle, Whistle

== Charts ==
Chart (2018)	Peak position
Canadian Albums (Billboard)	5
