= Malhavoc =

Canadian metal band

- Origin: Toronto, Ontario, Canada
- Genres: Industrial metal; industrial rock; thrash metal (early)
- Years active: 1983–present
- Labels: Epidemic; Cargo
- Members: James Cavalluzzo; Bryan Somerville; Tim Hagberg
- Past members: Justin Pearen; Dave C. Bass; Justin Small; Steve Jelliman; John Carss; Steve Crowhurst; Chris Scahill; Lee McCormack; Dave Kiner; Rob Wright; Nigel Williams; Jeremy Inkel; Ric H.
- Website: malhavoc.com

Malhavoc is a Canadian industrial metal band, formed in 1983 in Toronto, Ontario. The band's only constant member is singer and multi-instrumentalist James Cavalluzzo.

Starting out as an extreme metal act, the band soon employed elements from industrial music, becoming one of the earlier acts of industrial metal genre. The band is also known for its stage antics, which incorporated sadomasochism, nudity, role-playing violence and self-harm.

== History ==
Malhavoc was formed in 1983 by James Cavalluzzo. The band has recorded multiple demos during the '80s, The Destruction Starts (1983), The Destruction Continues (1984), Age of the Dark Renaissance (1986) and Shrine (1988), last of which introduced industrial, death metal and ambient elements to the band's sound. The band's debut album, The Release, was issued in 1990; its line-up included guitarists Dave Kiner and Rob Wright, and bassist Steve Jelliman alongside Cavalluzzo.

1991's Punishments EP saw the inclusion of programmer Steve Crowhurst, as well as contributions from Dave Ogilvie of Skinny Puppy. The band's second album, Premeditated Murder, was released in the following year; featuring elements from electronic music and thrash metal, the record met with a sampling controversy after the band sampled "Sympathy for the Devil" by The Rolling Stone without clearance. Its follow-up, Get Down (1994), saw the introduction of live drummer John Carss; the record strayed away from the band's heavy metal roots while featuring heavier elements from techno, ambient and industrial. The record was nominated for a Juno Award for Best Hard Rock Album in 1995.

Increasing disagreements during the release of Get Down led to line-up changes within the band. The band's forthcoming release, Lazarus Complex: A Tale of Two Zombies, was subsequently delayed as a result of the complications between the band and the record label; it was eventually issued in 2000. It was produced by Dave Ogilvie. Following its release, Cavalluzzo sporadically resurrected Malhavoc as a personal project. In 2004, Malhavoc released a cover EP, Human Fly. In 2007, Cavalluzzo assembled a live band for touring.

== Band members ==
Current

- James Cavalluzzo (Jimi LaMort) — vocals, guitar, bass, programming
- Bryan Somerville — guitar
- Tim Hagberg — drums

Former

- Justin Pearen — bass
- Dave C. Bass — bass
- Justin Small — bass
- Steve Jelliman — bass, guitar, programming
- John Carss — drums
- Steve Crowhurst — drums, keyboards, programming
- Chris Scahill — guitar
- Dave Kiner — guitar
- Lee McCormack — guitar
- Rob Wright — guitar
- Nigel Williams— guitar
- Jeremy Inkel — keyboards
- Ric H. — vocals

== Discography ==
Studio albums

- The Release (1990)
- Premeditated Murder (1992)
- Get Down (1994)
- The Lazarus Complex: A Tale of Two Zombies (2000)

EPs

- Punishments (1991)
- Human Fly (2004)
