= Crown Lands (band) =

Canadian rock music duo

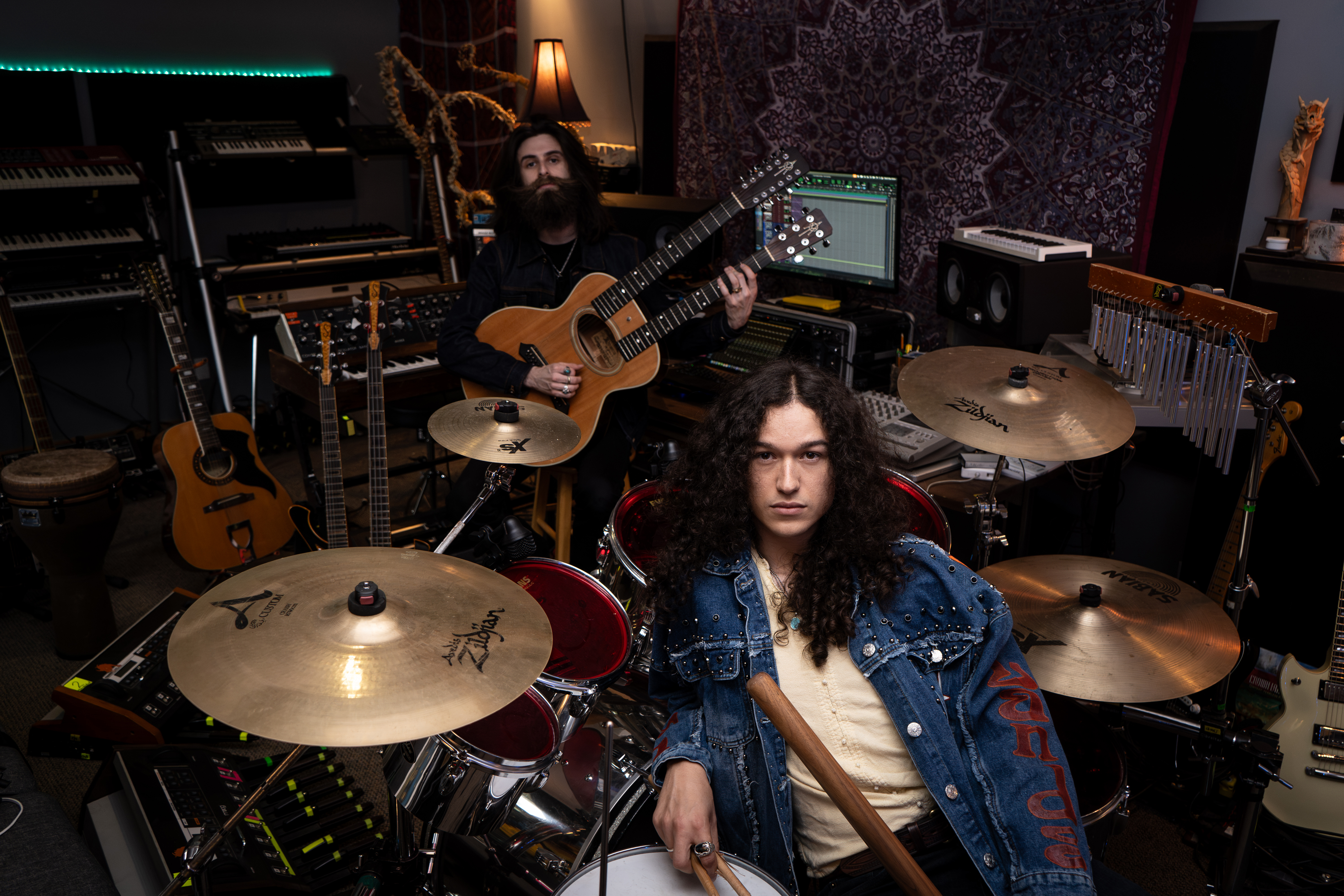
- Crown Lands in 2025. From back to front: Comeau and Bowles.

Background information
- Origin: Oshawa, Ontario, Canada
- Genres: Progressive rock; hard rock; blues rock
- Years active: 2015–present
- Labels: Universal; Spinefarm
- Members: Cody Bowles; Kevin Comeau
- Website: www.crownlandsmusic.com

Crown Lands is a Canadian rock music duo from Oshawa, Ontario. The band consists of vocalist/drummer Cody Bowles, and guitarist/bassist/keyboardist Kevin Comeau. With prog-rock influences, the duo compose music and lyrics inspired by Indigenous resistance to colonialism. They have stated that their name, "Crown Lands", communicates a desire to disrupt the concept of Canadian "crown land", or government-held lands stolen from First Nations.

Crown Lands won the Juno Award for Breakthrough Group of the Year at the Juno Awards of 2021. The band were also nominated for Rock Album of the Year. Their sophomore album Fearless was nominated for Rock Album of the Year at the 2024 Juno Awards. Their album Ritual II was nominated for Instrumental Album of the Year at the 2026 Juno Awards.

== History ==
The band was formed in 2015 when Comeau and Bowles began jamming in a friend's barn. Comeau studied classical music at Western University in London, Ontario, and Bowles studied psychology and music at York University in Toronto. Their first EP, Mantra, was released on August 18, 2016. They released their second EP Rise Over Run on September 8, 2017. It includes the band's single "Mountain", about colonialism and the history of residential schools in Canada. In 2018, the band opened for Jack White on the Canadian leg of his tour. On June 11, 2020, they released the acoustic EP Wayward Flyers, Vol. 1 on Universal, featuring a cover of Neil Young's "Birds".

Their full-length self-titled debut album was released on August 13, 2020, and was produced in Nashville by Dave Cobb. The album was preceded by the single "End of the Road", a protest song about the issue of missing and murdered Indigenous women whose video features narration by Tanya Tagaq.

Their March 2021 single "Context: Fearless Pt. 1" is a tribute to the band Rush, a 10-part song with sections referencing Rush's work. They made a demo of the song with Terry Brown, producer of Rush's first nine albums, and later worked on the track with Nick Raskulinecz, co-producer of two Rush albums, and Rush producer David Bottrill.

In July 2021, the band released the single "White Buffalo", along with "The Oracle", both produced by David Bottrill. Both songs were included on the band's four-track EP White Buffalo, released on September 16, 2021, on Spinefarm Records / Universal Music Canada. The band describes "White Buffalo" as the third in a trilogy of songs about Indigenous resistance, including "Mountain" and "End of the Road".

In October and November 2022, the band opened for Greta Van Fleet on their U.S. Tour. On February 24, 2023 they released the single "Lady of the Lake". That song and the following single "Starlifter: Fearless Pt. II" were included on the band's second album, Fearless, released on March 31, 2023 and produced by David Bottrill. The band toured across Canada in support of Fearless in the spring of 2023 alongside July Talk. In the fall of 2023, Crown Lands toured with Kiss on their final tour.

In December 2023 Bowles, who had been raised by a father who identified as Mi'kmaq, released a public statement revealing that genealogical research had found that they were not indigenous at all, but in fact was of Black Nova Scotian descent. They apologized for any harm caused to indigenous communities by their erroneous beliefs about their heritage.

In June 2025, the band signed with Inside Out Music and released the two-part RITUAL: Ritual I on July 8, 2025, and Ritual II on August 1, 2025. The latter was nominated for the Instrumental Album of the Year at the 2026 Juno Awards.

The band announced their 4th Full Length Studio LP Apocalypse on February 6, 2026 by releasing the 19-minute title-track as the lead single. The album is due to come out on May 15, 2026. In March 2026 the band will embark on a headline tour across Ontario, Canada to promote their upcoming album.

== Reception ==
James LaBrie, vocalist of the progressive metal band Dream Theater, named Crown Lands as his "Best New Band of 2021" in an interview with Revolver Magazine.

Gene Simmons, bassist of the hard-rock band Kiss (band), praised Crown Lands in a Rolling Stone interview: We have a band that’s opening for us here in Canada. They’re fantastic. Two guys. No tapes. They’re called Crown Lands. You should check them out."

== Members ==
- Cody Bowles (they/them) – lead vocals, drums, percussion, flutes, didgeridoo
- Kevin Comeau (he/him) – guitars, bass, bass pedals, keyboards, backing vocals

== Awards ==
Year	Award	Category	Work	Result
2021	Juno Award	Breakthrough Group of the Year	Crown Lands	Won
2021	Juno Award	Rock Album of the Year	Crown Lands	Nominated
2024	Juno Award	Rock Album of the Year	Fearless	Nominated
2026	Juno Award	Instrumental Album of the Year	Ritual II	TBD

== Discography ==
=== Studio albums ===
List of full-length Studio albums, with selected details
Title	Album details
Crown Lands	Released: August 13, 2020; Label: Universal; Formats: CD, LP record, digital download
Fearless	Released: March 31, 2023; Label: Universal; Formats: CD, LP record, digital download
Ritual I & II	Released: July 8, 2025; Label: InsideOut Music; Formats: LP record, digital download
Apocalypse	Released: May 15, 2026; Label: InsideOut Music; Formats: CD, LP record, digital download

=== Live albums ===
List of full-length live albums, with selected details
Title	Album details
Odyssey Vol. 1	Released: December 2, 2021; Label: Universal; Formats: LP record, digital download

=== EPs ===
List of extended plays, with selected details
Title	Album details
Mantra	Released: August 18, 2016; Label: Self-released; Formats: CD, digital download
Rise Over Run	Released: September 8, 2017; Label: Self-released; Formats: CD, digital download
Wayward Flyers, Vol. 1	Released: June 11, 2020; Label: Universal; Formats: LP, digital download
White Buffalo	Released: September 16, 2021; Label: Spinefarm/Universal; Formats: CD, LP Record, Cassette Tape, Digital download

=== Singles ===
- "Mountain" (2018)
- "Feeling Good" (2020)
- "End of the Road" (2020)
- "Context: Fearless Pt. 1" (2021)
- "White Buffalo" (2021)
- "Come Together" (2022)
- "Lady of the Lake" (2023)
