= Arkells =

Canadian rock band

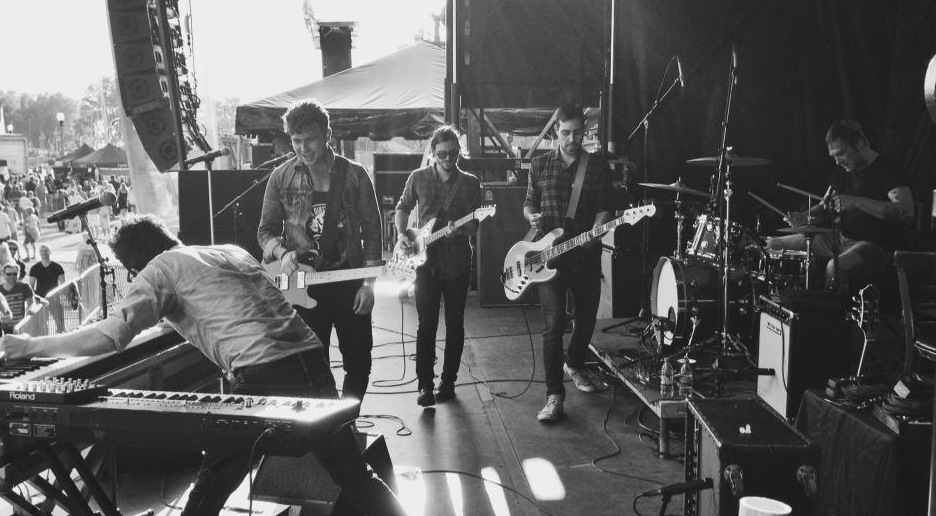
- Arkells performing in Buffalo, New York in 2013

Background information
- Origin: Hamilton, Ontario, Canada
- Genre: Alternative rock
- Years active: 2006–present
- Label: Universal Music Canada
- Members: Max Kerman; Mike DeAngelis; Nick Dika; Tim Oxford; Anthony Carone
- Past members: Dan Griffin
- Website: arkellsmusic.com

Arkells is a Canadian rock band, formed in Hamilton, Ontario. In 2006, they signed with Dine Alone Records, and have since signed with Universal Music Canada. They have released ten albums: Jackson Square (2008), Michigan Left (2011), High Noon (2014), Morning Report (2016), Rally Cry (2018), Blink Once (2021), Blink Twice (2022), Laundry Pile (2023), Disco Loadout, Volume 1 (2024) and Between Us (2026). The band has been nominated for over 15 Juno Awards; winning Rock Album of the Year for High Noon and Rally Cry, and six times for Group of the Year.

== History ==
=== Formation and Jackson Square (2006–2010) ===
During their first few live shows the band called themselves Charlemagne but changed their name when another band of the same name threatened to sue them. The band is named after Arkell Street in the Westdale neighbourhood of Hamilton, near McMaster University, where they lived and would practice their music. All five original band members attended McMaster where lead singer Max Kerman graduated with an honours BA in political science. Kerman met guitarist Mike DeAngelis at a McMaster Welcome Week event where they discovered they had an identical taste in music.

Arkells' debut album Jackson Square was released October 28, 2008, on Dine Alone Records. In late 2008, Arkells toured Canada as opening act for Matt Mays & El Torpedo. Later that year, on November 22, they performed the halftime show at the Vanier Cup in their hometown.

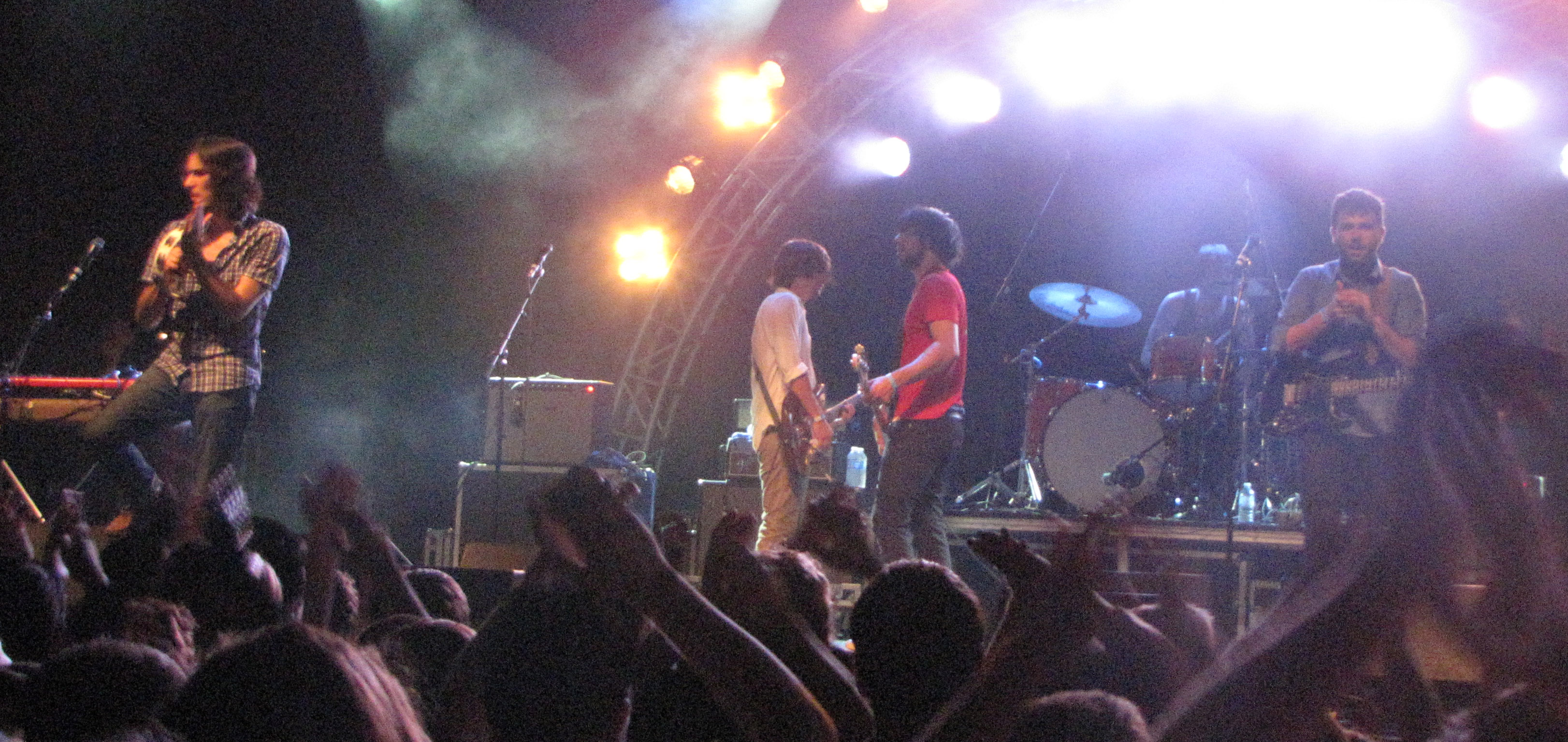
Arkells performing at the Sound of Music Festival in Burlington, Ontario in 2010

In early 2009 they toured with Waking Eyes across Canada. Arkells were featured on Aux.tv's Alt Sessions where they performed their full EP. In October, 2009, Arkells won a favourite new artist CASBY Award (short for Canadian Artists Selected by You) from Toronto radio station 102.1 The Edge at a ceremony and concert at Toronto's Kool Haus. The band also performed at the event. In April 2010, the band won the Juno Award for New Group of the Year, and on May 15, 2010, were picked to open for Them Crooked Vultures at the Air Canada Centre in Toronto.

=== Michigan Left and High Noon (2011–2015) ===
In 2011, the band wrote and recorded their second album Michigan Left, which was released on October 18 of that year. The first single, "Whistleblower", was released on July 5, 2011. The band also released a second song, "Kiss Cam", in July. On October 6, 2011, it was announced that Dan Griffin would be leaving the band to go back to school. He was replaced by Anthony Carone. In 2012, Arkells won the 2012 Juno Award for Group of the Year.

On April 7, 2014, Arkells released the first track, "Never Thought That This Would Happen", from their third album, which was produced by Tony Hoffer (Beck, The Kooks, M83). One month later, on May 13, the band released the album's first single "Come to Light", and confirmed the title of the record would be High Noon. The record was released on Dine Alone/Universal Records, August 5, 2014.

The band toured extensively, including tours in the United States with Lights, Tokyo Police Club, The Postelles, X Ambassadors, and Lydia; European touring with Billy Talent, Augustines, British Sea Power, and Anti-Flag as well as Canadian touring with Metric, the Tragically Hip, Hollerado, and Sam Roberts. At the Juno Awards of 2015, the group won the Juno Award for Group of the Year and the Juno Award for Rock Album of the Year. High Noon was also long listed for the Polaris prize in 2015. On October 23, 2015, the band released a new EP, "Study Music", which they self-produced and released on Universal Music Canada/Dine Alone Records.

=== Morning Report and Rally Cry (2016–2020) ===
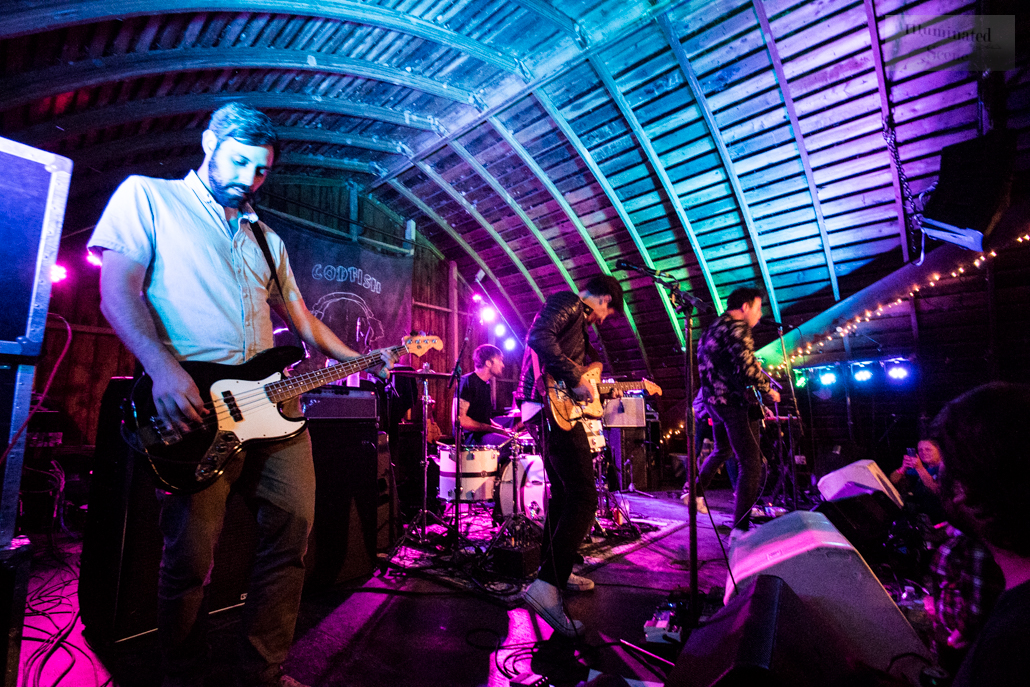
Arkells performing in Maquoketa, Iowa in 2016

Arkells began teasing new material from their forthcoming album on tour in the spring of 2016. The fourth album, Morning Report, was released on August 5, 2016. The first single, "Private School", debuted on May 6, 2016, and charted at number 1 that summer. The video features cameos from Lights, Dave Monks of Tokyo Police Club and Steve Jocz (formerly of Sum 41), who also directed the video.

At the Juno Awards of 2017, Arkells were nominated for Juno Award for Group of the Year and the Juno Award for Rock Album of the Year. They performed their viral hit "Drake's Dad" live on the television broadcast. They released a new single on April 7, 2017, entitled "Knocking at the Door". The track shot to number 1 on the Canadian alt/rock charts, where it spent 14 weeks at #1. It also became their first #1 Active Rock single. They performed the track live that summer on the 2017 NHL Awards in Las Vegas and the 2017 iHeartRadio MuchMusic Video Awards in Toronto. In the summer of 2017, the band toured the festival circuit, playing Coachella Valley Music and Arts Festival, Osheaga Festival, and Sasquatch! Music Festival. Later in the year, the track cracked the US ALT chart, peaking at #39.

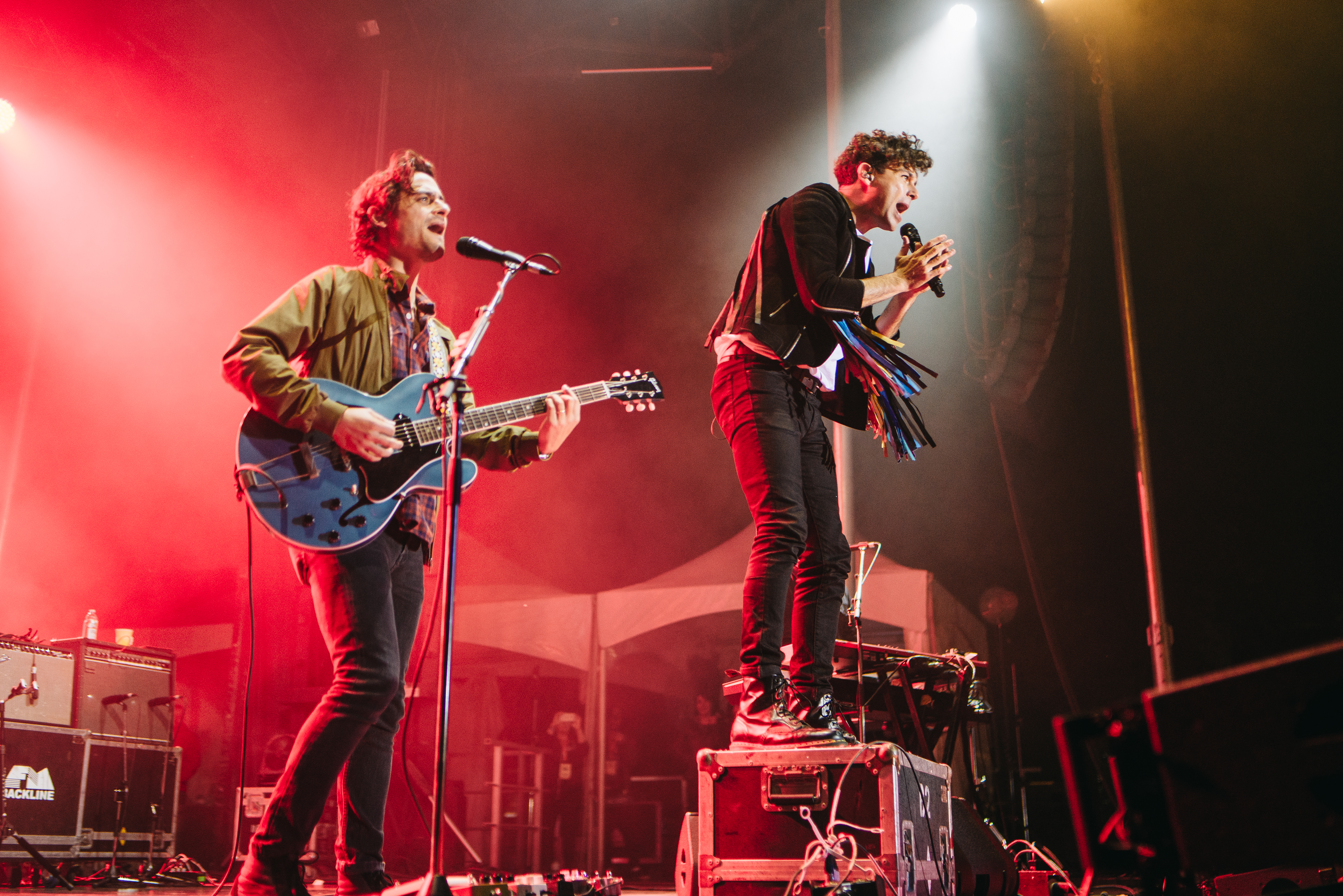
DeAngelis (left) and Kerman (right) performing in Edmonton, Alberta in 2018

In February 2018, the band was invited to South Korea to perform for the Canadian Olympic team during the 2018 Winter Olympics. In June 2018, the band played at Tim Hortons Field in their hometown of Hamilton for a crowd of 24,000 people. It was the largest crowd for an outdoor show in Hamilton since Pink Floyd drew 50,000 to Ivor Wynne Stadium in 1975. On August 15, 2018, the band announced that their fifth studio album, Rally Cry, would be released on October 19, 2018. On June 23, 2018, Arkells hosted a major hometown concert, dubbed "The Rally", at Tim Hortons Field in Hamilton, Ontario. The concert was paired with several events across the city including a market outside the stadium, a bike ride to the show, and featured Ellevator, Bishop Briggs, and Cold War Kids. Arkells released their fifth studio album, Rally Cry, on October 19, 2018, accompanied by a Canadian tour featuring Lord Huron as the opening act. The tour featured the Arkells' largest arena show yet, at the Scotiabank Arena in Toronto on February 16, 2019.

On February 25, 2020, the band released the new single and video "Years in the Making". On July 30, they released the single "Quitting You", and announced the release of Campfire Chords, a full-length album featuring acoustic versions of earlier songs, on August 20. Each member recorded his part at home during the COVID-19 quarantine and sent it to Carone, who then edited, mixed and produced the pieces into complete songs.

=== Blink Once and Blink Twice (2021–2022) ===
On March 25, 2021, the band released the new single and video "You Can Get It", featuring guest vocals by K.Flay. The single was featured in the trailer of the video game Forza Horizon 5, as well as in one of the in-game radio stations. The single “All Roads” was later released. Both of these singles were included on the band's sixth studio album Blink Once, which was released on September 22, 2021. On December 12, 2021, the band performed at the halftime show of the 108th Grey Cup at Tim Horton's Field in Hamilton.

On June 23, 2022, the band announced that their studio album Blink Twice will be released on September 23. The album features collaborations with Cold War Kids, Aly and AJ, Tegan and Sara and Beatrice Martin. After two years of postponements due to the COVID-19 pandemic, the band held the second edition of "The Rally" at Tim Hortons Field in Hamilton, Ontario on June 25, 2022. The show featured similar events to the first event in 2018, with a market, bike ride to the show, as well as the unveiling of a collaboration with several organizations to renovate a local basketball court as an effort to improve sport in the community. The concert was their largest yet with 27,000 fans in attendance and featured openers Haviah Mighty, K.Flay, and Mt. Joy.

=== Laundry Pile (2023–present) ===
On September 21, 2023, the band released their eighth studio album (Campfire Chords excluded) Laundry Pile, featuring pre-released singles "Skin" and "Laundry Pile". The album was written and recorded informally during fall of 2022, without the explicit intention of making an album. The songs take on an acoustic form that stay true to each band member's raw musical identities, often with the first takes recorded making the final cut with little production. To celebrate the release of the record, the band held two free pop-up shows at laundromats in Toronto and Hamilton, where they played individual tracks for small group audiences of fifteen people. The band played the album at their "At Your Service" tour across the United States and Southern Ontario in fall of 2023.

== Song influences ==
Arkells prominently feature political motivations in their music. This includes "Knocking at the Door," which was written about The Women's March on Washington.

The band has also spoken about their diverse musical influences from Top 40 to Motown.

== Band members ==
=== Current ===
- Max Kerman – lead vocals, rhythm guitar, keyboards (2006–present)
- Mike DeAngelis – lead guitar, backing vocals (2006–present)
- Nick Dika – bass, keyboards (2006–present)
- Tim Oxford – drums, percussion (2006–present)
- Anthony Carone – keyboards, rhythm guitar, mandolin, backing vocals (2011–present)

=== Former ===
- Dan Griffin – keyboards, rhythm guitar, backing vocals (2006–2011)

=== Touring ===
- Tom "Tommy Mo" Moffett – trumpet, backing vocals (2016–present)
- Ernesto Barahona – trombone, backing vocals (2016–present)
- Dennis "Dennis P" Passley – tenor saxophone, backing vocals (2016–present)
- Yvonne "Yvo Boom" Moir – baritone saxophone, backing vocals (2016–present)
- Ammoye Evans – backing vocals (2016–present)
- Natasha Henry – backing vocals (2016–present)
- Shezelle Weekes – backing vocals (2016–present)
- Maya Killtron – backing vocals, fiddle (2020–present)

== Discography ==
=== Albums ===
Year	Title	Chart positions	Certifications	Label
Year	Title	CAN	Certifications	Label
2008	Jackson Square	—	MC: Gold	Dine Alone Records
2011	Michigan Left	5	MC: Gold	Universal Music Canada
2014	High Noon	3	MC: Platinum	Universal Music Canada / Dine Alone Records
2016	Morning Report	3	MC: Gold	Universal Music Canada / Last Gang Records
2018	Rally Cry	12	MC: Gold	Universal Music Canada / Last Gang Records
2020	Campfire Chords	35		Universal Music Canada
2021	Blink Once	43		Universal Music Canada
2022	Blink Twice	—		Universal Music Canada/Virgin
2023	Laundry Pile	—		Universal Music Canada
2024	Disco Loadout, Volume I	73		Universal Music Canada
2026	Between Us	—		Universal Music Canada

=== Extended plays ===
Year	Title	Chart positions	Label
Year	Title	CAN	Label
2008	Deadlines (Note: Digital re-issue)	—	Dine Alone Records
2008	Live Session (iTunes Exclusive)	—	Dine Alone Records
2012	iTunes Live from Montreal	—	Universal Music Canada
2015	Study Music (Songs from High Noon)	55	Universal Music Canada
2016	Arkells on Audiotree Live	—	Audiotree Music
2019	Arkells on Audiotree Live (No. 2)	—	Audiotree Music
2021	The Last Christmas (We Ever Spend Apart)	—	Arkells Music Label
2022	Apple Music Home Session: Arkells	—	Arkells Music Label

=== Singles ===
Year	Song	Peak Chart Positions					Certifications	Album
Year	Song	CAN	CAN AC	CAN Alt	CAN CHR	CAN Rock	Certifications	Album
2008	"Oh, the Boss Is Coming!"	—	—	4	—	8		Jackson Square
2009	"Ballad of Hugo Chávez"	—	—	12	—	12		Jackson Square
2009	"Pullin' Punches"	—	—	14	—	32		Jackson Square
2010	"John Lennon"	—	—	42	—	48		Jackson Square
2011	"Whistleblower"	—	—	5	—	4		Michigan Left
2011	"Michigan Left"	—	—	7	—	12		Michigan Left
2012	"On Paper"	—	—	15	—	25		Michigan Left
2012	"Ticats are Hummin'"	—	—	—	—	—		Non-album single
2014	"Come to Light"	81	—	2	—	2	MC: Platinum	High Noon
2014	"Never Thought That This Would Happen"	—	—	—	—	46	MC: Gold	High Noon
2014	"Leather Jacket"	88	—	1	—	2	MC: 2× Platinum	High Noon
2015	"11:11"	—	—	—	—	12	MC: Platinum	High Noon
2016	"Private School"	—	—	1	—	4		Morning Report
2016	"Drake's Dad"	—	—	—	—	—		Morning Report
2016	"My Heart's Always Yours"	—	—	3	—	4	MC: Platinum	Morning Report
2017	"Knocking at the Door"	— (Note: "Knocking at the Door" did not enter the Billboard Canadian Hot 100, but peaked at number 38 on the Canadian Digital Song Sales chart.)	43	1	—	1	MC: 2× Platinum	Morning Report (Deluxe)
2018	"People's Champ"	—	—	2	—	3	MC: Gold	Rally Cry
2018	"Relentless"	— (Note: "Relentless" did not enter the Billboard Canadian Hot 100, but peaked at number 47 on the Canadian All-format Airplay chart.)	38	—	—	1	MC: Platinum	Rally Cry
2018	"Only for a Moment"	—	—	—	—	—		Rally Cry
2019	"Hand Me Downs"	— (Note: "Hand Me Downs" did not enter the Billboard Canadian Hot 100, but peaked at number 35 on the Canadian All-format Airplay chart.)	33	—	34	3	MC: Gold	Rally Cry
2020	"Years in the Making"	—	—	—	—	4	MC: Gold	Blink Once
2020	"Quitting You"	—	—	—	—	8	MC: Gold	Campfire Chords
2021	"You Can Get It" (featuring K.Flay)	—	—	1	—	5	MC: Gold	Blink Once
2021	"All Roads"	—	—	—	—	—		Blink Once
2022	"Arm in Arm"	—	—	6	—	9		Blink Once
2022	"Reckoning"	—	—	15	—	16	MC: Gold	Blink Twice
2022	"Past Life" (featuring Cold War Kids)	—	—	1	—	4		Blink Twice
2022	"Dance With You" (featuring Aly & AJ, Cœur de pirate)	—	—	—	—	—		Blink Twice
2022	"Human Being" (featuring Lights)	—	—	—	—	—		Blink Twice
2022	"Teenage Tears" (featuring Tegan and Sara)	—	—	—	—	—		Blink Twice
2022	"Floating Like"	—	—	19	—	34		Blink Twice
2023	"Laundry Pile"	—	—	—	—	—		Laundry Pile
2023	"Skin"	—	—	9	—	4		Laundry Pile
2024	"Big Feelings"	—	—	—	—	—		Non-album single
2025	"Come On, Teacher"	—	—	—	—	—		Songs from the Gang
2025	"What Good?"	—	—	—	—	—		Between Us
2025	"Money" (featuring Portugal. The Man)	—	—	1	—	—		Between Us
2026	"Ride" (featuring Grouplove)	—	—	—	—	—		Between Us
2026	"What's On Your Mind" (featuring Poolside)	—	—	—	—	—		Between Us
2026	"Next Summer"	—	—	—	—	—		Between Us
"—" denotes a recording that did not chart or was not released in that territory.

== Accolades ==
Award	Year (Note: Indicates the year of ceremony.)	Category	Nominee(s)	Result	Ref.
Allan Slaight Music Impact Honour	2022	—	Arkells	Won	
Indies	2009	Favourite Group/ Duo	Arkells	Nominated	
Indies	2016	Single of the Year	"Leather Jacket"	Nominated	
Indies	2024	Group or Duo of the Year	Arkells	Nominated	
Indies	2024	Fan Choice	Arkells	Nominated	
Juno Awards	2010	New Group of the Year	Arkells	Won	
Juno Awards	2012	Group of the Year	Arkells	Won	
Juno Awards	2012	Rock Album of the Year	Michigan Left	Nominated	
Juno Awards	2013	Songwriter of the Year	Arkells	Nominated	
Juno Awards	2015	Group of the Year	Arkells	Won	
Juno Awards	2015	Rock Album of the Year	High Noon	Won	
Juno Awards	2017	Group of the Year	Arkells	Nominated	
Juno Awards	2017	Rock Album of the Year	Morning Report	Nominated	
Juno Awards	2018	Fan Choice	Arkells	Nominated	
Juno Awards	2018	Single of the Year	"Knocking at the Door"	Nominated	
Juno Awards	2018	Video of the Year	"Knocking at the Door"	Nominated	
Juno Awards	2019	Group of the Year	Arkells	Won	
Juno Awards	2019	Rock Album of the Year	Rally Cry	Won	
Juno Awards	2021	Group of the Year	Arkells	Won	
Juno Awards	2022	Rock Album of the Year	Blink Once	Nominated	
Juno Awards	2022	Group of the Year	Arkells	Won	
Juno Awards	2023	Group of the Year	Arkells	Won	
Juno Awards	2024	Group of the Year	Arkells	Nominated	
MuchMusic Video Awards	2010	VideoFACT Indie Video of the Year	"Pullin' Punches"	Nominated	
MuchMusic Video Awards	2012	MuchLOUD Rock Video of the Year	"Michigan Left"	Nominated	
MuchMusic Video Awards	2015	Best Rock/Alternative Video	"Leather Jacket"	Nominated	
MuchMusic Video Awards	2017	Best Rock/Alternative Video	Knocking at the Door"	Nominated	
MuchMusic Video Awards	2017	Fan Fave Video	Knocking at the Door"	Won	
MuchMusic Video Awards	2018	Best Rock/Alternative Artist or Group	Arkells	Nominated	
SOCAN Awards	2024	SOCAN National Achievement Award	Arkells	Won	
