= Michigan Left (album) =

Studio album by Arkells
- Released: October 18, 2011
- Recorded: February 11–April 15, 2011
- Studios: The Bathouse Studio, Bath, Ontario
- Genre: Rock
- Length: 35:33
- Label: Universal Music Canada
- Producer: Dan Griffin

Arkells chronology
Jackson Square (2008)	Michigan Left (2011)	High Noon (2014)

Singles from Michigan Left
- 1. "Whistleblower" Released: 30 July 2011; 2. "Michigan Left" Released: 2011

Professional ratings
Review scores
Source	Rating
Paste Magazine	7/10 stars
Allmusic	3/5 stars
Toronto Star	2/4 stars

Michigan Left is the second full-length album by Arkells. It was announced on August 15, 2011, that the album would be released on October 18, 2011. The album cover and track list were also debuted on the band's website the same day. "Whistleblower", the first single, was premiered on July 30, 2011, and was released for purchase on iTunes July 5. The video for the song premiered on New.Music.Live. on MuchMusic July 21, 2011.

The album was nominated for Rock Album of the Year at the 2012 Juno Awards.

== Track listing ==
All songs written by Arkells.

No.	Title	Length
1.	"Book Club"	3:17
2.	"Where U Goin"	3:46
3.	"Michigan Left"	3:26
4.	"Coffee"	4:11
5.	"On Paper"	3:25
6.	"Kiss Cam"	3:43
7.	"One Foot Out the Door"	3:51
8.	"Bloodlines"	3:27
9.	"Whistleblower"	3:14
10.	"Agent Zero"	3:13
11.	"On Paper (In the Dark mix) iTunes bonus track"	3:30

== Personnel ==
- Max Kerman – vocals, guitar
- Mike DeAngelis – vocals, guitar
- Dan Griffin – vocals, keyboard, guitar, percussion, harmonica
- Nick Dika – bass
- Tim Oxford – drums, percussion
- Kathleen Edwards – guest vocals on "Agent Zero"
