= Jane Archibald =

Canadian operatic soprano

- Born: Truro, Nova Scotia, Canada
- Occupation: Operatic soprano
- Years active: 2005–Present
- Known for: Zerbinetta in Ariadne auf Naxos
- Awards: 2012 Juno Award; Classical Album of the Year
- Website: janearchibald.com

Jane Archibald is a Canadian operatic soprano from Nova Scotia. Born in Truro, she began her professional opera career in Canada before joining the San Francisco Opera as an Adler Fellow. Her career was elevated by a performance as Zerbinetta in Ariadne auf Naxos in 2007, a role she has reprised more than any other. Her first solo CD was the winner of a 2012 Juno Award for Classical Album of the Year.

== Early life and education ==
Jane Archibald was born in Truro, Nova Scotia. Her father was a physician, and her mother worked for the government. She attended high school at Cobequid Educational Centre, and went on to earn a Bachelor of Music from Wilfrid Laurier University. She began taking solo voice lessons at the age of 11, and sang in choirs such as the First Baptist Girls' Choir during her youth.

== Career ==
Archibald began her career in professional opera in Canada, before joining the San Francisco Opera as an Adler Fellow in 2005, making her debut as Elvira in Rossini's L'Italiana in Algeri. After undertaking a training program through San Francisco Opera, she sang her debut at the Vienna State Opera as Queen of the Night in Mozart's Die Zauberflöte. Her career gained momentum in 2007 when she stepped in as Zerbinetta in Ariadne auf Naxos by R. Strauss at the Geneva and Vienna State Operas, earning critical acclaim. Zerbinetta became one of Archibald's signature roles, reprised more than any other. During her time with the Vienna State Opera, she sang other roles such as Sophie in Der Rosenkavalier by R. Strauss.

Archibald made her debut with the Metropolitan Opera as Ophélie in Hamlet by Ambroise Thomas in 2010, stepping in for the French soprano Natalie Dessay. In 2013, she returned to the Metropolitan Opera as Adele in Die Fledermaus by J. Strauss. With the Canadian Opera Company, she performed the title role in Sémélé by Marin Marais in 2012 and 2015. Her first solo CD was released by ATMA Classique and was the winner of a 2012 Juno Award for Classical Album of the Year.

In 2017, Archibald was appointed as the artist-in-residence for the Canadian Opera Company's 2017/2018 season, during which she sang Konstanze in Mozart's Die. Her other roles have included the title role in Handel's Alcina with the Glyndebourne Festival and Cunegonde in Bernstein's Candide with the London Symphony Orchestra.

== Personal life ==
Archibald is married to the tenor Kurt Streit, which whom she has two children. She met him in 2009 while singing a performance of Haydn's Orlando Paladino with the Berlin Philharmonic.

== Discography ==
- Haydn, Joseph; Archibald, Jane; Rösner, Thomas; Biennes Symfoniorkester (2011), Haydn arias (in Italian), Disques Atma, OCLC 871436802
- Charpentier, Marc-Antoine; Archibald, Jane; Newman, Marion; Ainsworth, Colin; Tomkins, Giles; Mallon, Kevin (2004), Messe de minuit pour Noël (in Latin), Krefeld: Naxos, OCLC 938672243
- Bernstein, Leonard; Wheeler, Hugh; Wilbur, Richard; Archibald, Jane; Otter, Anne Sofie von; Capalbo, Leonardo; Atkins, Thomas; Allen, Thomas; Farnsworth, Marcus; Alsop, Marin; London Symphony Orchestra; London Symphony Chorus (2021), Candide, London: LSO Live, OCLC 1311403858
- Strauss, Johann; Phillips, Susanna; Archibald, Jane; Costanzo, Anthony Roth; Fabiano, Michael; Maltman, Christopher; Szot, Paulo; Fischer, Ádám; Metropolitan Opera (New York, N.Y.) (2014), Die Fledermaus, [New York, New York]: [Metropolitan Opera], OCLC 889873105
- Kohlhepp, Sebastian; Bršlík, Pavol; Archibald, Jane; Morley, Erin; Thielemann, Christian; Lehár, Franz; Unitel (2019), Christian Thielemann conducts Franz Lehár's The Land of Smiles : Staatskapelle Dresden, Unitel, OCLC 1190903629
- Archibald, Jane; Millar, Cynthia; Brown, Michael (2017), Messiaen: Poèmes Pour Mi ; Trois Petites Liturgies De La Présence Divine (in French), [United States]: Seattle Symphony Media, OCLC 1038411286
- Vivaldi, Antonio; Archibald, Jane; Boer, Michele de; Krause, Anita; Brown, Nils; Mahon, Peter; Tomkins, Giles; Mallon, Kevin; Aradia Ensemble; Aradia Chorus (2004), Vivaldi sacred music. 1, [Germany]: Naxos, OCLC 811257770
- Strauss, Richard; Rückert, Friedrich; Schiller, Friedrich; Archibald, Jane; Pecková, Dagmar; Stoklossa, Eric; Gleadow, Robert; Equilbey, Laurence; Latvijas Radio koris; Accentus (Musical group) (2009), A cappella (in German), [France]: Naïve, OCLC 811550292
- Strauss, Richard; Hofmannsthal, Hugo von; Arlaud, Philippe; Large, Brian; Fleming, Renée; Koch, Sophie; Schulte, Eike Wilm; Smith, Robert Dean; Archibald, Jane; Thielemann, Christian; Staatskapelle Dresden (2012), Ariadne auf Naxos Oper in einem Prolog und einem Akt (in German), [Mainz]: ZDF [u.a.], OCLC 984763870
- Mozart, Wolfgang Amadeus; Rhorer, Jérémie; Archibald, Jane; Reinhardt, Norman (2019), Die Entführung aus dem Serail (in German), [Europe], [France]: Alpha classics, Outhere music France, OCLC 1182594143
