= Learn & Burn =

Studio album by The Sheepdogs
- Released: 23 February 2010; 22 May 2011 (re-release)
- Genre: Garage rock, indie rock, blues rock
- Length: 38:05
- Label: Self-released

The Sheepdogs chronology
The Sheepdogs' Big Stand (2008)	Learn & Burn (2010)	Five Easy Pieces (2011)

Learn & Burn is the third studio album from Canadian rock band The Sheepdogs, originally released in 2010, and re-released on May 22, 2011. The album peaked at number 14 on the Canadian Albums Chart.

The album won the award for Rock Album of the Year at the 2012 Juno Awards. The album's first single, "I Don't Know", won the Juno Award for Single of the Year. On February 5, 2013, the album was certified Platinum in Canada.

Professional ratings
Review scores
Source	Rating
Sputnik Music	4.5/5 stars
Amazon	5/5 stars
MV Remix	(Highly Favorable)

== Track listing ==
All songs written by Ewan Currie.

=== Side one ===
No.	Title	Length
1.	"The One You Belong To"	2:33
2.	"Please Don't Lead Me On"	2:06
3.	"I Don't Know"	3:06
4.	"I Don't Get By"	2:56
5.	"Learn & Burn"	4:41
6.	"Right On"	2:58
7.	"You Discover"	0:58

=== Side two ===
No.	Title	Length
8.	"Southern Dreaming"	4:06
9.	"Soldier Boy"	2:03
10.	"Catfish 2 Boogaloo"	4:08
11.	"Rollo Tomasi"	3:16
12.	"Medley: Suddenly/Baby, I Won't Do You No Harm/We'll Get There/I Should Know"	5:14

=== CD bonus tracks ===
No.	Title	Length
13.	"Birthday"	3:00
14.	"Slim Pickens"	3:13

== Awards and nominations ==
Year	Event	Award	Result
2011	CASBY Awards	Favourite Indie Album	Won
2011	CASBY Awards	Favourite New Album	Won
2011	Western Canadian Music Awards	Rock Recording of the Year	Won
2012	Juno Awards	Rock Album of the Year	Won
