= High Noon (Arkells album) =

Studio album by Arkells
- Released: August 5, 2014
- Recorded: 2013 at The Hobby Shop, Los Angeles, California
- Genre: Rock
- Length: 41:23
- Labels: Dine Alone Records, Universal Music Canada
- Producer: Tony Hoffer

Arkells chronology
Michigan Left (2012)	High Noon (2014)	Study Music (2015)

Professional ratings
Aggregate scores
Source	Rating
Metacritic	74/100
Review scores
Source	Rating
AllMusic	3.5/5 stars
Paste	7.0/10
PopMatters	7/10 stars

High Noon is the third full-length studio album by Canadian rock band Arkells. It was announced on May 13, 2014, that the album would be released on August 5, 2014. The album sold 5,200 copies in its first week and debuted at #3 on the Canadian Albums Chart. It is the band's highest position on that chart in their history. By September 2015, High Noon had sold over 40,000 copies and was certified a Gold Record. The album art features an F-117 Nighthawk.

The album is a longlisted nominee for the 2015 Polaris Music Prize.

== Track listing ==
All songs written by Arkells.

No.	Title	Length
1.	"Fake Money"	3:31
2.	"Come To Light"	3:33
3.	"Cynical Bastards"	3:37
4.	"11:11"	3:40
5.	"Never Thought That This Would Happen"	4:50
6.	"Dirty Blonde"	3:33
7.	"What Are You Holding On To?"	3:40
8.	"Hey Kids!"	3:24
9.	"Leather Jacket"	3:56
10.	"Crawling Through The Window"	3:48
11.	"Systematic"	3:51
12.	"11:11 (Acoustic) iTunes bonus track"	3:27
13.	"What Are You Holding On To? (Acoustic) iTunes bonus track"	3:38

== Personnel ==
Arkells

- Max Kerman – lead vocals, guitar
- Micheal DeAngelis – guitar, vocals
- Anthony Carone – keyboards, vocals, strings, arranger
- Nick Dika – bass guitar
- Tim Oxford – drums, percussion

Musicians

- Ernesto Barahona – trombone
- Leland Whitty – tenor saxophone
- Dana Grey – baritone saxophone
- Christine Chesebrough – violin
- Kelly Lefaive – violin
- Emma Vachon-Tweeny – viola
- Igor Saika-Voivod – score, conductor, cello

Technical

- Cameron Lister – recording engineer
- Tony Hoffer – producer, mix engineer
- Eric Ratz – producer, engineer (tracks: 1, 3, 9); mix engineer (tracks: 1, 3, 7, 9)
- Harry Hess – mastering engineer

Art and Management

- Micheal DeAngelis – cover
- Brooks Reynolds – photography
- Tom Sarig – management
