= I Don't Know (The Sheepdogs song) =

Single by The Sheepdogs

from the album Learn & Burn
- Released: 2011
- Genre: Boogie rock
- Length: 3:06
- Songwriter(s): Ewan Currie

The Sheepdogs singles chronology
"I Don't Know" (2011)	"Who?" (2011)

"I Don't Know" is a single from the Canadian band The Sheepdogs. It was featured as the third track on their third album, Learn & Burn.

== Versions ==
Two recorded versions of the song exist. One is found on the album Learn & Burn, while the other is on the EP Five Easy Pieces. The differences between them are noticeable but not substantial; Canadian modern rock and active rock stations generally play the Five Easy Pieces version.

== Awards and nominations ==
On April 1, "I Don't Know" won the Juno Award for Single of the Year. It beat out "Fragile Bird" by City and Colour, "Invincible" by Hedley, "When We Stand Together" by Nickelback and "Let's Go Higher" by Johnny Reid. Several media sources, including The Globe and Mail and The Winnipeg Free Press considered their win to be an upset.

== Charts ==
Chart (2011)	Peak position
Canadian Hot 100	48
Canada Alternative	3
Canada Rock	1
