= The Sheepdogs =

Canadian rock band

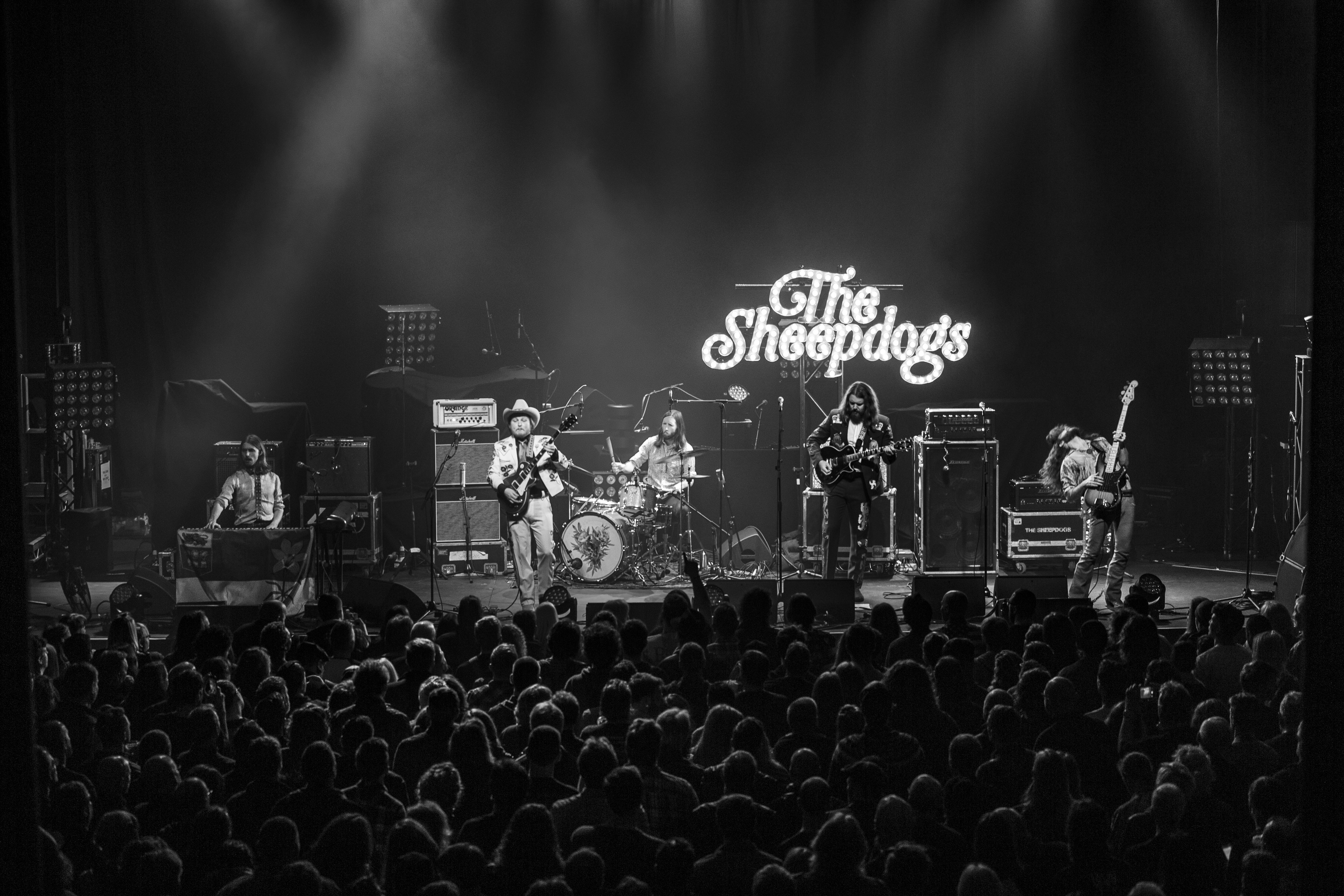
- The Sheepdogs performing at the Roundhouse in Chalk Farm, London, 2019

Background information
- Origin: Saskatoon, Saskatchewan, Canada
- Genres: Southern rock; blues rock
- Years active: 2004–present
- Labels: Right On Records; Warner Canada; Dine Alone; Atlantic
- Members: Ewan Currie; Ryan Gullen; Ricky Paquette; Shamus Currie
- Past members: Leot Hanson; Rusty Matyas; Jimmy Bowskill; Sam Corbett
- Website: thesheepdogs.com

The Sheepdogs are a Canadian rock band formed in Saskatoon, Saskatchewan, in 2004. The Sheepdogs were the first unsigned band to make the cover of Rolling Stone and have gone on to a career featuring multi-platinum album sales and four Juno Awards.

Frontman Ewan Currie, the band's primary songwriter, has described the band's guitar-driven blues-rock style as "pure, simple, good-time music"; he's said that the band aims to "land in the sweet spot in between Led Zeppelin and Crosby, Stills & Nash". Currie has further credited Creedence Clearwater Revival, Stevie Wonder, The Beatles, and The Allman Brothers Band as influences on the band's style.

One critic has praised the band's "infectiously catchy, soulful, retro sound with beautiful harmonies and a pinch of southern rock."

The Sheepdogs are on the road frequently between recordings. They have headlined tours across Canada and the United States, the United Kingdom, Eastern and Western Europe, and Australia, and have performed at a number of large festivals including South by Southwest, Coachella, Glastonbury, Bonnaroo, and Lollapalooza.

== History ==
=== Early history and formation: The Breaks EP, Trying to Grow, The Big Stand, Learn & Burn (2004–2010) ===
The band formed in Saskatoon, Saskatchewan, in the summer of 2004, while Ewan Currie, Ryan Gullen, and Sam Corbett were all studying at the University of Saskatchewan. Corbett had an old bass guitar and a gift certificate to a local music store, so they rented a drum kit and started playing in Corbett's parents' basement with Corbett on drums, Gullen playing the bass, and Currie playing a recently purchased electric guitar. The band began with a repertoire of 1970s blues-rock songs as well as newer material, including covers of the early Black Keys and Kings of Leon, while also writing their own music. Currie, Gullen, and Corbett called their trio The Breaks and released an EP in 2006.

In the summer of 2006, Currie, Gullen, and Corbett met Leot Hanson, who was playing acoustic guitar at a party. Hanson was playing a Kings of Leon song from Youth & Young Manhood, and the trio joined in. The next day, Hanson joined the band and they changed their name to The Sheepdogs.

In 2006, The Sheepdogs independently released their first album Trying to Grow, which they recorded at Cosmic Pad Studios in Saskatoon. Two years later, after almost constant touring, The Sheepdogs returned to Cosmic Pad Studios to record their second album, Big Stand. The first two records were small affairs, including artwork by friends and family, and were mixed by the band.

The band released its third studio album, Learn & Burn, in 2010. The band recorded the album on their own, with their own equipment, a circumstance which they appreciated for giving them freedom to explore new sounds and techniques, including a nod to the psychedelic rock of the 1960s.

=== Rolling Stone cover contest: Learn & Burn Deluxe, Five Easy Pieces EP (2011) ===
In early 2011, a music manager that the band had met in Toronto, Ontario, submitted a demo tape to Atlantic Records, which resulted in them being one of 16 bands chosen to be part of the Rolling Stone "Choose the Cover" competition. With the new international spotlight on the band and while the band was waiting to find out the results of the contest, Learn & Burn was given a re-release, in May. That summer, the Sheepdogs beat fifteen other bands to win the contest, and were featured on the August 18, 2011, cover of Rolling Stone—the first unsigned act to do so. During the competition, the band made appearances on Late Night with Jimmy Fallon and performed at the Bonnaroo Music Festival as well as The Osheaga Festival in Montreal, Quebec. The Sheepdogs also appeared on Project Runway, Season 9, Episode 9, titled "Image is Everything" (which originally aired in September 2011) and were the subject of an editorial spread in both Rolling Stone and Marie Claire magazines.

The Rolling Stone cover arrived on the heels of the band's Five Easy Pieces EP, which debuted at No. 7 on the Canadian Albums Chart, selling 3,300 copies. Following the contest win, the band signed with Atlantic Records.

In April 2012, the re-released Learn & Burn garnered three Juno Awards—for Rock Album of the Year, Best New Group, and Single of the Year. The band was touring in Australia with John Fogerty at the time and were unable to attend the ceremony.

=== International touring and personnel changes: (The Sheepdogs) (2012–2014) ===
In early 2012, the Sheepdogs began work on a new album which was produced by The Black Keys drummer Patrick Carney, recorded during an intensive two-week session at Haptown Studios in Nashville, Tennessee. Released on September 4, 2012, the band's self-titled major-label debut garnered them their second platinum sales certification. The album generated international interest, and led to a long stretch of touring, both in Canada and overseas, from 2012 into 2013 including performances at Coachella Music Festival, Lollapalooza, Bonaroo, Edgefest, Glastonbury, and Ottawa Bluesfest.

This tour saw Shamus Currie, younger brother of lead singer Ewan Currie, become a touring member of the Sheepdogs, after having previously played trombone on The Big Stand and Learn & Burn.

The Sheepdogs earned three Juno nominations for Single of the Year, Rock Album of the Year and Group of the Year, in addition to performing "Feeling Good" live on the broadcast at the 2013 Juno Awards in Regina, Saskatchewan.

On November 24, 2013, The Sheepdogs performed at the CFL's 101st Grey Cup live on television. The game saw their home province Saskatchewan Roughriders beat the Hamilton Tiger Cats.

In March 2014, director Matt Barnes and the Sheepdogs won the Juno Award for Video of the Year for "Feeling Good." That same year the band played tribute to and inducted Bachman Turner Overdrive into the Canadian Music Hall of Fame, performing "Let it Ride" and "Takin’ Care of Business" with BTO live on the Juno Award broadcast. In July 2014, Leot Hanson left the band. Following his departure, Winnipeg guitarist Rusty Matyas, a friend of the band, stepped in as guitarist for the tour promoting The Sheepdogs. This led to Matyas joining the band as a full-time touring and recording member until the fall of 2015.

=== Addition of Jimmy Bowskill: Future Nostalgia (2015–2016) ===
On July 3, 2015, the band released "Downtown," the first single from what would be their fifth studio album Future Nostalgia. The album itself was released on October 2, 2015, via Warner Music Canada and Dine Alone Records. The 18-track record was well received by reviewers and fans, nearing the top of the iTunes Canadian charts. Future Nostalgia was recorded in a rented cottage in Stony Lake, Ontario, engineered by Matt Ross-Spang, and produced by lead singer and songwriter Ewan Currie. Currie explained the choice, saying: "We wanted to cut out all the noise and get back to a place where we could just fully immerse ourselves in music." The band worked on the album full-time in Stony Lake, seeking some middle ground between the informal garage sound of the Learn & Burn and the whirlwind sessions in Nashville with Carney which produced The Sheepdogs.

In November 2015, award-winning blues guitarist Jimmy Bowskill from Bailieboro, Ontario, joined the band in advance of the European leg of their Future Nostalgia Tour, playing guitar and pedal steel.

Future Nostalgia garnered the Sheepdogs another Juno nomination for Rock Album of the year in 2016.

When they were finished recording Future Nostalgia, brothers Ewan and Shamus Currie started working on a side project they called BROS. Their debut LP, titled Vol.1, was released on October 14, 2016, via Dine Alone Records.

=== International expansion: Changing Colours (2017–2019) ===
When it came time to record again, instead of being produced in a concentrated burst, the band's next album, Changing Colours was recorded over an unusually extended period in 2017. The 17-track album was engineered, co-produced, and mixed by Thomas D'Arcy at Taurus Recording in Toronto, with Ewan Currie again in the producer role, and was released in February 2018. "Most of the records we've made have been under a short time constraint," drummer Sam Corbett is quoted as saying. "This one was done over six months, with some songs sitting around for two months. Then we'd come back and try different things, so I think that as a result, some of the songs took a different shape."

The Changing Colours sessions also marked the recording debut of guitarist Jimmy Bowskill, performing not only guitar but mandolin, banjo, viola, fiddle, and pedal steel. "He joined us on tour, learned our whole set basically in one rehearsal and has been with us ever since," says bass player Ryan Gullen.

The promotion of the album again saw the Sheepdogs embarking on multiple national and international tours, playing over 200 shows in Canada, Europe and the United States.

Corbett announced in October 2018 that he would not tour with the band in the United States and Europe after being diagnosed with cancer. He underwent surgery in the summer of that year and began further treatment in the fall. Corbett resumed his post in the band on New Year's Eve for a show in Niagara Falls, Ontario, that was broadcast live on CBC Television. On December 22, 2018, Corbett announced his return in a Facebook post in which he also announced the birth of his first child.

In early 2019, the band continued their promotion and touring of Changing Colours by joining Rival Sons on tour first in Europe and then in the US, including dates at The Bataclan, Paris and The Sheepdogs first Scandinavian shows in Sweden, Denmark, and Oslo, Norway. 2019 also saw two Juno Award nominations for the band, this time for "Group of the Year" and for "Rock Album of the Year".

Frontman Ewan Currie recorded his debut solo album, Out of My Mind, in San Francisco, California. The album was released via Warner Music Canada on March 29, 2019.

In November 2019, the Sheepdogs performed two songs live on television as part of the NHL Heritage Classic at Mosaic Stadium in Regina, Saskatchewan.

=== Pandemic adjustments: No Simple Thing EP, Live at Lee's (2020–2021) ===
Coming off the international success of Changing Colours and subsequent busy touring schedule, the Sheepdogs announced in early 2020 that they would be embarking on a 10-date Canadian tour with The Black Keys.

It was also announced that the Sheepdogs would appear as part of the 2020 Juno Awards as presenters in their hometown of Saskatoon.

In March 2020, the COVID-19 pandemic stopped all touring and live performance activities. The Sheepdogs took part in a live CBC Canada Day performance on July 1, 2020, from Montreal, Quebec, marking their first performance since the beginning of the pandemic.

Following this performance the Sheepdogs stayed in Montreal and began tracking songs at MixART studios, tracking new songs together for the first time since the release of Changing Colours. The songs were recorded all in a room together, live off the floor to a Studer A827 24 2" tape machine.

In the summer and fall of 2020, the band performed a series of drive-in performances in Ontario and a concert series in Regina, Saskatchewan playing to hotel room balconies.

On April 30, 2021, it was announced that an EP, No Simple Thing would be released. The first single "Keep On Loving You" was released on that day.

With touring still not happening in a normal capacity, the Sheepdogs built a makeshift television studio and filmed a series of performance videos for every song on the album. The album garnered two top 5 singles in Canada. The band played a limited number of live performances in Canada in the summer of 2021 and performed at the halftime show at the annual Saskatchewan Roughrider game the Labour Day Classic at Mosaic Stadium in Regina.

In November 2021, coinciding with the return of full capacity indoor shows, the Sheepdogs announced they would be performing four nights at Lee's Palace in Toronto (November 17–20). The four sold-out shows were filmed and recorded. Live at Lee's, the band's first live album, was released in February 2022.

=== Lineup change and new album: Outta Sight (2022–present) ===
In the spring of 2022, the Sheepdogs announced an extensive world tour of nearly 100 dates including stops in the UK, Europe, and North America.

Shortly after this the band announced that their new album, Outta Sight, would be released in June 2022. The album's first single, "Find the Truth," was released April 2022.

In August 2022, the band announced that Jimmy Bowskill would be stepping away from touring with the band for the time being to focus on other projects. Guitarist Ricky Paquette joined the band on the North American tour starting in September 2022.

The Sheepdogs released their first Christmas song, "I'm Ready For Christmas," in December 2022.

The Live and Outta Sight Tour concluded in Ottawa January 2023 with a majority of the dates selling out across North America. In January, following the conclusion, additional dates in Australia were announced to take place in April.

Also in January, Outta Sight was nominated for a Juno Award for Rock Album of the year.

On September 18, 2025, it was announced via the band that drummer and vocalist, Sam Corbett, was leaving the band to focus on his family.

== Band members ==
=== Current ===
- Ewan Currie – lead vocals, guitars, keys, primary songwriter (2004–present)
- Ryan Gullen – bass, backing vocals (2004–present)
- Shamus Currie – keys, trombone, guitars, backing vocals (2012–present)
- Ricky Paquette – guitars, backing vocals (2022–present)
- Trevor Falls - Drums, (2025-present)

=== Former ===
- Leot Hanson – guitar, backing vocals (2006–2014)
- Rusty Matyas – guitar, backing vocals (2014–2015)
- Jimmy Bowskill – guitars, pedal steel guitar, violin, mandolin, backing vocals (2015–2022)
- Sam Corbett – drums, percussion, backing vocals (2004–2025)

== Side projects ==
- Brothers Ewan and Shamus Currie have recorded an album together in a project called BROS. The debut LP, Vol.1, was released in October 2016. A second album, Vol. 2, was released in July 2021.
- Front man Ewan Currie released his debut solo album, Out of My Mind, in March 2019.
- In November 2021, guitarist Ricky Paquette released his album Sparks, produced by Big Sugar's Gordie Johnson.
- In January 2023, it was announced that Shamus Currie would release a fantasy rock concept album The Shepherd and the Wolf was released on February 24, 2023. The first single, "Days of High Adventure," was released on January 6, 2023.
- In February 2023, it was announced that Sam Corbett would release a solo effort under the name Nutana, to be released on April 7, 2023.

== Discography ==
=== Albums ===
Title	Details	Peak chart positions		Certifications
Title	Details	CAN	US Heat	Certifications
Trying to Grow	Released: April 26, 2007; Label: Self-released; Formats: CD, digital download, vinyl	—	—	
The Sheepdogs' Big Stand	Released: April 12, 2008; Label: Self-released; Formats: CD, digital download, vinyl	—	—	
Learn & Burn	Released: February 23, 2010; Label: Self-released; Formats: CD, digital download, vinyl	14	—	MC: Platinum
The Sheepdogs	Released: September 4, 2012; Label: Atlantic; Formats: CD, digital download, vinyl	1	23	MC: Platinum
Future Nostalgia	Released: October 2, 2015; Label: Dine Alone, Warner Music Canada; Formats: CD, digital download, vinyl, cassette	11	—	
Changing Colours	Released: February 2, 2018; Label: Dine Alone, Warner Music Canada; Formats: CD, digital download, vinyl	5	—	
Outta Sight	Released: June 3, 2022; Label: Warner Music Canada; Formats: CD, digital download, vinyl	–	—	
Live at Lee's	Released: February 11, 2022; Label: Warner Music Canada; Formats: CD, digital download, vinyl	–	—	
Keep Out Of The Storm	Released: February 27, 2026; Label: Right On Records; Formats: CD, digital download, vinyl	–	—	
"—" denotes releases that did not chart

=== EPs ===
Title	Details	Peak chart positions	
Title	Details	CAN	US Heat
The Breaks EP	Released: 2006; Label: Self-released; Format: CD	—	—
Five Easy Pieces	Released: August 2, 2011; Label: Atlantic Records; Formats: CD, digital download, vinyl	7	18
No Simple Thing	Released: May 28, 2021; Label: Warner; Format: CD, vinyl, digital download	—	—
Paradise Alone	Released: August 22, 2024; Label: Right On Records; Format: Digital, CD, vinyl	—	—
Hell Together	Released: November 7, 2024; Label: Right On Records; Format: Digital, CD, vinyl	—	—
"—" denotes releases that did not chart

=== 7-inch vinyl releases ===
Title	Year
"Slim Pickens" / "Birthday"	2011
"Downtown" / "Rosalie"	2015
"Be Your Man" / "Really Wanna Be Your Man" (split 7-inch with Yukon Blonde)	2016

=== Singles ===
Title	Year	Chart peak		Certifications	Album
Title	Year	CAN	CAN Rock	Certifications	Album
"I Don't Know"	2010	48	2	MC: Platinum	Learn and Burn
"Who?"	2011	— (Note: "Who?" did not enter the Billboard Canadian Hot 100, but peaked at number 12 on the Canada Emerging Artists chart.)	5		Five Easy Pieces
"The Way It Is"	2012	59	1	MC: Gold	The Sheepdogs
"Feeling Good"	2012	70	1	MC: Platinum	The Sheepdogs
"How Late, How Long"	2013	— (Note: "How Late, How Long" did not enter the Billboard Canadian Hot 100, but peaked at number 22 on the Canada Emerging Artists chart.)	3		The Sheepdogs
"Downtown"	2015	—	4		Future Nostalgia
"I'm Gonna Be Myself"	2015	—	10		Future Nostalgia
"Bad Lieutenant"	2016	—	19		Future Nostalgia
"Back Down"	2016	—	46		Future Nostalgia
"I've Got a Hole Where My Heart Should Be"	2017	—	1		Changing Colours
"Nobody"	2018	—	9		Changing Colours
"Saturday Night"	2019	—	34		Changing Colours
"Keep on Loving You"	2021	— (Note: "Keep on Loving You" did not enter the Billboard Canadian Hot 100, but peaked at number 23 on the Canada Emerging Artists chart.)	2		No Simple Thing
"Rock and Roll (Ain't No Simple Thing)"	2021	—	10		No Simple Thing
"Find the Truth"	2022	—	13		Outta Sight
"I Wanna Know You"	2022	—	9		Outta Sight
"Down at the Khyber"	2025	—	—		Songs from the Gang
"—"denotes a release that did not chart.

=== Music videos ===
Year	Video	Director
2010	"I Don't Know"	Frank Guidoccio
2011	"I Don't Know"	Davin Black
2012	"The Way It Is"	Randy and Jason Sklar
2013	"Feeling Good"	Matt Barnes
2013	"How Late How Long"	The Sheepdogs
2015	"Downtown"	Matt Barnes
2016	"I'm Gonna Be Myself"	Sean L.T. Cartwright
2016	"Bad Lieutenant"	Michael Maxxis
2017	"I've Got A Hole Where My Heart Should Be"	Ryan Gullen and Mat Dunlap
2017	"Let It Roll" (live session)	Ryan Gullen and Mat Dunlap
2018	"Nobody"	Ryan Gullen and Mat Dunlap
2018	"Cool Down"/"Kiss the Brass Ring" (live session)	Ryan Gullen and Mat Dunlap
2018	"Up in Canada" (live session)	Ryan Gullen and Mat Dunlap
2018	"Born a Restless Man" (live session)	Ryan Gullen
2019	"Saturday Night"	Ryan Gullen and Mat Dunlap
2021	"Keep on Loving You"	Ryan Gullen and Mat Dunlap
2022	"Find the Truth"	Mat Dunlap
2022	"I Wanna Know You"	Ryan Gullen and Mat Dunlap
2022	"Scarborough Street Fight" (live)	Ryan Gullen and Mat Dunlap
2022	"Roughrider '98" (live)	Mat Dunlap

== Filmography ==
=== Film ===
Year	Title	Role
2012	The Sheepdogs Have At It	Themselves

=== Television ===
Year	Title	Role	Notes
2011	Late Night with Jimmy Fallon	Themselves	June 15, 2011 (season 2, episode 459); August 2, 2011 (season 2, episode 483)
2011	Project Runway	Themselves	"Image Is Everything" (season 9, episode 9)
2011	the neighbors dog	Themselves	"The Sheepdogs" (season 2, episode 1)
2012	MTV Live (Canada)	Themselves	September 22, 2012, season 7

== Awards and nominations ==
Year	Nominated work	Event	Award	Result
2011	Themselves	CASBY Awards	Favourite New Artist	Won
2011	Learn & Burn	CASBY Awards	Favourite Indie Album	Won
2011	Learn & Burn	CASBY Awards	Favourite New Album	Won
2011	Learn & Burn	Western Canadian Music Awards	Rock Recording of the Year	Won
2011	Themselves	CBC Radio 3 Bucky Awards	Best Live Act	Nominated
2012	"I Don't Know"	Juno Awards	Single of the Year	Won
2012	Learn & Burn	Juno Awards	Rock Album of the Year	Won
2012	Themselves	Juno Awards	New Group of the Year	Won
2012	Learn & Burn	High Times Doobie Award	Alternative Album of the Year	Won
2012	"I Don't Know"	Much Music Video Award	Rock Video of the Year	Won
2013	"The Way It Is"	Juno Awards	Single of the Year	Nominated
2013	The Sheepdogs	Juno Awards	Album of the Year	Nominated
2013	Themselves	Juno Awards	Group of the Year	Nominated
2013	"Feeling Good"	Much Music Video Award	Rock Video of the Year	Nominated
2013	"Feeling Good"	Much Music Video Award	Post Production of the Year	Nominated
2014	"Feeling Good"	Juno Awards	Video of the Year	Won
2016	Future Nostalgia	Juno Awards	Rock Album of the Year	Nominated
2016	"Gonna Be Myself"	Much Music Video Award	Rock Video of the Year	Nominated
2019	Changing Colours	Juno Awards	Rock album of the year	Nominated
2019	Themselves	Juno Awards	Group of the Year	Nominated
2023	Outta Sight	Juno Awards	Rock album of the year	Nominated
