= Future Nostalgia (The Sheepdogs album) =

Studio album by The Sheepdogs
- Released: October 2, 2015
- Recorded: 2015 in Stony Lake, Ontario
- Genre: Southern rock, boogie rock, rock, blues rock
- Length: 49:48
- Label: Dine Alone Records; Warner Music Canada
- Producer: Ewan Currie

The Sheepdogs chronology
The Sheepdogs (2012)	Future Nostalgia (2015)	Changing Colours (2018)

Singles from Future Nostalgia
- 1. "Downtown" Released: July 2015; 2. "I'm Gonna Be Myself" Released: 2015; 3. "Bad Lieutenant" Released: 2016; 4. "Back Down" Released: 2016

Future Nostalgia is the fifth studio album by Canadian rock band The Sheepdogs, and serves as a follow-up to the band's previous release, The Sheepdogs. The album was released on October 2, 2015 via Warner Music Canada. The album peaked at No. 11 on Billboard's Canadian Albums Chart on October 24, 2015. The album was recorded in a cabin in Stony Lake, Ontario. The album was produced by the band instead of a "big name producer", and in an interview the band stated, "We wanted to get back to a homemade approach. [...] We wanted to be away from any scene or distraction and keep it real simple."

== Reception ==
Professional ratings
Review scores
Source	Rating
AllMusic	4/5 stars

Sarah Murphy of Exclaim! wrote, "the band's latest LP hears them moving forward sonically, while still throwing back the golden days of classic rock". James Christopher Monger of AllMusic compared the band to the Guess Who and Bachman–Turner Overdrive, and wrote that the album contains "expertly played Queen-style guitarmonies, stadium-ready singalongs, boogie rock backbeats, Rhodes electric piano solos, and stories about good times gone bad/bad times gone good."

== Track listing ==
All songs written by Ewan Currie.

No.	Title	Length
1.	"I'm Gonna Be Myself"	2:42
2.	"I Really Wanna Be Your Man"	3:18
3.	"Downtown"	3:36
4.	"Jim Gordon"	2:46
5.	"Bad Lieutenant"	3:41
6.	"Jim Sullivan"	2:07
7.	"Back Down"	2:17
8.	"Help Us All"	4:19
9.	"Take a Trip"	4:16
10.	"Same Old Feeling"	2:34
11.	"Nothing All of the Time"	4:00
12.	"Darryl & Dwight"	4:02
13.	"Medley: I) Where I Can Roam"	2:09
14.	"Medley: II) The Bridge City Turnaround"	1:16
15.	"Medley: III) Plastic Man"	2:40
16.	"Medley: IV) Giving It Up (For My Baby)"	1:53
17.	"Medley: V) I Get By"	0:27
18.	"Medley: VI) Where I Can Roam (Reprise)"	1:45

== Personnel ==
The Sheepdogs

- Ewan Currie – lead vocals, guitars, clarinet, bongos, Roland synth, piano
- Shamus Currie – Hammond organ, piano, Wurlitzer, Farfisa, trombone, backing vocals, guitar, percussion
- Ryan Gullen – bass, backing vocals, percussion
- Sam Corbett – drums, backing vocals, percussion
- Rusty Matyas – guitars, backing vocals, trumpet, Wurlitzer, percussion

Additional musicians

- Travis Good – guitar on "Help Us All" and "Plastic Man"
- Lucas Goetz – pedal steel on "Plastic Man"

Production

- Matt Ross-Spang – engineering
- Vance Powell – mixing
- Richard Dodd – mastering
- Thomas D'Arcy – engineering on "Back Down"
- Mat Dunlap – artwork
