= Sam Roberts discography =

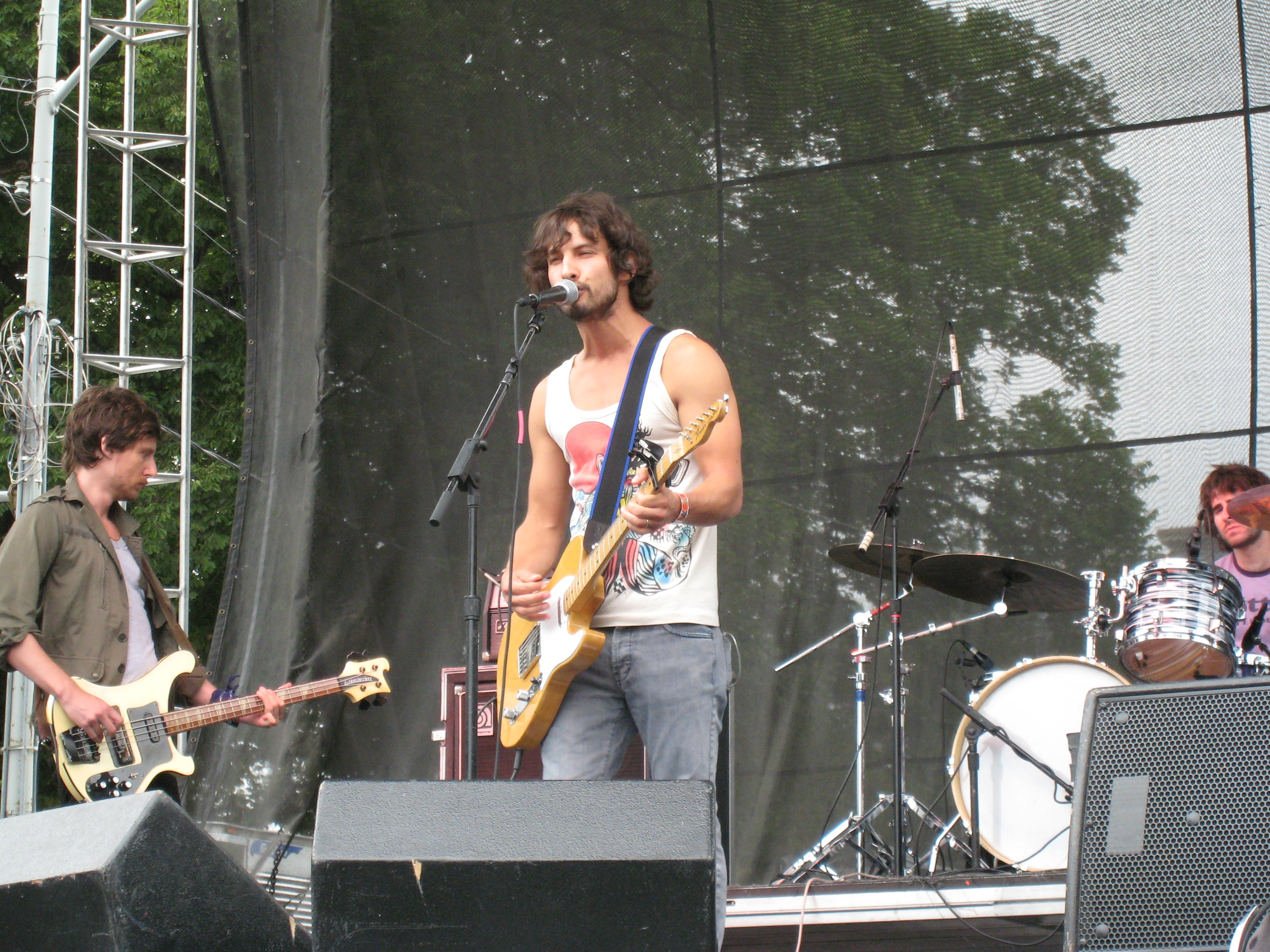
- Sam Roberts singing at Lollapalooza in 2007.
- Studio albums: 8
- Extended plays: 4
- Singles: 20
- Music videos: 12

This is the full discography for the Canadian rock musician Sam Roberts who is signed to Universal (Canada) since 2001. In 2000, Roberts recorded a set of demos entitled "Brother Down". Some of these songs appeared on later albums, including the song "Brother Down" which appeared on Roberts' 2002 release "The Inhuman Condition" EP. The latter reached the charts in Canada. Since then Roberts has released six albums, four EPs and a number of singles.

== Albums ==
=== Studio albums ===
Year	Album	Chart positions		Certifications	Sales
Year	Album	CAN	US Heat	Certifications	Sales
2003	We Were Born in a Flame: Released: June 17, 2003; Label: Universal Music Canada	2	—	MC: 2× Platinum	CAN: 145,000
2006	Chemical City: Released: May 16, 2006; Label: Universal Music Canada	3	—	MC: Platinum	
2008	Love at the End of the World: Released: May 20, 2008; Label: Universal Music Canada	1	47	MC: Gold	CAN: 9,000 (first week)
2011	Collider: Released: May 10, 2011; Label: Universal Music Canada	3	—		CAN: 7,000 (first week)
2014	Lo-Fantasy: Released: February 11, 2014; Label: Universal Music Canada	3	35		CAN: 5,800 (first week)
2016	TerraForm: Released: October 28, 2016; Label: Universal Music Canada	8	—		
2020	All Of Us: Released: October 16, 2020; Label: Universal Music Canada	56	—		
2023	The Adventures Of Ben Blank: Released: October 20, 2023; Label: Known Accomplice	—	—		

=== EPs ===
Year	Album	Chart Positions	Certification
Year	Album	CAN	Certification
2002	The Inhuman Condition: Released: July 16, 2002; Label: MapleMusic Recordings	32	MC: Gold
2004	Rolling Stone Original: Released: November 16, 2004; Label: Lost Highway Records; US download-only release	-	-
2011	iTunes Live from Montreal: Released: October 24, 2011; Label: Universal Music Canada; iTunes download-only release	-	-
2015	Counting The Days: Released: April 18, 2015; Label: Paper Bag Records / Universal Music Canada; 12" vinyl Record Store Day release, later followed by a digital release	-	-

== Singles ==
Year	Title	Peak chart positions			Certifications	Album
Year	Title	CAN	CAN Alt	CAN Rock	Certifications	Album
2002	"Brother Down"	2	×	3		The Inhuman Condition
2002	"Don't Walk Away Eileen"	—	×	4		The Inhuman Condition
2003	"Where Have All the Good People Gone?"	29	×	×	MC: Gold	We Were Born in a Flame
2003	"Hard Road"	—	×	25		We Were Born in a Flame
2003	"Dead End/Every Part of Me"	—	×	—		We Were Born in a Flame
2006	"The Gate"	—	×	1		Chemical City
2006	"Bridge to Nowhere"	—	×	8		Chemical City
2006	"With a Bullet"	—	×	10		Chemical City
2008	"Them Kids"	36	×	1		Love at the End of the World
2008	"Detroit '67"	82	×	15		Love at the End of the World
2009	"Fixed to Ruin"	—	×	15		Love at the End of the World
2011	"I Feel You"	83	3	3		Collider
2011	"The Last Crusade"	—	44	—		Collider
2011	"Without a Map"	—	16	29		Collider
2012	"Let It In"	—	6	16		Collider
2013	"We're All In This Together"	70	3	1		Lo-Fantasy
2013	"Shapeshifters"	—	—	—		Lo-Fantasy
2014	"Human Heat"	—	7	3		Lo-Fantasy
2014	"Kid Icarus"	—	12	27		Lo-Fantasy
2016	"If You Want It"	—	2	2		TerraForm
2016	"FIEND"	—	34	41		TerraForm
2017	"Rogue Empire"	—	—	—		TerraForm
2020	"Ascension"	—	—	5		All Of Us
2020	"I Like The Way You Talk About The Future"	—	—	—		All Of Us
2020	"Youth"	—	—	—		All Of Us
2021	"All Of Us"	—	—	—		All Of Us
2021	"Take Me Away"	—	—	15		All Of Us
2023	"Picture of Love"	—	—	21		The Adventures Of Ben Blank
2023	"I Dream Of You"	—	—	—		The Adventures Of Ben Blank
2023	"Afterlife"	—	29	40		The Adventures Of Ben Blank
"—" denotes releases that did not chart. "×" denotes periods where charts did not exist or were not archived.

== Miscellaneous ==
These songs have not appeared on a studio album released by Roberts:

Year	Song	Collaborating Artist	Album
2003	"Never Destroy Us"	The Dears	No Cities Left
2004	"Dirty Water"	K-os	Joyful Rebellion
2006	"Valhalla"	K-os	Atlantis: Hymns for Disco
2006	"Magic On My Mind"	n/a	Help! A Day In The Life compilation
2006	"Late In The Evening [live]"	n/a	Hommage à / Tribute to Paul Simon compilation
2006	"You Can Call Me Al [live]"	n/a	Hommage à / Tribute to Paul Simon compilation
2008	"Marvin The Meerkat"	n/a	Roll Play 2 compilation
2009	"I'm Running"	Misstress Barbara	I'm No Human
2009	"Dark Eyes"	n/a	Victoria Day soundtrack
2010	"Wavin' Flag"	Young Artists For Haiti	Wavin' Flag single
2010	"One Good Time"	Anthony D'Amato	Down Wires
2011	"Loin d'ici"	Cœur de pirate	Blonde
2012	"Let It In (King Britt’s Je Ne Sais Quoi Mix)"	King Britt	
2012	"Faultline Blues"	n/a	Esquire Presents: Pacific Standard Time
2013	"Don't Touch"	K-os	Black On Blonde
2013	"History Repeated"	Maestro Fresh Wes	Orchestrated Noize
2014	"Protector"	Kandle	In Flames
2016	"Life As It Happens"	Krief	Automanic
2020	"Instant Nightmare!"	The Dears	Lovers Rock

== Music videos ==
Video	Director
"Brother Down"	James Cooper
"Don't Walk Away Eileen"	Maxime Giroux
"Where Have All the Good People Gone?"	Kyle Davison
"Hard Road"	Kyle Davison
"The Gate"	Christopher Mills
"Bridge to Nowhere"	Dave Pawsey
"Them Kids"	Dave Pawsey
"Detroit '67"	Dave Pawsey
"I Feel You"	Dave Pawsey/Jonathan Legris
"Without A Map"	Malcolm Hearn
"We're All In This Together"	George Vale
"Shapeshifters"	Dave Pawsey
"If You Want It"	Amit Dabrai
