= Belgrave =

Belgrave may refer to:

== Places ==
- Belgrave, Cheshire, an English village
- Belgrave, Leicester an English district
- Belgrave, Victoria, a suburb of Melbourne, Australia
  - Belgrave railway line
  - Belgrave railway station, Melbourne
  - Belgrave (Puffing Billy) railway station, Melbourne, a narrow-gauge railway station
- Belgrave Square, a square in London, England
- Belgrave, Tamworth, a district of Tamworth, England
- Belgrave, Ontario, a community within North Huron municipality

== Other uses ==
- Belgrave (name), a surname and given name
- Belgrave (band), a Canadian pop band
  - Belgrave (album), Belgrave's self-titled album
- Belgrave Harriers, an athletics club in London, U.K.
- Belgrave Hospital for Children, former hospital in London
- Belgrave Trust, a green technology business, based in New York, U.S.
- Château Belgrave, a winery in the Bordeaux region of France
- Mount Belgrave, a mountain of Victoria Land, Antarctica
- Belgrave Wanderers F.C., a football club in Guernsey
