= The High Dials =

Canadian indie rock band

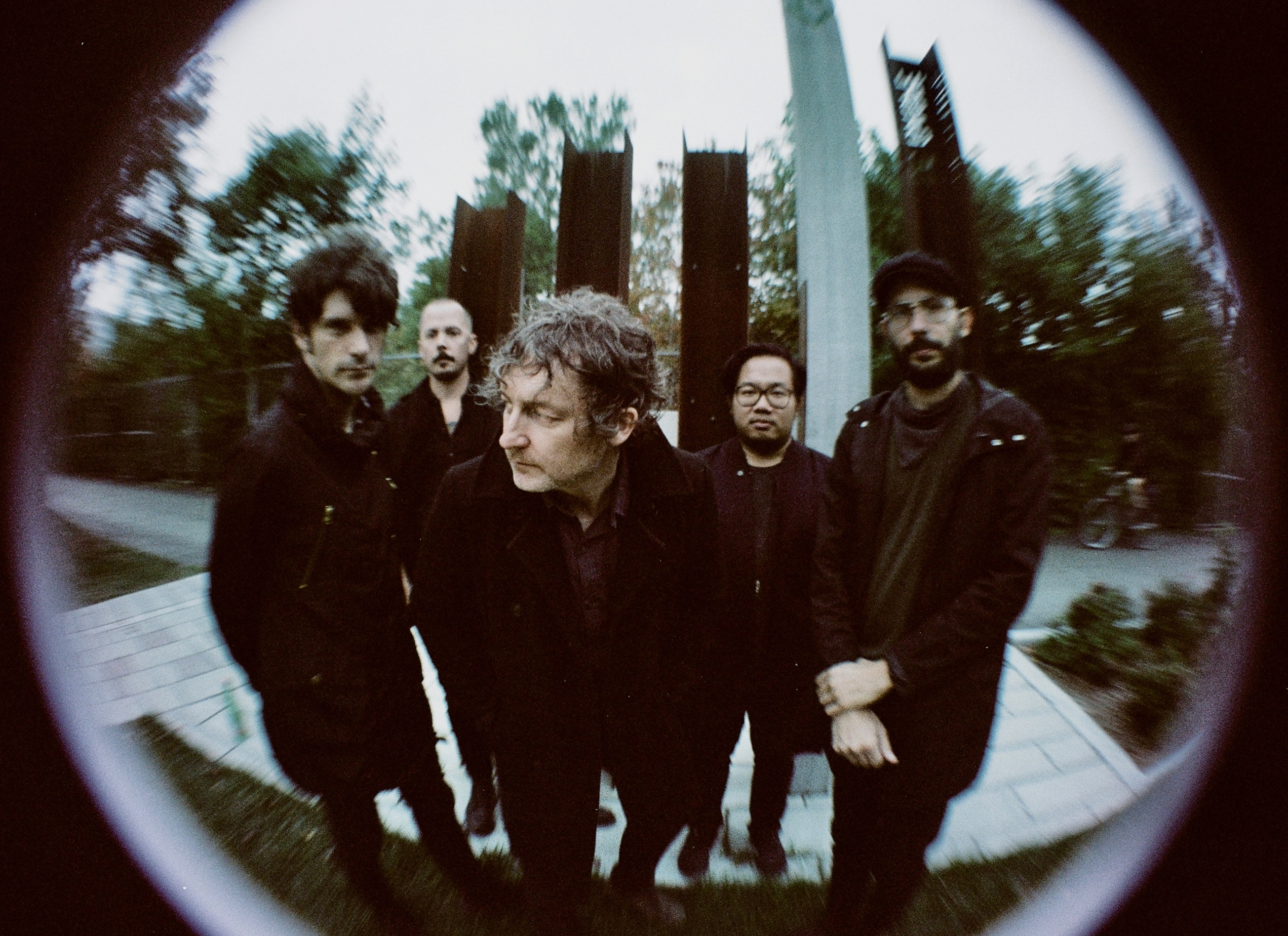
- The High Dials in 2018. Press photo by Mila Aung-Thwin.

Background information
- Origin: Montreal, Quebec, Canada
- Genres: Indie pop Power pop Neo-psychedelia
- Years active: 2003–present
- Labels: Rainbow Quartz, Hook & Prayer Records
- Members: Trevor Anderson; Robbie MacArthur; Max Hebert; Charles Pham-Dang; Simon Quevillon
- Past members: Rishi Dhir; Robb Surridge; George Donoso III; Eric Dougherty; Shane Watt; Sheenah Ko

The High Dials are a Canadian indie rock band from Montreal, Quebec, Canada. The band started out playing a brand of pop music strongly influenced by 1960s British mod styles, but their sound has broadened to incorporate power pop, psychedelic music, shoegaze, and folk rock.

== History ==
The High Dials evolved out of an earlier three-piece band known as The Datsons. The Datsons released music on Union Label Group affiliate Tyrant Records in 2000 and Off the Hip Records in 2002 as The Datson Four. Confusion with New Zealand band The Datsuns and a new sound and line-up resulted in a name change following SXSW 2003.

The High Dials' debut album, A New Devotion, was released July 29, 2003, through NYC-based Rainbow Quartz Records. Described as a concept album about "a boy named Silas attempting to escape from a nightmarish city of the future", it reached the top ten of Canada's !earshot National Top 50 Chart. E Street Band guitarist and radio personality Little Steven Van Zandt played the album on his Sirius radio show, and later booked them to perform at his 2004 Underground Garage Festival on Randall's Island , which featured The Strokes, Stooges and New York Dolls. On November 4, 2023, Hook & Prayer Records re-issued a 20th-anniversary edition of this album, featuring remixes and restored tracks.

2004 saw the band release a follow-up EP, Fields In Glass, featuring album outtakes and electro remixes by Michael Musmanno, Davy Love and Will Carruthers. Exclaim! likened the sound to a mix of Chemical Brothers and Robert Pollard.

In 2005, the High Dials released their sophomore album, War of the Wakening Phantoms, which marked a departure from the overtly retro feel of their debut. Produced by Joseph Donovan and mixed by David Bianco, the songs featured lusher, more varied instrumentation and Sam Roberts as a guest violinist. The new direction in sound was generally well received by critics, with the album dubbed a "latter-day psychedelic classic" by NME. It reached the number one spot on Canadian college radio charts. The High Dials toured in support of the album, including support act slots for Brian Jonestown Massacre and Neko Case.

The album was followed by The Holy Ground EP in 2007, which featured a guest appearance by Rod Argent of The Zombies on keyboard.

The High Dials released the album Moon Country independently in 2008, before returning to Rainbow Quartz Records in 2010 for Anthems for Doomed Youth. The latter album enjoyed airplay from KROQ DJ Rodney Bingenheimer. Album track "Bedroom Shadows", featured in the SyFy series Being Human.

Notable High Dials' concerts in this period include supporting Echo & the Bunnymen at SXSW and the Osheaga Music Festival in Montreal, 2011. Later in 2011, they worked with original Rolling Stones manager Andrew Loog Oldham on a cover of "She Smiled Sweetly" for The Andrew Oldham Orchestra and Friends Play The Rolling Stones Songbook Vol. 2.

Following two teaser EPs – Yestergraves (2013) and Desert Tribe (2014) – the High Dials released In the A.M. Wilds on February 3, 2015, each co-produced by Marc Bell. The album marked another stage in the band's evolution with its post-punk influences and pulsing "electronic shimmer", though these sounds had previously been noted by critics on 2008's Moon Country. Album track "Echoes and Empty Rooms" featured in season four of the Netflix series House of Cards.

Following its release, the band toured Mexico and Colombia for the first time.

In November 2018, the band returned from hiatus with the Foreverish EP and video. The following year, they released a new album in two parts: Primitive Feelings, Parts I & II (combined together in vinyl format).

== Members ==
The High Dials have had a fluctuating line-up since 2003, centered on founding members Trevor Anderson and Robbie MacArthur. Band members have included drummer George Donoso III (ex–The Dears), keyboardist and backing vocalist Eric Dougherty, drummer Max Hebert, bassist/sitarist Rishi Dhir, and Robb Surridge (drums).

== Discography ==
=== EPs ===
- Fields in Glass EP (2004)
- The Holy Ground EP (2007)
- Yestergraves EP (2013)
- Desert Tribe EP (2014)
- Foreverish EP (2018)

=== Albums ===
- A New Devotion (2003)
- War of the Wakening Phantoms (2005)
- Moon Country (2008)
- Anthems for Doomed Youth (2010)
- In the A.M. Wilds (2015)
- Primitive Feelings, Pt. I (2019)
- Primitive Feelings, Pt. II (2019)

== See also ==
- Canadian rock
- List of bands from Canada
