= The Gate (Sam Roberts song) =

Single by Sam Roberts

from the album Chemical City
- Released: 2006
- Genre: Alternative rock
- Length: 5:57; 4:13 (radio edit)
- Label: Universal Music Canada
- Songwriter(s): Sam Roberts
- Producer(s): Joseph Donovan

Sam Roberts singles chronology
"Hard Road" (2003)	"The Gate" (2006)	"Bridge to Nowhere" (2006)

Music video
- "The Gate" on YouTube

"The Gate" is a song by Canadian musician Sam Roberts. The song was released as the lead single from Roberts' second studio album, Chemical City. The song was featured on the MuchMusic compilation album, Big Shiny Tunes 11.

== Commercial performance ==
"The Gate" reached No. 1 on Canada's Rock chart, and was the seventh-most played rock song in Canada in 2006.
