= Lo-Fantasy =

Studio album by Sam Roberts Band
- Released: February 11, 2014
- Studio: Mixart (Montreal)
- Genre: Alternative rock
- Length: 48:48
- Label: Paper Bag Records, Universal Music Canada
- Producer: Martin Glover

Sam Roberts Band chronology
Collider (2011)	Lo-Fantasy (2014)	Terraform (2016)

Singles from Lo-Fantasy
- 1. "We're All In This Together" Released: October 1, 2013; 2. "Human Heat" Released: 2014

Lo-Fantasy is the fifth studio album by Canadian rock musician Sam Roberts, and the second released as "Sam Roberts Band". The album debuted at number 3 on the Canadian Albums Chart, selling 5,800 copies during its first week. The album was nominated for "Rock Album of the Year" at the 2015 Juno Awards.

== Promotion ==
On September 16, 2014, Roberts announced a 16-city worldwide tour to promote the album, beginning at The Garage in London and finishing at Rogers K-Rock Centre in Kingston with fellow Canadian band Besnard Lakes as a supporting act.

== Critical reception ==
Professional ratings
Aggregate scores
Source	Rating
Metacritic	71/100
Review scores
Source	Rating
AllMusic	4/5 stars
Exclaim!	7/10
NOW	3/5 Ns
Slant Magazine	2/5 stars

Lo-Fantasy received generally favorable reviews but music critics were mixed on the uses from the electronic genre throughout the album. At Metacritic, which assigns a normalized rating out of 100 to reviews from mainstream critics, the album received an average score of 71, based on 4 reviews.

AllMusic writer Matt Collar called it "a melodic, psych-inflected album that showcases Roberts' knack for mixing gigantic, propulsive rock melodies and dance-oriented hooks", saying that its "at once organically rootsy and studio sophisticated, with songs that straddle the line between stadium shouters ("We're All in This Together") and midtempo club anthems ("The Hands of Love")." Matthew Riddle from Exclaim! commended the mixture of Roberts' "trademark arena-rock choruses and anthemic growls" through various dance genre filters. He said of Roberts' detractors: "those willing to get past their preconceived notions may be surprised to find that Lo-Fantasy is perhaps the most dynamic recording of Roberts' career." Joshua Kloke of NOW noted how the record utilizes a combination of the "wandering vibe" from Chemical City and the "jazzy feel" of Collider, saying that it can be "airy and middling" at times. He concluded that "Thankfully, though, Roberts is less concerned with sticking to a chunky, riff-driven formula than with experimenting with the many layers that he and his band are capable of producing." In a negative review for Slant Magazine, Kyle Fowle found the electronic elements "overbearing", with each track containing "stale production flourishes and gratuitous layers of reverb." He concluded that the record "attempts to skate by on pure surface appeal in order to distract from the obtuse social commentary at its core."

== Track listing ==
All tracks are written by Sam Roberts

No.	Title	Length
1.	"Shapeshifters"	4:28
2.	"We're All In This Together"	5:00
3.	"Human Heat"	3:43
4.	"Metal Skin"	5:18
5.	"Angola"	5:06
6.	"The Hands of Love"	4:03
7.	"Kid Icarus"	3:15
8.	"Too Far"	3:52
9.	"Never Enough"	3:58
10.	"Chasing the Light"	5:13
11.	"Golden Hour"	4:52

Disc two - bonus tracks
No.	Title	Length
1.	"We're All In This Together [Andrew Weatherall remix]"	7:01
2.	"The Hands of Love [Youth Banda remix]"	4:06
3.	"Shapeshifters [Youth Banda remix]"	5:39
4.	"Chasing the Light [Youth Banda remix]"	5:55
5.	"Counting the Days [Youth Banda remix]"	6:36
6.	"Golden Hour [Youth Banda remix]"	4:45
7.	"Metal Skin [Youth Banda remix]"	6:13
8.	"We're All In This Together [Youth Banda remix]"	5:21

== Personnel ==
Credits adapted from the liner notes of Lo-Fantasy.

Sam Roberts Band

- Sam Roberts - lead vocals, guitar
- James Hall - bass
- Eric Fares - keyboards, synthesizers
- Dave Nugent - guitar, backing vocals
- Josh Trager - drums

Additional musicians

- Chet Doxas - saxophone (on "We're All In This Together", "Never Enough", "Golden Hour")
- Tim Fletcher - backing vocals (on "We're All In This Together")

Artwork

- Simon Paul - art direction and design
- Jan Verburg - interior image design
