= I Feel You (disambiguation) =

"I Feel You" is a 1993 song by Depeche Mode, covered by Johnny Marr in 2015.

I Feel You may also refer to:

- "I Feel You", a 1992 song by Neil Diamond
- "I Feel You" (Peter Andre song), a 1996 song by Peter Andre
- "I Feel You" (Sam Roberts Band song), a 2011 song by the Sam Roberts Band
- "I Feel You", a 2002 song by 3 Doors Down from Away from the Sun
- "I Feel You", a 2015 song by the South Korean group Wonder Girls
- "I Feel You", a song by Natasha Bedingfield from Roll with Me, 2019
- "Leben… I Feel You", a 2003 song by Schiller
