= Belgrave (album) =

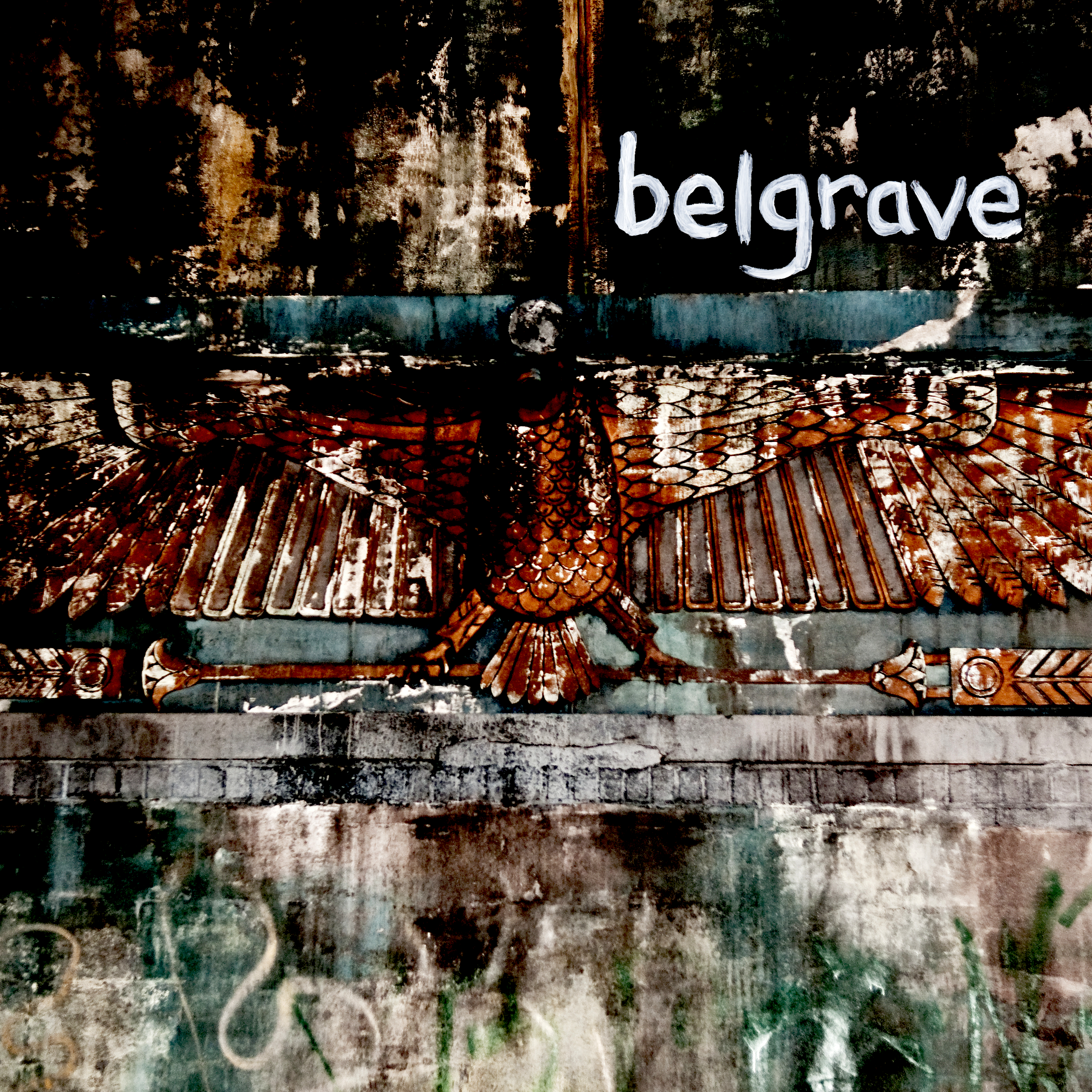

Studio album by Belgrave
- Released: May 27, 2011
- Recorded: 2010–2011 in Montreal
- Genre: Artistic pop
- Length: 23:07
- Label: Unsigned
- Producer: Joseph Donovan

Belgrave is the self-titled debut studio EP by Canadian artistic pop band Belgrave, released in May 2011.

== Background ==
The EP is a compilation of songs originally found on Belgrave's unreleased demo. The songs were written between 2009-2010 and submitted to producer Joseph Donovan. Donovan spent nearly six months dedicating much of his time perfecting Belgrave's sound. Subsequently, the EP's launch date had been delayed twice. February 11 at Montreal's La Sala Rossa and May 4 at O Patro Vys were original launch dates until the band and Donovan finally settled on May 27. The Montreal Gazette's review of Belgrave was positive. While CHOM 97.7 has featured the track Tokyo multiple times, many music blogs raved about the track Six Minutes.

== Track listing ==
All tracks are written by Belgrave.

No.	Title	Length
1.	"Distance"	3:57
2.	"Heart Strings"	2:47
3.	"Tokyo"	3:27
4.	"Perfect Hands"	3:47
5.	"Slow Down World"	3:43
6.	"Six Minutes"	5:07

== Personnel ==
Belgrave (music and arrangement):

- Trevor Boucher
- Liam Boucher
- Catherine Cere
- Michael Bufo
- Jonathan Powter

Other personnel:

- Pietro Amato – French horn (tracks 4 & 6)
- Joseph Donovan - Sounds (tracks 1 & 2)
- Emilie Marzinotto - Background vocals (track 6)

=== Technical personnel ===
- Joseph Donovan – recording
- Joseph Donovan – mixing
- Joseph Donovan and Adrian Popovich - engineering
- Rose Anne Darwent – artwork design
- Christopher Snow - Photography
