= Anthems for Doomed Youth (The High Dials album) =

Studio album by The High Dials
- Released: November 2, 2010
- Genre: Power pop, indie pop, dream pop
- Length: 39:33
- Label: Rainbow Quartz, Independent (Fontana North)
- Producer: Trevor Anderson

Anthems for Doomed Youth is the fourth studio album from Canadian indie pop act The High Dials, released on November 2, 2010, on the Rainbow Quartz label. The album's title makes reference to a poem by World War I poet Wilfred Owen. The album was self-recorded by the band in an abandoned naval building before being mixed by Michael Musmanno (Lilys) in New York City. The music has been likened to R.E.M., Echo and the Bunnymen and The Smiths. The song "Uruguay" features in the background of an episode of the Netflix series House of Cards (episode 28, season 2)

Professional ratings
Review scores
Source	Rating
AllMusic	4/5 stars
PopMatters	8/10 stars

== Track listing ==
No.	Title	Length
1.	"Teenage Love Made Me Insane"	2:44
2.	"I'm Over You (I Hope It's True)"	2:53
3.	"Uruguay"	3:54
4.	"I Was, You Were"	3:01
5.	"Chinese Boxes"	4:01
6.	"The Rich Die Too"	3:45
7.	"Mysterio"	5:28
8.	"What You Call Love Is A Lie"	4:42
9.	"Snowed In"	4:32
10.	"Bedroom Shadows"	4:38
