= Belgrave (name) =

Belgrave is both a surname and a given name. Notable people with the name include:

== Surname ==
- Barrington Belgrave (born 1980), English footballer
- Charles Belgrave (1894–1969), British adviser to the rulers of Bahrain (1926–1957)
- Elliott Belgrave (born 1931), Governor-General of Barbados and High Court Judge
- James Belgrave (1896–1918), British World War I flying ace
- John Belgrave (1940–2007), Chief Ombudsman of New Zealand (2003–2007)
- Marcus Belgrave (1936–2015), American jazz trumpet player
- Michael Belgrave, New Zealand historian and emeritus professor at Massey University
- Valerie Belgrave (1946–2016), Trinidadian artist and author

== Given name ==
- Belgrave Ninnis (1837–1922), Royal Navy surgeon and Arctic explorer
- Belgrave Edward Sutton Ninnis (1887–1912), Arctic explorer and member of 1911 Australasian Antarctic Expedition
