= Brother Down =

Single by Sam Roberts

from the album The Inhuman Condition & We Were Born in a Flame
- Released: 2002
- Genre: Indie rock, alternative rock
- Length: 4:25
- Label: MapleMusic Recordings
- Songwriter(s): Sam Roberts
- Producer(s): Jordon Zadorozny

Sam Roberts singles chronology
"Brother Down" (2002)	"Don't Walk Away Eileen" (2002)

"Brother Down" is the debut single by Canadian musician Sam Roberts. It was first featured on Roberts' demo recording Brother Down, and selected for his 2002 EP The Inhuman Condition. The song was a hit in Canada, reaching No. 2 in the country. The song also reached No. 3 on Canada's Nielsen rock airplay chart. It was one of the top 30 most played songs on Canadian radio in 2002. The song was later re-recorded for his debut album, We Were Born in a Flame. It was released as a single in the US in 2004.

Between 1995 and 2016, "Brother Down" was the third most played song by a Canadian artist on rock radio stations in Canada. It is his most-frequently played song live as of June 2024.

== In popular culture ==
"Brother Down" was featured in the animated MTV sitcom Undergrads. The song was also featured in the 2003 film S.W.A.T., and was included on the film's soundtrack.

== Awards and nominations ==
- 2003 – nominated for Single of the Year at the 2003 Juno Awards
- 2003 – won Best VideoFACT at the MuchMusic Video Awards
- 2003 – nominated for Best Pop Video and Best Independent Video at the MuchMusic Video Awards
