= Belgrave (band) =

Canadian artistic pop band

- Origin: Montreal, Quebec, Canada
- Genres: pop
- Years active: 2009–2016, 2026-present
- Members: Trevor Boucher; Liam Boucher; Michael Bufo; Jonathan Powter
- Past members: Catherine Cere

Belgrave is an artistic pop band from Montreal, Quebec, Canada. The band consists of Trevor Boucher on vocals, his brother Liam Boucher on keyboards, Michael Bufo on guitar, and Jonathan Powter on drums.

== History ==
The band was formed in September 2009 under the name Coral Red. In March of that year, the Sam Roberts Band and Coral Red performed at a private event together. During their performance, the band drew the attention of producer Joseph Donovan who invited them to support his band Receivers in May of that same year. The reviews were positive and Donovan arranged to produce the band that summer. Following their performance with Scotland's We Were Promised Jetpacks, the band changed their name to Belgrave on August 26, 2010. After six months in studio Belgrave emerged with a six-song self-titled EP in May 2011. The EP drew the attention of New York's Paper Garden Records earning them a spot in their Lovely Hearts Club and an invitation to New York's CMJ Music Marathon. Belgrave released a new single "Fake Futures" on May 27, 2026.

== Influence ==
Two of the band members (Trevor Boucher, Liam Boucher) are first cousins of Montreal French Horn player Pietro Amato, who was well-known in the Montreal music scene. His music had a strong influence on Belgrave's EP.

== Discography ==
- Belgrave (2011 self-titled EP)

== Videos ==
Six Minutes music video is from their debut EP Belgrave and was recorded at the same location where they performed with Sam Roberts Band at the 'Eric Maclean Centre for the Performing Arts'.

== Notable Appearances ==
- Radio play and interviews on Montreal's CHOM-FM.
- Performed alongside Sam Roberts Band in March 2010.
- Multiple performances at both Pop Montreal Festival and Toronto's Canadian Music Week.
- Showcased at New Yorks's CMJ Music Marathon in 2011.

== See also ==
- Belgrave on Facebook
- Belgrave on YouTube
