= Bridge to Nowhere (song) =

"Bridge To Nowhere"

Single by Sam Roberts

from the album Chemical City
- Released: 2006
- Genre: Alternative rock, folk rock
- Length: 3:09
- Label: Universal Music Canada
- Songwriter(s): Sam Roberts
- Producer(s): Joseph Donovan

Sam Roberts singles chronology
"The Gate" (2006)	"Bridge To Nowhere" (2006)	"With A Bullet" (2006)

"Bridge to Nowhere" is a rock song by Canadian musician Sam Roberts. It is the second single from Sam Roberts' second album Chemical City.

== Composition ==
The song has a fast tempo and is in a 6/4 musical meter. The song features acoustic guitar, electric guitar, electric piano, and tambourine giving it a folk rock sound. Its lyrics describe a troubled man dealing with everyday life, and its video depicts similar themes.

== Music video ==
The video itself is shot solely in black and white and relies on computer animation for its setting. The video begins with Roberts waking up in bed with a woman (who would appear to be his wife) and then following his venture to work as he ponders the workings of life. He sees police cars pass him as he walks to the train station, and sees them once more where an accident seems to have happened. He gets onto a futuristic locomotive which takes him to the downtown of the "Chemical City" where he goes to work in the biggest tower. He takes a long elevator ride up, looking at the people below him walking on their own paths as well. He listens to the company's boss (a woman partially hidden in shadows) until he leaves work and goes home to bed. He awakes once more and follows the same schedule to and from work, until his departure from work the second time, when the song quickens, and then slows down suddenly, and a flash of light hits and the city is gone, leaving a beautiful valley which most likely stood there before the city's construction.

== Awards ==
- 2007 - Won a Juno Award for Video of the Year.
