= Belgrave Trust =

US Carbon offset social enterprise

- Company type: Private
- Website type: E-commerce
- Available in: English
- Headquarters: New York City, {{{location_country}}}
- Founders: Nick Baily; Jeffrey A. Stewart
- Key people: Peter C. Fusaro; Jason Calacanis; Neil Capel; Craig Kanarick
- Industry: E-commerce; Green enterprise Social enterprise
- Products: Eco friendly products Carbon offset subscriptions Carbon offset gifts
- Website: www.belgravetrust.com
- Launched: November 2009
- Current status: Inactive

Belgrave Trust was a social enterprise firm that sold carbon offsets. It claimed that revenues derived through subscribers and the sale of products were used to offset greenhouse gases through the purchase and retirement of carbon offset securities that fund projects creating clean energy or reducing emissions.

== Products and services ==
The firm offered three main areas of service:

- Environmentally conscious products: A line of products created with environmentally conscious practices, each bundled with a carbon offset component that addressed a specific area of a home, office, or lifestyle
- Carbon neutral membership service: A subscription-based service that calculated an across-the-board total estimate of the carbon footprint of an individual or household and enables support of an equivalent amount of emissions reduction through the support of a portfolio of offset projects.
- Corporate sustainability services: Through parent company Belgrave Climate Exchange, Inc. the firm offered a suite of analytic and assessment services for businesses working on CSR initiatives.

== Timeline and organization ==
Belgrave Trust was founded by Nick Baily and Jeffrey A. Stewart and launched to the general public in November 2009. The company was based in New York City.

The firm's website debuted in March 2009 as an invitation-only alpha, launched a public beta on November 5, 2009, and exited beta on January 20, 2010. The firm was co-founded by entertainment executive (and Huffington Post commentator) Nicholas Baily, and serial entrepreneur and longtime New York tech community participant Jeffrey A. Stewart.

Other supporters and staff included green trading expert Peter Fusaro; former CTO of aSmallWorld Neil Capel; serial entrepreneur and pundit Jason Calacanis; original digital media icon and Razorfish founder Craig Kanarick; and Erik Dochtermann, CEO of luxury advertising and marketing firm KD&E.

The firm announced a line of environmentally conscious physical products and launched a new store in November 2010.

== Launch of products and attention for Apple initiative ==
In the fall of 2010, the firm made its first foray into selling physical products through a limited edition line, created in partnership with New York–based artist and designer Jason Douglas Griffin. Coinciding with a ground-up rebranding and a relaunch of their main site the line's approach was to "pair carbon neutrality with sustainable design" and the firm cited the initiative as a means to raise awareness of climate change solutions and broaden the market for support of carbon mitigating products.

The launch was met with favorable press attention from environmental outlets such as TreeHugger and Discovery Channel as well as design based media such as GOOD magazine and "new ideas" and tech outlets such as PSFK and TechCrunch.

One item in specific, however, landed the company in the spotlight. The Laptop Neutral sticker, designed to offset the emissions for Apple's popular line of aluminum-bodied notebook computers, crossed over from niche attention and became one of 2010's notable climate change stories when it was picked up by Time magazine. Time's climate change reporter Bryan Walsh penned a story entitled "Why Your Mac May Not Be as Clean As You Think". In the story, Walsh notes that "manufacturing aluminum is extremely energy-intensive, and as laptops shift from plastic casing to aluminum, their carbon footprints expand", citing Belgrave Trust's research and comments from Mr. Baily:

The Belgrave Trust, a New York-based social enterprise that calculates carbon footprints and offers carbon offsets, estimates that aluminum-cased laptops like MacBook Air can cause 42% more greenhouse gas emissions in their manufacture than identical plastic-cased versions. In fact, Belgrave estimates that if Apple sells 10 million aluminum-cased items as expected this holiday season, the company would have a bigger carbon footprint from those products alone than a major airline like British Airways or Air France. "It's a lot more energy-intensive than you imagine," says Nick Baily, Belgrave Trust's founder. "The emissions really add up over time. People don't realize that computers are responsible for around 5% of the world's carbon emissions."

== Offsets for the affluent ==
The company drew attention for choosing to focus on the affluent as its primary audience.

During the firm's invitation-only beta period, it participated in partnerships with firms such as Cirrus Aviation and Aston Martin. Belgrave Trust first received press attention from luxury and wealth oriented media, including Luxist.com, JustLuxe, and Lussorian, and received much of its coverage from consumer product and financial themed media, also including Crain's New York Business and Inc.

The company may have been the first to coin the term "luxury carbon" in the context of a consumer product or service.

The firm has acknowledged that catering to the wealthy may be controversial but countered by alleging that the wealthy bear a disproportionate share of the blame for climate change and that a service targeting the affluent specifically is a necessity. Founder and CEO Nick Baily, in a speech at the Wall Street Green Trading Summit in 2008, spoke directly to both sides of this point, stating: "So why go straight to the affluent? Because it's precisely those who have had the most impact that have the means to create a solution." This line of reasoning was common in press interviews with Baily and Stewart, with Baily telling financial news anchor Maria Bartiromo in a televised NBC interview: "The top seven percent of the world's affluent are responsible for half of its carbon footprint. If you're not addressing that, you're missing the point."

Belgrave Trust's approach was also discussed and covered in the environmental community. Mainstream environmental news outlets expressed support, though often acknowledging the likely negative feelings towards the wealthy. For example, TreeHugger said, "The dirty, stinking rich! Yeah, I said it! They are always getting called out for their imbalanced percentage of environmental destruction", though they follow with: "Love it or hate it, the mega-rich hold the key for a game changer with carbon emissions." Other environmental commentators, such as Corporate Sustainability Wire, have been more unequivocal in their praise.

== See also ==
- Carbon offsets
- Emissions trading
- Mitigation of global warming
