= Collider (Sam Roberts album) =

Studio album by Sam Roberts
- Released: May 10, 2011
- Recorded: 2010
- Studio: Engine Studios, Chicago, Illinois
- Genre: Rock
- Length: 55:27
- Label: Universal Music Canada; Zoë/Rounder Records
- Producer: Brian Deck

Sam Roberts chronology
Love at the End of the World (2008)	Collider (2011)	Lo-Fantasy (2014)

Professional ratings
Aggregate scores
Source	Rating
Metacritic	74/100
Review scores
Source	Rating
AllMusic	3.5/5 stars
American Songwriter	4/5 stars
ChartAttack	3.5/5 stars
NOW	3/5 Ns

Collider is the fourth studio album from Canadian rock musician Sam Roberts, released on May 10, 2011. It is the first album released under the moniker "Sam Roberts Band" instead of "Sam Roberts". Collider features several guest musicians, including Elizabeth Powell (of fellow Montreal band Land of Talk) on "Longitude", percussionist Ben Massarella (of Califone), and woodwind player Stuart D. Bogie (of Antibalas). The album cover art is an altered take on the standard model of the Theory of Everything (TOE)

The first Canadian single, "I Feel You", was released to Canadian radio on February 28, 2011, and made commercially available via iTunes Canada on March 8, 2011. An edited version of the song was made available for free online listening. Its video debuted on MuchMusic May 21. The first American single, "The Last Crusade", was made available for listening online on March 21, 2011. "Without A Map" was released as the second official single in August, with its video released in November.

The album was nominated for Rock Album of the Year at the 2012 Juno Awards.

== Commercial performance ==
The album debuted at No. 3 on the Canadian Albums Chart, with first week sales of 7,000 copies.

== Track listing ==
No.	Title	Length
1.	"The Last Crusade"	4:17
2.	"Without a Map"	4:05
3.	"Let It In"	4:17
4.	"Graveyard Shift"	4:27
5.	"No Arrows"	4:24
6.	"Longitude"	3:18
7.	"Streets of Heaven (Promises, Promises)"	4:26
8.	"Sang Froid"	3:30
9.	"Twist the Knife"	4:13
10.	"I Feel You"	5:16
11.	"The Band vs. The World"	4:09
12.	"Partition Blues"	4:10
13.	"Tractor Beam Blues"	4:55
Total length:		55:27

The pre-ordered iTunes release also features a digital booklet and a bonus fourteenth track, "Pretty Ugly".
