= Chet Doxas =

American musician and composer

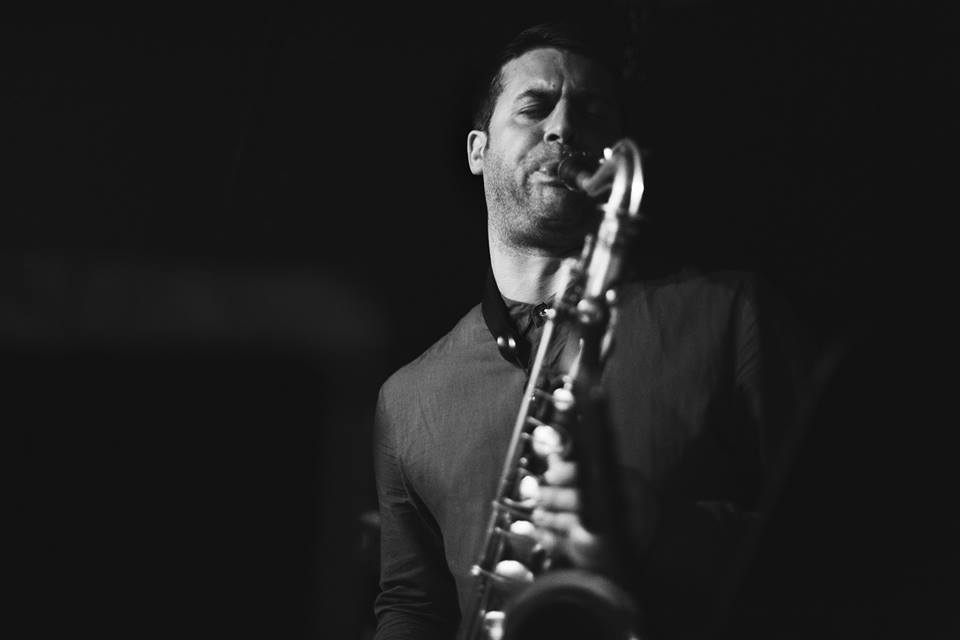
Chet Doxas performing - photo by Evan Shay

Chet Doxas is a saxophonist, clarinetist and composer based in Brooklyn, New York. His work has been nominated for numerous Juno, Grammy and Academy Awards. Doxas has released a number of albums as a leader and has received accolades for his work as a performer, composer and arranger. His work can be heard on over one hundred recordings.

== Early life ==
Born in 1980 and raised in Montreal, Canada into a musical family, Chet Doxas' love of music was fostered by his father, a musician, music teacher and recording engineer; and his older brother and drummer, Jim, with whom he regularly performs. He started performing and recording professionally while in his teenage years during what some would call the end of the good old days of Montreal - dance bands, burlesque reviews, radio shows, recordings, and night club work.

During this time he developed an interest in composition and began leading his own groups. He enrolled in McGill University and completed his undergraduate and graduate degrees in Jazz Performance, an institution where he later taught private lessons and ensembles. Now based in Brooklyn, NY since 2014, Chet leads and co-leads several projects including The Chet Doxas Trio, Doxas Brothers Quartet, Landline, Rich in Symbols, Larum, and the Ceremonial Sextet. He was recently appointed the first tenor saxophone chair in the Canadian National Jazz Orchestra. Since his move to New York City, he has had the opportunity to perform alongside or record with: Carla Bley, Steve Swallow, Dave Douglas, John Abercrombie, Michael Formanek and several other luminaries of the creative music scene.

Chet has led and co-led the release of fourteen albums and is a multiple Juno Award nominee who's playing was also featured on the Grammy and Academy Award nominated soundtrack, Les Triplettes de Belleville. In 2019 he was awarded SOCAN's Haygood Hardy Award and most recently, he was named in the 2022 & 2023 Downbeat Magazine Rising Star Critic's Poll in the categories for Tenor Saxophone, Soprano Saxophone and Clarinet.

== Life and career ==
Doxas was born to parents who were teachers. In his youth, he was in a swing jazz ensemble which performed around Montreal. He later attended McGill University, where he would perform his music. In 2014, Doxas moved to New York City to further his career.

After recording Big Sky and Dive (which he recorded before moving to New York), Doxas's album Rich in Symbols was nominated for a Juno award for Best Jazz solo album of 2018. The album, which conveys a rock-world approach to jazz, features guitar work on select tracks by Dave Nugent. Doxas has also been a member of the Sam Roberts Band where he would play the woodwind instrument.

== Discography ==
=== As leader/co-leader ===
Release year	Title	Label	Personnel/Notes
2023	Kindred	Justin Time Records	Chet Doxas - saxophones & compositions, Marc Copland - piano & compositions, Adrian Vedady - bass & compositions, Jim Doxas - drums & compositions
2022	Rich in Symbols II	Justin Time Records	Chet Doxas - woodwinds & compositions, Jacob Sacks - piano & mellotron. Joe Grass - pedal steel & guitar, Zack Lober - bass, Eric Doob - drums and electronics. Special guests: Sam Roberts - spoken word, Evan Shay - drum programming
2022	The Music of Hildegard von Bingen Part 1	Puremagnetik	LARUM - Micah Frank - electronics & compositions, Chet Doxas - woodwinds, electronics & compositions
2021	You Can't Take it With You	Whirlwind Recordings	Chet Doxas - saxophones & compositions, Ethan Iverson - piano, Thomas Morgan - bass
2020	The Circle	Justin Time Records	Chet Doxas - saxophones & compositions, Marc Copland - piano, Adrian Vedady - bass & compositions, Jim Doxas - drums & compositions
2019	All the Roads	Foil Imprints	LARUM - Micah Frank - electronics & compositions, Chet Doxas - woodwinds, electronics & compositions
2019	Landline	Loyal Label	Chet Doxas - saxophones & compositions, Jacob Sacks - piano & compositions, Zack Lober - bass & compositions, Vinnie Sperrazza - drums & compositions
2017	Rich in Symbols	Ropeadope Records	Chet Doxas - woodwinds & compositions, Matthew Stevens - guitar, Zack Lober - bass, Eric Doob - drums and electronics. Special Guests: Dave Douglas - trumpet, Dave Nugent - guitar,
2017	The New National Anthem	Greenleaf	Chet Doxas - woodwinds & compositions, Dave Douglas - trumpet, Steve Swallow - bass, Jim Doxas - Drums
2014	Riverside	Greenleaf	Chet Doxas - woodwinds & compositions, Dave Douglas - trumpet, Steve Swallow - bass, Jim Doxas - Drums
2013	Relative Quartet	Addo Records	Chet Doxas - saxophones, John Stetch - piano, Michael Bates - bass, Owen Howard - drums
2013	Dive	Addo Records	Chet Doxas - saxophone, Matthew Stevens - guitar, Zack Lober - bass, Eric Doob - drums
2010	Big Sky	Justin Time Records	Chet Doxas - saxophones, Benoît Charest - guitar, Zack Lober - bass, Jim Doxas -drums
2008	Le Mur	Fusion III	ByProduct: Chet Doxas - saxophones, Zack Lober - bass, Jim Doxas - drums. String Quartet: Stéphane Allard, Zoe Dumais, Jean Rene, Shelagh Hannigan Conducted by: John Sadowy
2006	Sidewalk Etiquette	Justin Time Records	Chet Doxas - saxophones, John Roney - piano, Zack Lober - bass, Jim Doxas -drums
2003	ByProduct	Fusion III	ByProduct: Chet Doxas - saxophones, Zack Lober - bass, Jim Doxas - drums
