= Them Kids =

Single by Sam Roberts

from the album Love at the End of the World
- Released: 2008
- Genre: Alternative rock
- Length: 3:59
- Label: Secret Brain, Universal Music Canada
- Songwriter(s): Sam Roberts

Sam Roberts singles chronology
"With a Bullet" (2006)	"Them Kids" (2008)	"Detroit '67" (2008)

"Them Kids" is a song by Canadian musician Sam Roberts. It was released as the lead single from his third studio album, Love at the End of the World. The song was released through iTunes on March 4, 2008. The song was a success in Canada, reaching #1 on Canada's Rock chart and peaking at #36 on the Canadian Hot 100. "Them Kids" was the fifth-most played rock song in Canada of 2008.

== Music video ==
The music video for "Them Kids" was directed by Dave Pawsey and debuted on April 22, 2008. The video is a parody of The Sims.

=== Awards and nominations ===
The music video was nominated for "Video of the Year" at the 2009 Juno Awards. It was also nominated for Best Post-Production and Best Director at the 2008 MuchMusic Video Awards, winning for Best Post-Production.

== Charts ==
Chart (2008)	Peak position
Canada (Canadian Hot 100)	36
Canada Rock (Billboard)	1
US Adult Alternative Songs (Billboard)	25
