= The Inhuman Condition =

EP by Sam Roberts
- Released: July 16, 2002
- Recorded: 2001 Pembroke, Ontario
- Genre: Rock, indie rock
- Length: 22:59
- Label: MapleMusic Recordings
- Producer: Jordon Zadorozny

Sam Roberts chronology
The Inhuman Condition (2002)	We Were Born in a Flame (2003)

Professional ratings
Review scores
Source	Rating
Allmusic	4/5 stars

The Inhuman Condition is the first solo studio release by Canadian musician Sam Roberts, released in 2002. The tracks featured reworked versions of his demo "Brother Down" together with producer and percussionist Jordon Zadorozny. The EP peaked at #32 on the Canadian album chart after just nine weeks of being released. This is due mainly to the success of the first single, "Brother Down". The follow-up single, "Don't Walk Away Eileen", further increased the popularity of the EP in the winter of 2002-2003. The album has sold over 50,000 copies and has been certified Gold in Canada. Pitchfork described the EP as "a sturdy, respectable and, intermittently, even thrilling first effort from an artist who has much to say". In 2013 the EP was re-released on vinyl through Paper Bag Records.

== Track listing ==
All tracks are written by Sam Roberts.

No.	Title	Length
1.	"Don't Walk Away Eileen"	3:13
2.	"Brother Down"	4:25
3.	"Where Have All the Good People Gone?"	6:15
4.	"When Everything Was Alright"	3:36
5.	"My Love Is Freeing"	2:53
6.	"This Is How I Live"	2:42

== Personnel ==
- Sam Roberts - Guitar, bass, keyboards, and vocals
- Jordon Zadorozny - Drums, producer, and additional bass and percussion
