= Valerie Belgrave =

Trinidadian artist, author and composer (1946–2016)

- Born: 3 March 1946; Petit Bourg, San Juan, Trinidad
- Died: 23 August 2016 (aged 70); Trinidad
- Education: Sir George Williams University (BA)
- Occupations: Artist; author
- Notable work: Ti Marie (1988)
- Spouse: Ian "Teddy" Belgrave (d. 2013)
- Children: 1 son

Valerie Belgrave (3 March 1946 – 23 August 2016) was a Trinidadian artist and author, who also composed music.

== Biography ==
Valerie Belgrave was born and raised in Petit Bourg, San Juan, Trinidad. She attended St Joseph’s Convent, San Fernando, and continued her education at Sir George Williams University (now Concordia), in Canada, where she obtained a BA degree in painting and literature. She took part in the 1969 sit-in staged by hundreds of students at the computer lab on the ninth floor of the university in protest against a professor who was accused of racism; the incident, which became the subject of a documentary called The Ninth Floor, is believed to have helped spark the 1970 Black Power Revolution in Trinidad.

Belgrave's writings included the novels Ti Marie (published in 1988, and described as "a Caribbean Gone with the Wind) and Dance the Water (2002), a play entitled Night of the Wolf (1991), and the 2007 children's book Adventures of the Magic Steelpan, as well as a photo memoir called Art for the People, launched in 2011. She was also a painter and batik designer.

== Personal life ==
She was married to Ian "Teddy" Belgrave (who died in July 2013), and had one son, Chenier Belgrave, who is a designer.
