= Love at the End of the World =

Studio album by Sam Roberts
- Released: May 20, 2008
- Studio: Mountain City Recording Studios, Montreal, Quebec
- Genre: Rock
- Length: 54:29
- Label: Secret Brain, Universal Music Canada
- Producer: Joseph Donovan

Sam Roberts chronology
Chemical City (2006)	Love at the End of the World (2008)	Collider (2011)

Professional ratings
Review scores
Source	Rating
Allmusic	4/5 stars
CHARTattack	3.5/5 stars

Love at the End of the World is the third full-length album from Canadian rock musician Sam Roberts. The album was first released in Canada on May 20, 2008, in the Netherlands on September 19, in the UK on October 13, and in the US on February 3, 2009. Love at the End of the World debuted at #1 on the Canadian Albums Chart, selling 9,000 copies in its first week. The album was certified Gold in Canada in November 2008. It won the 2009 Juno Award for Rock Album of the Year.

The album cover is based on an illustration by Elisabeth Moch.

== Singles ==
"Them Kids" was the first single released, originally through iTunes on March 4. The music video debuted on April 22. On the week of August 14, "Them Kids" reached No. 1 on the Canadian indie chart, the R3-30. The second single was "Detroit '67".

== Reception ==
The album received positive reviews from Allmusic and CHARTattack, with a mixed review in Popmatters.

== Track listing ==
No.	Title	Length
1.	"Love at the End of the World"	2:36
2.	"Stripmall Religion"	4:02
3.	"Oh Maria"	3:46
4.	"Lions of the Kalahari"	4:11
5.	"Fixed to Ruin"	3:45
6.	"Them Kids"	3:59
7.	"Words and Fire"	3:53
8.	"Sundance"	4:18
9.	"Up Sister"	3:40
10.	"End of the Empire"	4:18
11.	"The Pilgrim"	5:31
12.	"Waking the Dead"	6:26
13.	"Detroit '67"	4:02

=== iTunes Bonus Tracks ===
The following tracks were available with the iTunes pre-order of the album.

14. "Them Kids [K-OS Remix]" - 3:31
