= MuchFACT =

Canadian fund

- Formation: August 31, 1984; 42 years ago
- Founder: Moses Znaimer; Bernie Finkelstein
- Dissolved: September 26, 2017; 9 years ago
- Type: Foundation
- Purpose: Funding Canadian music videos
- Headquarters: Toronto, Ontario, Canada
- Official language: English, French
- Main organ: Much
- Parent organization: Bell Media
- Website: web.archive.org/web/20170831193227/http://www.muchfact.ca/
- Formerly called: VideoFACT

MuchFACT was a Canadian fund that provided grants to Canadian recording artists to help them produce music videos. FACT stands for Foundation To Assist Canadian Talent. MuchFACT was funded entirely by television cable channel Much (formerly MuchMusic) who committed a percentage of their gross annual revenues to the fund. It was previously funded by M3 (formerly MuchMore) but stopped after the channel was relaunched as Gusto.

== History ==
VideoFACT (as it was originally known) was created in 1984 with the launch of MuchMusic as a condition of its licence applied by the Canadian Radio-television and Telecommunications Commission (CRTC). Two years later with the launch of MusiquePlus, it also became a sponsor, as did MuchMoreMusic when it launched in 1998.

Along with the launch of MuchMoreMusic in 1998, a new fund in conjunction with VideoFACT was created called PromoFACT, to help assist in the creation of Electronic Press Kits (EPK) and website productions for Canadian artists, independent record labels and artist management companies. PromoFACT is funded exclusively by MuchMoreMusic.

Many of Canada's most influential recording artists received VideoFACT funding for their early recordings, including Sam Roberts, K-os, Céline Dion, k.d. lang, Matthew Good, The Pursuit of Happiness, Bran Van 3000, Lara Fabian, Blue Rodeo, Rascalz, Sloan, Jean Leloup, Great Big Sea, Sarah McLachlan, Death From Above 1979, Carly Rae Jepsen, Dubmatique, Aspektz and Ashley MacIsaac among others.

The approach of monetary distribution used by VideoFACT and non-associated Canadian record funding organization (FACTOR) is not without critics. In 2008, the federally commissioned Wicks Report, instigated by then Prime Minister Stephen Harper, investigated VideoFACT and its granting apparatus. Chaired by the now defunct Burlington based melodic aggressive punk band The Tirekickers, the Wicks Report identified systemic bias against several specific musical genres, including hip-hop, trip-hop, and melodic aggressive punk rock. The Wicks Report's 28 recommendations have yet to be implemented by the federal government.

In 2009, the organizations came under public scrutiny when a letter written by Unfamiliar Records founder Greg Ipp was republished on the internet - in turn promoting the idea that bigger image-based bands shouldn’t be getting such a huge amount of those finite funds as it leaves relatively little, if any, funding for the smaller up-and-coming bands. MuchFACT's executive director publicly disagreed with Ipp however, and went on record to clarify that the foundation's mandate was to support both new and existing talent.

In 2009, MusiquePlus discontinued its funding of VideoFACT, instead to focus funding on a similar French-language fund, MaxFACT. In September 2009, VideoFACT was later renamed MuchFACT.

In May 2017, the CRTC dropped the requirement for Bell Media to continue funding the program. MuchFACT was discontinued on September 26, 2017.

== See also ==
- BravoFACT
