= Where Have All the Good People Gone? =

Single by Sam Roberts

from the album The Inhuman Condition & We Were Born in a Flame
- Released: 2003
- Genre: Alternative rock
- Length: 6:15 (The Inhuman Condition version); 4:22
- Label: Universal Music Canada
- Songwriter(s): Sam Roberts
- Producer(s): Brenndan McGuire

Sam Roberts singles chronology
"Don't Walk Away Eileen" (2002)	"Where Have All the Good People Gone?" (2003)	"Hard Road" (2003)

"Where Have All the Good People Gone?" is a song by Canadian musician Sam Roberts. The song was originally released in 2002 on Roberts' EP The Inhuman Condition. The song was re-recorded and released as the lead single from his major label debut album, We Were Born in a Flame. The song is also featured on the MuchMusic compilation album, Big Shiny Tunes 8.

== Commercial performance ==
The song reached No. 29 on Canada's Singles chart. The single was certified Gold by the CRIA in May 2003. Between 1995 and 2016, "Where Have All the Good People Gone?" was the 12th most played song by a Canadian artist on rock radio stations in Canada.
