= We Were Born in a Flame =

- International edition cover

Studio album by Sam Roberts
- Released: June 3, 2003 (CAN); June 17, 2003 (US)
- Recorded: 2003
- Studio: Mushroom Studios, Vancouver
- Genre: Rock, roots rock, alternative rock
- Length: 57:38
- Label: Universal Music Canada
- Producer: Brenndan McGuire

Sam Roberts chronology
The Inhuman Condition (2002)	We Were Born in a Flame (2003)	Chemical City (2006)

Alternative cover
- American edition cover

Singles from We Were Born in a Flame
- 1. "Where Have All the Good People Gone?" Released: 2003; 2. "Hard Road" Released: January, 2003; 3. "Dead End" Released: 2003; 4. "Every Part of Me" Released: 2003

Professional ratings
Review scores
Source	Rating
AllMusic	4.5/5 stars

We Were Born in a Flame is the debut full-length studio album by Canadian rock musician and singer/songwriter Sam Roberts. A re-recorded version of "Where Have All the Good People Gone?" was released as the album's first single in Canada and had a music video made for it. "Hard Road" was also released as a single with a music video in Canada. The songs "Brother Down" and "Don't Walk Away Eileen" had been previously released as radio/video singles in Canada to promote Roberts' previous EP, The Inhuman Condition. "Brother Down" was also re-recorded for this album. In the United States, "Brother Down" was used to promote the album, while in the United Kingdom, "Don't Walk Away Eileen" was used.

Earlier versions of "Brother Down", "Taj Mahal", "The Canadian Dream", "On The Run", "Climb Over Me", and "Paranoia" all previously appeared on Roberts' 2000 independently released Brother Down.

The album won two Juno Awards in 2004: Album of the Year and Rock Album Of The Year. Roberts also won the Juno award for Artist of the Year.

== Commercial performance ==
We Were Born in a Flame debuted at No. 2 on the Canadian Albums Chart. By April 2006, the album had sold 145,000 units in Canada. The album was certified Double Platinum in Canada on May 14. 2018.

== Track listing ==
All songs written by Sam Roberts.

No.	Title	Length
1.	"Hard Road"	4:06
2.	"Where Have All the Good People Gone?"	4:22
3.	"Brother Down"	4:24
4.	"Higher Learning"	4:06
5.	"Dead End"	3:38
6.	"Taj Mahal"	4:30
7.	"Every Part of Me"	3:45
8.	"The Canadian Dream"	4:58
9.	"Rarefied"	3:39
10.	"On the Run"	2:19
11.	"Don't Walk Away Eileen"	3:13
12.	"No Sleep"	4:02
13.	"This Wreck of a Life"	4:54
14.	"Paranoia"	5:49

== Personnel ==
- Sam Roberts - Vocals and all instruments (except drums)
- George Donoso - Drums on all tracks (except "Don't Walk Away Eileen")
- Jordan Zadorozny - Drums on "Don't Walk Away Eileen"
- Corey Zadorozny - Additional Percussion
- Eric Fares - Additional keyboard
- James Hall - Additional guitar
- Dave Nugent - Backing vocals
