= Chemical City =

Studio album by Sam Roberts
- Released: April 11, 2006
- Recorded: 2004–2005
- Studios: The Old Church, Newrybar, New South Wales; Stock Market Audio, Montreal, Quebec
- Genres: Rock, roots rock
- Length: 47:56
- Label: Universal Music Canada
- Producer: Joseph Donovan

Sam Roberts chronology
| We Were Born in a Flame (2003) | Chemical City (2006) | Love at the End of the World (2008) |

Chemical City is the second studio album by Canadian musician Sam Roberts, released in Canada on April 11, 2006, and in the United States on May 16, 2006. The album debuted at number three on the Canadian Albums Chart, selling 10,000 units in its first week. The album was certified Platinum in Canada on May 17, 2018. The album had three singles: "The Gate", "Bridge To Nowhere", and "With a Bullet".

== Critical reception ==
Professional ratings
Review scores
| Source | Rating |
|---|---|
| AllMusic | 4/5 stars |
| Chart Attack | 4/5 stars |
| Jam! | 3.5/5 stars |
| Pitchfork | 6.7/10 |

Jo-Ann Greene of AllMusic praised the album for capturing '70s classic rock in terms of packaging and tracks that are reminiscent of New Model Army, the Rolling Stones and Small Faces, calling it "a sumptuous helping of songs with strong melodies and anthemic choruses vying with more subtle, shaded pieces, all filled with meaty lyrics that are easily the equal of the music." Cory D. Byron of Pitchfork also commended Roberts for his stripped down singer-songwriter take on classic rock but was more favorable to the record's upbeat tracks than its slower-paced ones, concluding that, "Ultimately the ballads do more to weigh it down than lift it up, but Chemical City still has plenty to offer fans of old-fashioned rock."

== Track listing ==
All songs written by Sam Roberts.

| No. | Title | Length |
|---|---|---|
| 1. | "The Gate" | 5:57 |
| 2. | "Bridge to Nowhere" | 3:09 |
| 3. | "With a Bullet" | 4:00 |
| 4. | "Mind Flood" | 8:09 |
| 5. | "Uprising Down Under" | 4:35 |
| 6. | "Mystified, Heavy" | 4:50 |
| 7. | "An American Draft Dodger in Thunder Bay" | 3:13 |
| 8. | "The Bootleg Saint" | 4:08 |
| 9. | "The Resistance" | 5:13 |
| 10. | "A Stone Would Cry Out" | 4:36 |

2021 Re-release

| No. | Title | Length |
|---|---|---|
| 11. | "Fall Before You Finish" | 4:30 |
| 12. | "Major Minor" | 5:02 |
| 13. | "The Cathedral" | 7:03 |
| 14. | "Step Inside" | 5:54 |

== Personnel ==
Adapted from the booklet of Chemical City.

Musicians

- Sam Roberts - Vocals, guitars, keyboards, strings, co-producer
- Dave Nugent - Guitars, backing vocals
- Eric Fares - Keyboards, backing vocals, acoustic guitar
- James Hall - Bass
- Josh Tragger - Drums, percussion on tracks 1, 2, 3, 5, 6, 8, and 9
- Bill Anthopoulos - Drums, percussion on tracks 4 and 7
- Matt Mays - Vocals, guitar on track 5
- Danielle Duval - Vocals on tracks 8 and 9
- George "El Condor" Donoso - Additional drums on track 4

Technical staff

- Joseph Donovan - Producer, co-producer, engineer
- Mark Howard - Co-producer, engineer
- Don Murnaghan - Studio assistant
- Garnet Armstrong - Art director, design
- Susan Michalek - Design
- Ken Dewar - Illustrations
- David Gillespie - Photography
- Dave Spencer - Manager
- Patrick Sambrook - Co-manager

== Certifications ==
| Region | Certification | Certified units/sales |
|---|---|---|
| Canada (Music Canada) | Platinum | 100,000^{‡} |
^{‡} Sales+streaming figures based on certification alone.
