= Joseph Donovan (producer) =

- Occupation(s): Music producer, engineer, and musician

Joseph Donovan is a music producer, engineer, and musician. His credits include the Juno Award winning album Love at the End of the World by Sam Roberts and albums by The High Dials, and The Dears. He is currently guitarist with the Montreal band Receivers, an offshoot of his now defunct band Marlowe (1996–2005).

== Early career ==
In 1996 songwriters Joseph Donovan and Alex Olsen's careers came to fruition upon forming the band Marlowe. Marlowe consisted of Donovan on Guitar, Olsen on vocals and keyboard, Jason Thomas, George Donoso and Eric Fares. The band received positive reviews and support but ultimately struggled through member changes and lack of album support. This forced Donovan and Olsen to chart their own course and caused the development of Donovan's music production career with Stock Market Audio, co-owned by Adrian Popovich. In addition to his studio work, Donovan also took time as The Dears' tour manager and guitarist.

== Recent career ==
In addition to his production company, Donovan continues his music career with the band Receivers. The Receivers have shared the stage with Sam Roberts Band, Beach House, The Clientele, The Black Heart Procession, Fleet Foxes, and They Are Nocturnal.

Donovan now works out of Mountain City Studios (co-owned by Popovich) and continues to produce acts, most recently the Sam Roberts Band, whose gold certified album Love at the End of the World garnered national success and won Donovan a Juno Award for Rock Album of the Year.

== Discography ==
=== Musician ===
Marlowe

- Galax-sea (1998)
- He Is There and He's Funny (2004)

Receivers

- Consider the Ravens (2008)

=== Recording ===
The Dears

- No Cities Left (2005)
- Gang of Losers (2006)
- Missiles (2008)

Sebastien Grainger

- Sebastien Grainger & The Mountains LP (2008)

Elephant Stone

- The Seven Seas (2009)

=== Producer ===
Marlowe

- He Is There and He's Funny (2004)
- Galax-sea (1998)

The High Dials

- War of The Wakening Phantoms (2005)
- The Holy Ground EP (2006)

Sam Roberts

- Chemical City (2006)
- Love at the End of the World (2008)

Receivers

- Consider the Ravens (2008)

Belgrave

- Untitled EP (2011-in production)
