= I Feel You (Sam Roberts Band song) =

Single by Sam Roberts Band

from the album Collider
- Released: March 8, 2011
- Genre: Alternative rock
- Length: 5:16 (Album); 3:32 (Radio edit)
- Label: Universal Music Canada/Island Def Jam
- Songwriter(s): Sam Roberts
- Producer(s): Brian Deck

Sam Roberts Band singles chronology
"Fixed to Ruin" (2009)	"I Feel You" (2011)	"The Last Crusade" (2011)

"I Feel You" is the first single from Sam Roberts' fourth studio album, Collider. It is the first single released under the moniker "Sam Roberts Band" instead of "Sam Roberts". The song was officially released to Canadian radio on February 28, with an iTunes Canada release of March 8.

== Music video ==
The music video for "I Feel You" was directed by Dave Pawsey and debuted on May 25, 2011. The video features a light show while the band performs.

== Charts ==
Chart (2011)	Peak position
Canadian Hot 100	83
Canada Rock Chart	3
Canadian Alternative Rock Chart	3
