= Sam Roberts (singer) =

Canadian singer-songwriter (born 1974)

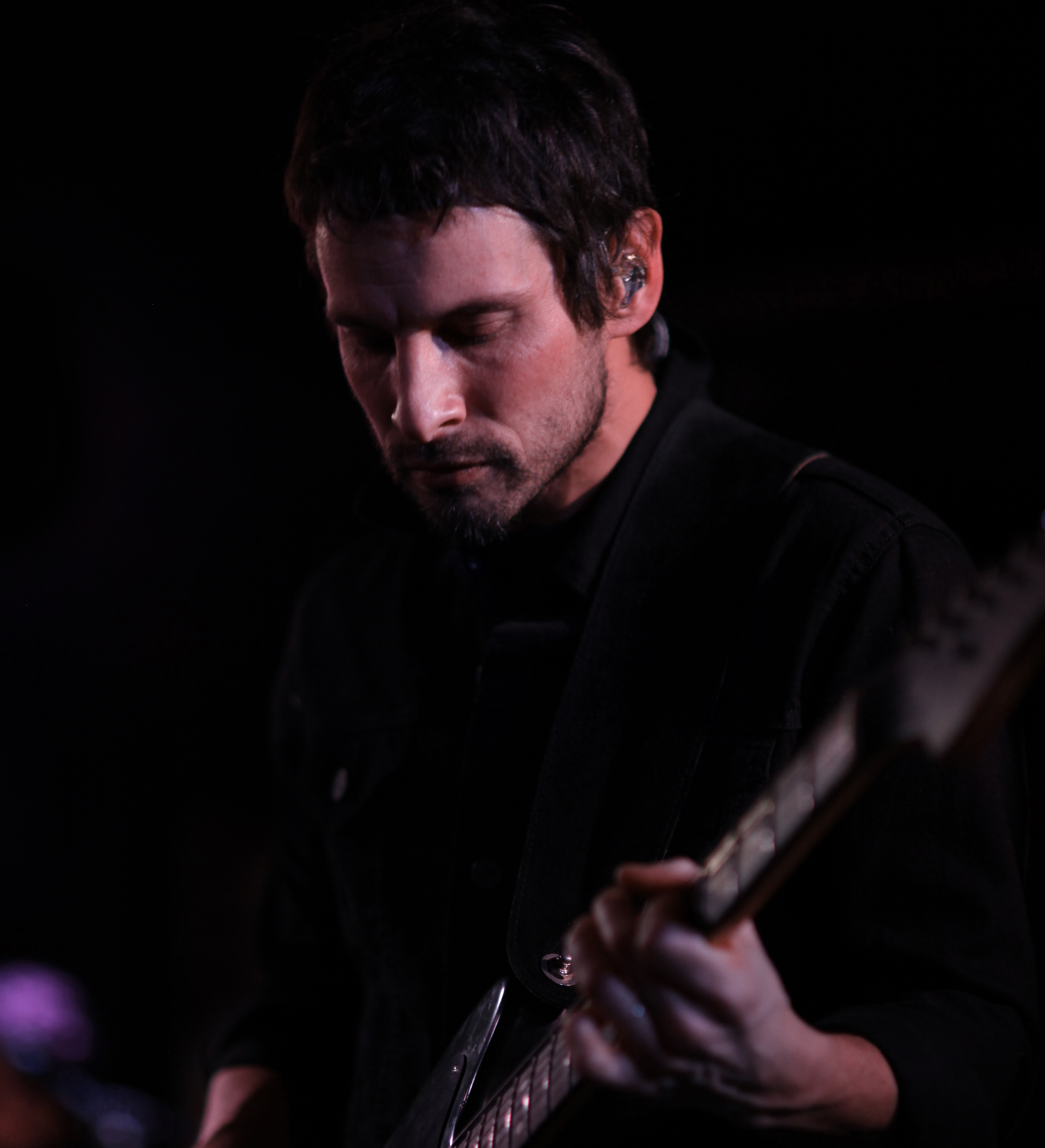
- Roberts performing at Mercury Lounge in New York City in February 2014.

Background information
- Born: October 2, 1974 (age 52); Westmount, Quebec, Canada
- Origin: Montreal, Quebec, Canada
- Genres: Indie rock, alternative rock
- Occupation: Singer-songwriter
- Instruments: Vocals; guitar; bass; violin
- Years active: 1993—present
- Labels: Secret Brain; MapleMusic Recordings; Universal Music Canada; Cordova Bay UK; Rounder; Pony Canyon (Japan); Lost Highway (USA)
- Member of: Sam Roberts Band, Anyway Gang
- Formerly of: William, Northstar
- Spinoffs: Anyway Gang
- Website: Sam Roberts Band

Sam Roberts (born October 2, 1974) is a Canadian rock singer-songwriter who has released seven albums. His debut EP The Inhuman Condition, reached the Canadian charts in 2002. He and his bandmates have released three albums as Sam Roberts and four albums as Sam Roberts Band. He is also a member of the Canadian group Anyway Gang, who released their debut self-titled album in 2019. Roberts has been nominated, together with his band, for fifteen Juno Awards, winning six, including Artist of the Year twice (2004 and 2009) and Album of the Year once (2004). From 1996 to 2016, Roberts was among the top 60 best-selling Canadian artists in Canada.

== Early life and Northstar ==
Born in Westmount, to South African immigrants who had arrived in Montreal three weeks earlier, Roberts grew up on Cedar Avenue in Pointe-Claire, where his family moved to when he was five years old. Roberts is an alumnus of St. Edmund Elementary School, Beaconsfield; Loyola High School, N.D.G.; John Abbott College, Ste. Anne de Bellevue; and McGill University. He holds a BA in English from McGill University, graduating in 1998. Roberts' first band was William in 1993, that changed into Northstar in 1998. As William they put out a single, "Piranha EP" on Northern Assembly Records in 1996, while as Northstar they released a self-titled independent EP in 1998, but broke up in 1999.

== As "Sam Roberts" (2002–2010) ==
After disbanding Northstar, Roberts recorded a twelve track demo, "Brother Down", which formed the basis for the EP, The Inhuman Condition released in 2002. Recorded with Jordon Zadorozny, Roberts "recorded a song a day". Roberts signed with artist manager Dave Spencer and began to perform live. With the assistance of Linda Bush at Universal Music Publishing Canada, he signed a publishing contract with UMPG and a record contract with MapleMusic Recordings. MapleMusic released the six track EP culled from the demo with Roberts noting that "it is not something I had intended to be my first real foray into the music world but I couldn't turn my back on such a chance". It included two breakthrough singles, "Brother Down" (released in mid-2002) and "Don't Walk Away Eileen" (released in late 2002) which were heavily promoted in the Canadian market.

In August 2002, Roberts signed with Universal Music. In November 2002, Roberts won the CASBY Award for "Favourite New Artist". In 2003, he released his major label debut album, We Were Born in a Flame, with the singles "Where Have All the Good People Gone?" and "Hard Road" garnering success in the Canadian market. The album achieved double platinum sales status in Canada and won two Juno Awards in 2004: Album of the Year and Rock Album of the Year, with Roberts winning the Juno award for Artist of the Year.

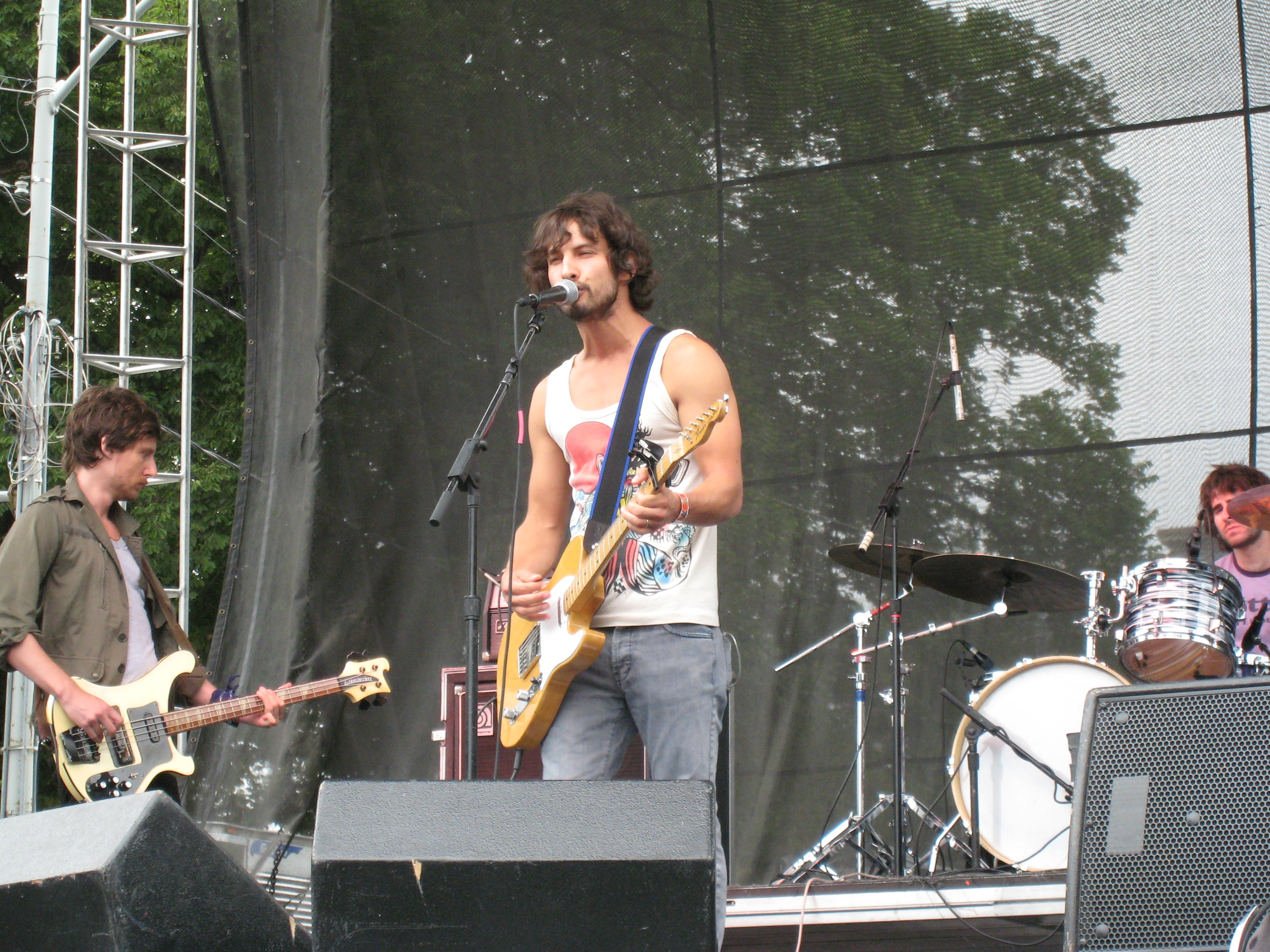
Sam Roberts performing at Lollapalooza in 2007.

Roberts’ second album, Chemical City, was released in April 2006, with the first single "The Gate" topping as a No. 1 hit on Canadian radio. The second single, "Bridge to Nowhere", won the Juno Award for Video of the Year in 2007 and the album achieved platinum sales status.

Roberts' third album, Love at the End of the World, released in May 2008, debuted at No. 1 on the Canadian album chart, a first for Roberts. The lead single, "Them Kids", debuted on iTunes on March 4, 2008. Roberts again won the Juno award for Artist of the Year and the album took home Rock Album of the Year and reached gold sales status.

== As Sam Roberts Band (2011–present) ==
Roberts released his fourth studio album, Collider, on May 10, 2011. It is the first album under the moniker "Sam Roberts Band" instead of "Sam Roberts". The first single, "I Feel You" was officially released to Canadian radio on February 28, with an iTunes Canada release of March 8.

On November 20, 2013, Roberts announced the release of next album, Lo-Fantasy, which was released by Paper Bag Records on February 11, 2014. Sam Roberts' Band released the Counting the Days EP on April 18, 2015. In 2015, the band collaborated with Toronto's Spearhead Brewery to release the "Sam Roberts Band Session Ale".

Their sixth studio album, Terraform, was released October 28, 2016. On September 12, 2016, a North-American tour was announced to promote their new album. Terraform was later nominated for a 2017 Juno Award for Rock Album of the Year, losing to The Tragically Hip's Man Machine Poem.

The band's seventh studio album, All of Us, was released worldwide on October 16, 2020, on Secret Weapon / Known Accomplice.

On October 20, 2023, Sam Roberts Band released their new album The Adventures Of Ben Blank, featuring the tracks "Picture Of Love" and "I Dream Of You".

== Sam Roberts Band members ==
The members of Sam Roberts Band as of 2020 are:

- Sam Roberts (lead vocals, guitar)
- Dave Nugent (lead guitar)
- Eric Fares (keyboard, guitar)
- James Hall (bass)
- Josh Trager (drums)

Past Members:

- Corey Zadorozny (drums)
- Chet Doxas (tenor saxophone)

== Discography ==
=== As Sam Roberts ===
- The Inhuman Condition (2002)
- We Were Born in a Flame (2003)
- Chemical City (2006)
- Love at the End of the World (2008)

=== As Sam Roberts Band ===
- Collider (2011)
- Lo-Fantasy (2014)
- TerraForm (2016)
- All of Us (2020)
- The Adventures Of Ben Blank (2023)

=== With Anyway Gang ===
- Anyway Gang (2019)
- Still Anyways (2022)

== Awards and nominations ==
=== Juno Awards ===
The Juno Awards is a Canadian awards ceremony presented annually by the Canadian Academy of Recording Arts and Sciences.

Year	Nominee / work	Award	Result
2003	"Brother Down"	Single of the Year	Nominated
2003	"Brother Down"	New Artist of the Year	Nominated
2004	We Were Born in a Flame	Album of the Year	Won
2004	We Were Born in a Flame	Rock Album of the Year	Won
2004	We Were Born in a Flame	Artist of the Year	Won
2007	"Bridge to Nowhere"	Video of the Year	Won
2007	Chemical City	Rock Album of the Year	Nominated
2009	Love at the End of the World	Artist of the Year	Won
2009	Love at the End of the World	Rock Album of the Year	Won
2009	"Detroit '67"	Video of the Year	Nominated
2012	"Them Kids"	Video of the Year	Nominated
2012	"Them Kids"	Group of the Year	Nominated
2012	Collider	Rock Album of the Year	Nominated
2017	TerraForm	Rock Album of the Year	Nominated
2021	All Of Us	Rock Album of the Year	Nominated

=== MuchMusic Video Awards ===
The MuchMusic Video Awards was an annual awards ceremony presented by the Canadian music video channel MuchMusic. Roberts has received five awards from fourteen nominations.

Year	Nominee / work	Award	Result
2003	"Brother Down"	Best VideoFACT	Won
2003	"Brother Down"	Best Pop Video	Nominated
2003	"Brother Down"	Best Independent Video	Nominated
2003	Sam Roberts	People's Choice – Favourite Canadian Artist	Nominated
2004	"Hard Road"	Best Director	Won
2004	"Hard Road"	Best Cinematography	Won
2004	"Hard Road"	Best Post-Production	Won
2004	"Hard Road"	Best Video	Nominated
2004	"Hard Road"	Best Pop Video	Nominated
2004	"Hard Road"	People's Choice – Favourite Canadian Artist	Nominated
2006	"The Gate"	Best MuchMoreMusic Award	Nominated
2006	"The Gate"	People's Choice – Favourite Canadian Artist	Nominated
2008	"Them Kids"	Best Director	Nominated
2008	"Them Kids"	Best Post-Production	Won

== Notable performances ==
- July 30, 2003: Opening performer at Molson Canadian Rocks for Toronto, otherwise referred to as SARStock, promoted to mitigate the economic downturn in Toronto following a limited outbreak of severe acute respiratory syndrome (SARS).
- June 12, 2003: National Hockey League's (NHL) NHL Awards ceremony main performer
- November 16, 2003: Canadian Football League's (CFL) 91st Grey Cup halftime show in Regina, Saskatchewan.
- July 2, 2005: Live 8 concert in Barrie, Ontario.
- January 1, 2008: AMP Energy NHL Winter Classic, outdoor ice hockey game in Buffalo, New York.
- August 2, 2008: Opened for The Eagles in Moncton, New Brunswick
- March 29, 2009: Performed at the 2009 Juno Awards
- July 18,19 2009: Performed at Folk on the Rocks, in Yellowknife, Northwest Territories.
- August 7, 2009: Performed a free concert at Cole Harbour, Nova Scotia, in honour of Sidney Crosby and his Stanley Cup win.
- February 20, 2010: Performed at 2010 Olympics in Vancouver.
- December 31, 2010: Performed free concert in Brampton, Ontario for New Year's Eve celebrations.
- June 25, 2011: Performed at Bobcaygeon Musicfest in Bobcaygeon.
- July 1, 2011: Performed a free concert in Ottawa on Canada Day for Prince William, Duke of Cambridge, and his wife Catherine, Duchess of Cambridge.
- December 31, 2013: Performed at Niagara Falls' New Year's concert alongside Serena Ryder and Demi Lovato.

== See also ==
- Canadian rock
- Music of Canada
