= Simple Plan discography =

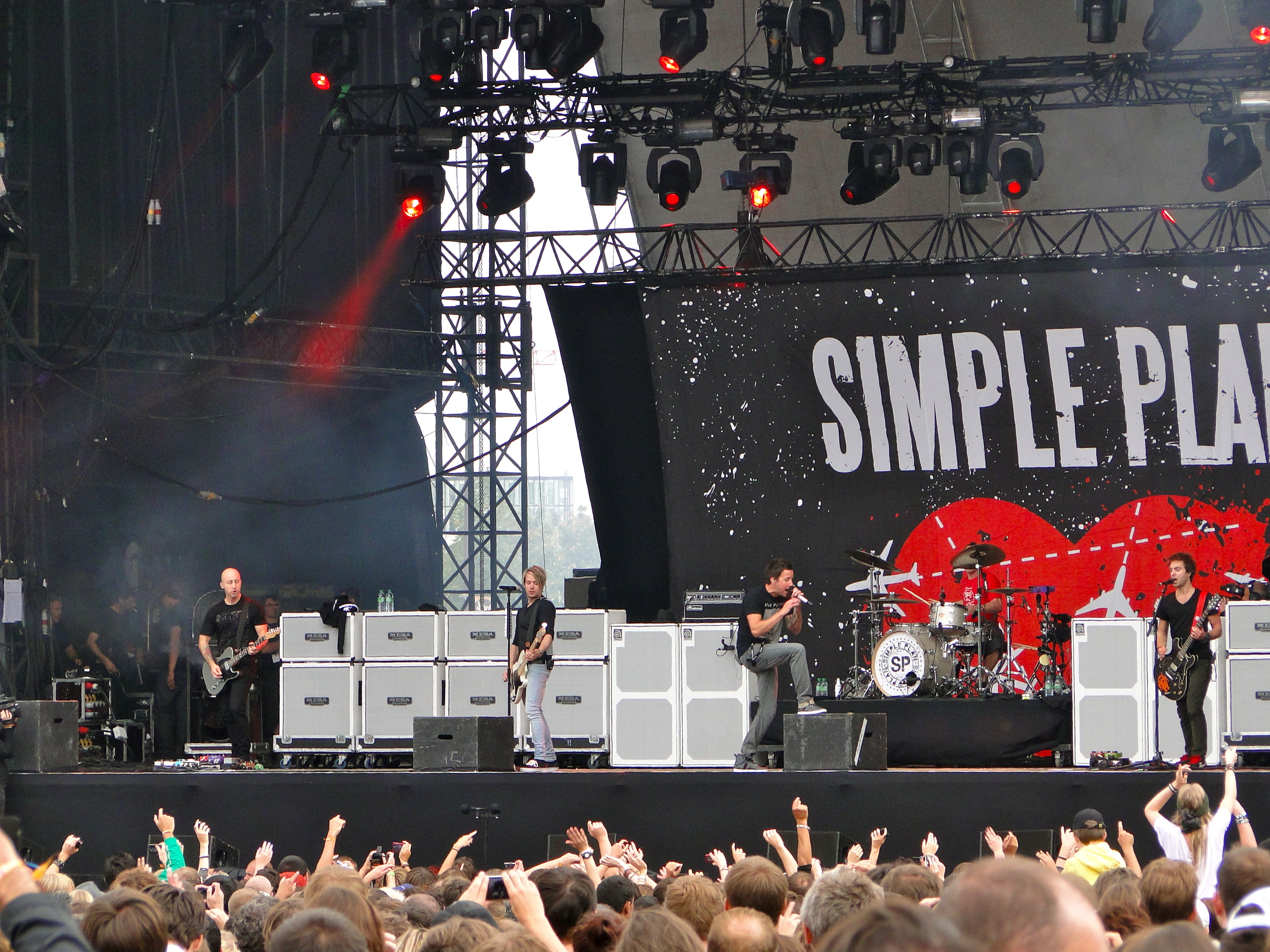
- Simple Plan at Rock en Seine, 2011
- Studio albums: 6
- Extended plays: 3
- Live albums: 2
- Singles: 22
- Video albums: 1
- Music videos: 31

Canadian rock band Simple Plan, formed in 1999, has released six studio albums, two live albums, one video album, three extended plays and twenty singles.

In 2002, they released their first album No Pads, No Helmets...Just Balls, which soon became a moderate commercial success and was certified multi-platinum in Canada and the United States and platinum in Australia. Of the four singles released, "Perfect" was the most successful, reaching the fifth position on the Canadian Hot 100, the sixth on the ARIA Singles Chart and the twenty-fourth on the Billboard Hot 100. In 2003, they released their first and so far only video album A Big Package for You and the live album Live in Japan 2002, which was released only in Canada and Japan in 2003. In 2004, they released the EP Live in Anaheim and their second studio album Still Not Getting Any.... The album outsold its predecessor in all countries except the US. The album spawned five singles: "Welcome to My Life" in 2004, "Shut Up!", "Untitled" and "Crazy" in 2005 and "Perfect World" in 2006. The first became the band's biggest hit, reaching the top ten in several countries.

MTV Hard Rock Live was released in 2005 and was the group's last release for close to three years, until their self-titled third studio album was released in 2008; it was later certified platinum in Canada. In 2009, the band released their second EP, iTunes Live from Montreal. The album Get Your Heart On! followed in 2011 and spawned four singles: "Can't Keep My Hands off You", "Jet Lag", "Astronaut" and "Summer Paradise".

As of 2022, Simple Plan has moved 5.1 million album units, 6 million singles and 700 million on demand streams of their songs in the United States alone.

== Albums ==
=== Studio albums ===
| Title | Album details | Peak chart positions | | | | | | | | | | Certifications |
| Title | Album details | CAN | AUS | AUT | FRA | JPN | NL | NZ | SWE | UK | US | Certifications |
|---|---|---|---|---|---|---|---|---|---|---|---|---|
| No Pads, No Helmets...Just Balls | Released: March 19, 2002; Label: Lava/Atlantic; Format: CD, CS, DL, LP | 22 | 29 | — | — | 20 | — | 5 | — | 179 | 35 | MC: 3× Platinum; ARIA: Platinum; BPI: Silver; RIAA: 2× Platinum; RIANZ: Gold |
| Still Not Getting Any... | Released: October 26, 2004; Label: Lava; Format: CD, CS, DL | 2 | 6 | 5 | 12 | 10 | 32 | 5 | 26 | 101 | 3 | MC: 4× Platinum; ARIA: 3× Platinum; BPI: Silver; RIAA: 2× Platinum; RIANZ: Platinum |
| Simple Plan | Released: February 12, 2008; Label: Atlantic; Format: CD, DL, LP | 2 | 6 | 9 | 16 | 9 | 43 | 12 | 7 | 31 | 14 | MC: Platinum |
| Get Your Heart On! | Released: June 21, 2011; Label: Atlantic; Format: CD, DL | 2 | 13 | 22 | 10 | 15 | 36 | — | 50 | 71 | 52 | MC: Platinum |
| Taking One for the Team | Released: February 19, 2016; Label: Atlantic; Format: CD, DL, LP | 4 | 12 | 18 | — | 21 | 59 | — | — | 44 | 94 | |
| Harder Than It Looks | Released: May 6, 2022; Label: Simple Plan; Format: CD, DL, LP | 84 | 67 | 59 | — | 60 | — | — | — | 32 | — | |
"—" denotes the album failed to chart or was not released

=== Live albums ===
| Title | Album details | Peak chart positions | | | | Certifications |
| Title | Album details | AUS | JPN | SWI | US | Certifications |
|---|---|---|---|---|---|---|
| Live in Japan 2002 | Released: January 21, 2003 (Japan only); Label: Atlantic; Format: CD, DL | — | 164 | — | — | |
| MTV Hard Rock Live | Released: October 4, 2005; Label: Lava; Format: CD, CS, DL, CD/DVD | 28 | 59 | 84 | 119 | MC: Platinum |
"—" denotes the album failed to chart or was not released

== Extended plays ==
| Title | EP details | Peak chart positions | |
| Title | EP details | AUS | JPN |
|---|---|---|---|
| Live in Anaheim | Released: February 21, 2004; Label: Atlantic; Format: CD, DL | — | — |
| iTunes Live from Montreal | Released: September 30, 2009; Label: Atlantic; Format: CD, DL | — | — |
| Get Your Heart On – The Second Coming! | Released: December 3, 2013; Label: Atlantic; Format: CD, DL | 53 | 62 |
"—" denotes the EP failed to chart or was not released

== Singles ==
| Title | Year | Peak chart positions | | | | | | | | | | Certifications | Album |
| Title | Year | CAN | AUS | BEL | FRA | GER | NL | NZ | SWE | UK | US | Certifications | Album |
|---|---|---|---|---|---|---|---|---|---|---|---|---|---|
| "I'm Just a Kid" | 2002 | — | — | — | — | — | — | — | — | — | — | RIAA: 2× Platinum; BPI: Silver; RMNZ: Gold | No Pads, No Helmets...Just Balls |
| "I'd Do Anything" (featuring Mark Hoppus) | 2002 | — | 92 | — | — | — | — | — | — | 78 | 51 | RIAA: Platinum | No Pads, No Helmets...Just Balls |
| "Addicted" | 2003 | — | 10 | — | — | — | — | — | — | 63 | 45 | RIAA: Gold | No Pads, No Helmets...Just Balls |
| "Perfect" | 2003 | 5 | 6 | — | — | — | — | 14 | — | — | 24 | ARIA: Platinum; RIAA: Platinum; RMNZ: Gold | No Pads, No Helmets...Just Balls |
| "Don't Wanna Think About You" | 2004 | — | — | — | — | — | — | — | — | — | — | | Scooby Doo 2: Monsters Unleashed |
| "Welcome to My Life" | 2004 | 2 (Note: "Welcome to My Life" did not enter the Canadian Singles Chart as it was not released as a physical single in Canada but did peak at number two on the Radio & Records CHR/Pop Top 30.) | 7 | 58 | 12 | 70 | 39 | 5 | 33 | 49 | 40 | MC: 2× Platinum; ARIA: Platinum; RIAA: 2× Platinum; RMNZ: Gold | Still Not Getting Any... |
| "Shut Up!" | 2005 | 12 (Note: "Shut Up!" did not enter the Canadian Singles Chart as it was not released as a physical single in Canada but did peak at number 12 on the Radio & Records CHR/Pop Top 30.) | 14 | — | — | 25 | 35 | 11 | 3 | 44 | 99 | MC: Gold; ARIA: Gold; RIAA: Gold | Still Not Getting Any... |
| "Untitled (How Could This Happen to Me?)" | 2005 | 4 (Note: "Untitled (How Could This Happen to Me?)" did not enter the Canadian Singles Chart as it was not released as a physical single in Canada but did peak at number four on the Radio & Records CHR/Pop Top 30.) | 9 | 67 | — | — | 51 | 20 | 3 | 183 | 49 | MC: Platinum; ARIA: Gold; IFPI SWE: Gold; RIAA: Gold | Still Not Getting Any... |
| "Crazy" | 2005 | 8 (Note: "Untitled (How Could This Happen to Me?)" did not enter the Canadian Singles Chart as it was not released as a physical single in Canada but did peak at number eight on the Radio & Records CHR/Pop Top 30.) | 32 | — | 38 | — | — | — | 39 | 105 | — | | Still Not Getting Any... |
| "When I'm Gone" | 2007 | 11 | 14 | 62 | — | 42 | 78 | — | 23 | 26 | — | | Simple Plan |
| "Your Love Is a Lie" | 2008 | 16 | 33 | 52 | — | 37 | 88 | — | — | 63 | — (Note: "Your Love Is a Lie" did not enter the Billboard Hot 100 but did peak at number eight on the Billboard Bubbling Under Hot 100, which acts as a 25-song extension.) | | Simple Plan |
| "Save You" | 2008 | 18 | 92 | — | — | — | — | — | — | — | — | | Simple Plan |
| "Can't Keep My Hands Off You" (featuring Rivers Cuomo) | 2011 | 70 | 45 | — | — | — | — | — | — | — | — | | Get Your Heart On! |
| "Jet Lag" (featuring Natasha Bedingfield or Marie-Mai) | 2011 | 11 | 8 | 47 | 11 | 59 | 81 | — | — | — | — (Note: "Jet Lag" did not enter the Billboard Hot 100, but peaked at number 92 on the US Airplay Top 100 chart.) | MC: 2× Platinum; ARIA: 2× Platinum | Get Your Heart On! |
| "Astronaut" | 2011 | — | — | 118 | — | — | — | — | — | — | — | | Get Your Heart On! |
| "Summer Paradise" (featuring K'naan or Sean Paul) | 2012 | 8 | 4 | 16 | 21 | 9 | 22 | 28 | 4 | 12 | — | MC: 5× Platinum; ARIA: 2× Platinum; BPI: Silver | Get Your Heart On! |
| "I Don't Wanna Go to Bed" (featuring Nelly) | 2015 | 54 | — | — | — | — | — | — | — | — | — | MC: Gold | Taking One for the Team |
| "Singing in the Rain" | 2016 | — | — | — | — | — | — | — | — | — | — | | Taking One for the Team |
| "Perfectly Perfect" | 2016 | — | — | — | — | — | — | — | — | — | — | | Taking One for the Team |
| "Where I Belong" (with State Champs featuring We the Kings) | 2019 | — | — | — | — | — | — | — | — | — | — | | Non-album singles |
| "What's New Scooby-Doo?" (Note: Rerecording of the theme song from the television series What's New, Scooby-Doo?) | 2021 | — | — | — | — | — | — | — | — | — | — | | Non-album singles |
| "The Antidote" | 2021 | — (Note: "The Antidote" did not enter the Billboard Canadian Hot 100, but peaked at number 36 on the Canadian Digital Song Sales chart.) | — | — | — | — | — | — | — | — | — | | Harder Than It Looks |
| "Ruin My Life" (featuring Deryck Whibley) | 2022 | — (Note: "Ruin My Life" did not enter the Billboard Canadian Hot 100, but peaked at number 46 on the Canadian Digital Song Sales chart.) | — | — | — | — | — | — | — | — | — | | Harder Than It Looks |
| "Congratulations" | 2022 | — | — | — | — | — | — | — | — | — | — | | Harder Than It Looks |
| "Wake Me Up (When This Nightmare's Over)" | 2022 | — | — | — | — | — | — | — | — | — | — | | Harder Than It Looks |
| "Young & Dumb" (with Avril Lavigne) | 2025 | — | — | — | — | — | — | — | — | — | — | | TBA |
| "Nothing Changes" | 2025 | — | — | — | — | — | — | — | — | — | — | | The Kids in the Crowd - Music from the Documentary Soundtrack |
"—" denotes a recording that did not chart or was not released to that territory.

=== Promotional singles ===
| Title | Year | Peak chart positions | Album |
| Title | Year | MEX | Album |
|---|---|---|---|
| "Saturday" | 2015 | — | Non-album single |
| "Boom" | 2015 | — | Taking One for the Team |
| "I Don't Wanna Be Sad" | 2015 | — | Taking One for the Team |
| "Christmas Every Day" | 2016 | 41 | Non-album single |
"—" denotes a recording that did not chart or was not released to that territory.

== Other charted songs ==
| Title | Year | Peak chart positions | | | | | | | Album |
| Title | Year | CAN | CAN AC | CAN CHR | CAN Hot AC | CAN Rock | CZ | CZ Rock | Album |
|---|---|---|---|---|---|---|---|---|---|
| "Me Against the World" | 2004 | — | — | — | — | 24 | — | — | Still Not Getting Any... |
| "Perfect World" | 2004 | — | — | 34 | — | — | — | — | Still Not Getting Any... |
| "Jump" | 2004 | — | — | — | — | — | 57 | — | Still Not Getting Any... |
| "No Love" | 2009 | 77 | — | — | 21 | — | — | — | Simple Plan |
| "Generation" | 2009 | 90 | — | 33 | 50 | — | — | — | Simple Plan |
| "This Song Saved My Life" | 2013 | — | — | — | 50 | — | — | — | Get Your Heart On! |
| "Fire in My Heart" | 2014 | — | 46 | — | 36 | — | — | — | Get Your Heart On – The Second Coming! |
| "Opinion Overload" | 2016 | — | — | — | — | — | — | 2 | Taking One for the Team |
| "Iconic" | 2022 | — | — | — | — | — | 7 | 1 | Harder Than It Looks |
"—" denotes a recording that did not chart or was not released to that territory.

== Videography ==
=== Video albums ===
| Title | Album details | Certifications |
|---|---|---|
| A Big Package for You | Released: November 25, 2003; Label: Lava | MC: Platinum; ARIA: Gold; RIAA: Gold |

=== Music videos ===
| Song | Year | Director |
|---|---|---|
| "I'm Just a Kid" | 2002 | Smith N' Borin |
| "I'd Do Anything" | 2002 | Smith N' Borin |
| "Addicted" | 2003 | Smith N' Borin |
| "Perfect" | 2003 | Liz Friedlander |
| "Don't Wanna Think About You" (Original and Director's Cut versions) | 2004 | Smith N' Borin |
| "Welcome to My Life" | 2004 | Phillip Atwell |
| "Shut Up!" | 2005 | Eric White and Simple Plan |
| "Untitled (How Could This Happen to Me?)" | 2005 | Marc Klasfeld and Simple Plan |
| "Crazy" | 2005 | Marc Klasfeld |
| "Perfect World" | 2006 | Simple Plan |
| "When I'm Gone" | 2007 | Frank Borin and Simple Plan |
| "Your Love Is a Lie" | 2008 | Wayne Isham |
| "Save You" | 2008 | RT! |
| "I Can Wait Forever" | 2009 | Animax |
| "Can't Keep My Hands Off You" (featuring Rivers Cuomo) | 2011 | Frank Borin and Simple Plan |
| "Jet Lag" (featuring Natasha Bedingfield, Marie-Mai, Kotak or Kelly Cha) | 2011 | Frank Borin and Simple Plan |
| "Astronaut" | 2011 | Mark Staubach |
| "Loser Of The Year" | 2011 | Mark Staubach |
| "Summer Paradise" (featuring K'naan, Sean Paul, Taka or MKTO) | 2011 | Mark Staubach |
| "This Song Saved My Life" (MTV Exit version) | 2012 | Ash Boland |
| "This Song Saved My Life" | 2013 | David F. Mewa |
| "The Rest of Us" | 2013 | Simple Plan |
| "Boom!" | 2015 | Chady Awad |
| "I Don't Wanna Go To Bed" (featuring Nelly) | 2015 | Mark Staubach |
| "Opinion Overload" | 2016 | Mark Staubach |
| "Singing in the Rain" | 2016 | Mark Staubach |
| "Perfectly Perfect" | 2016 | Mark Staubach |
| "Where I Belong" | 2019 | Simple Plan |
| "The Antidote" | 2021 | Jensen Noen |
| "Ruin My Life" (featuring Deryck Whibley) | 2022 | Jensen Noen |
| "Wake Me Up (When This Nightmare's Over)" | 2022 | Jensen Noen |
| "Can You Feel the Love Tonight" | 2024 | Lucas Allegretto |
| "Nothing Changes" | 2025 | Eric Richards |
