= David Desrosiers =

Canadian bassist (born 1980)

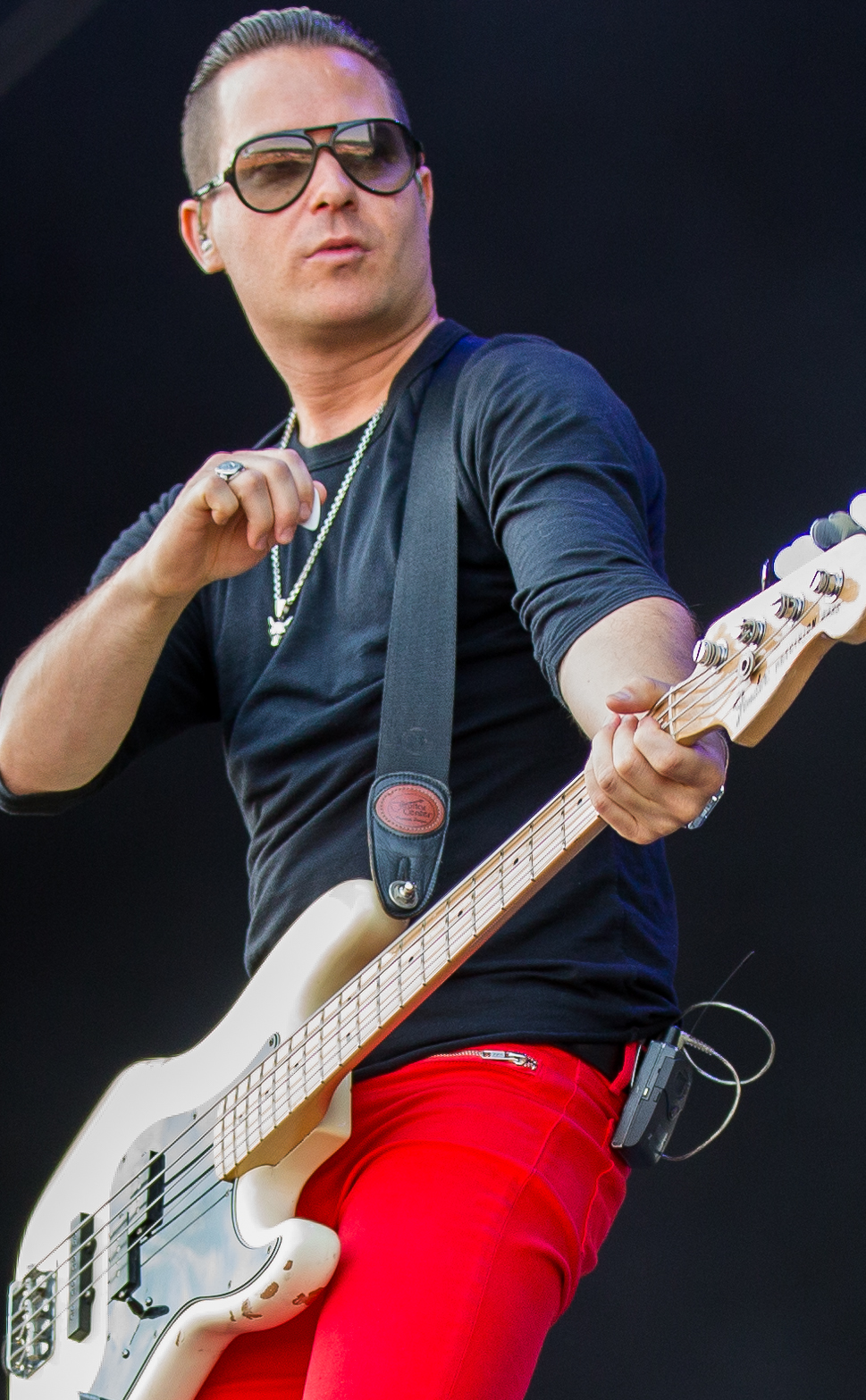
- Desrosiers performing with Simple Plan in 2015

Background information
- Born: David Phillipe Desrosiers; August 29, 1980 (age 45); Sept-Îles, Quebec, Canada
- Genres: Pop-punk; punk rock; skate punk; alternative rock; pop rock; emo; power pop
- Occupation: Musician
- Instruments: Bass guitar; vocals
- Years active: 1999–2020
- Formerly of: Simple Plan; Reset

David Phillipe Desrosiers (born August 29, 1980) is a Canadian musician best known as the former bassist and backing vocalist of the rock band Simple Plan. He left the band in 2020 following sexual misconduct allegations from women on social media.

== Career ==
In 1999, Pierre Bouvier left Reset soon after to join Chuck Comeau in Simple Plan. Desrosiers replaced Bouvier in Reset, which impressed Bouvier and Comeau. Desrosiers was interested in joining another band when he was asked to join the new outfit. He too left the band six months later to join Simple Plan. In 2002, Simple Plan released their debut studio album, No Pads, No Helmets...Just Balls, which featured the singles "I'm Just a Kid", "I'd Do Anything", "Addicted", and "Perfect".

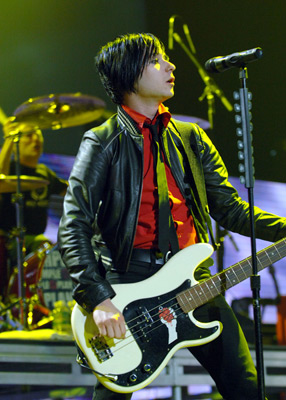
Desrosiers performing with Simple Plan in 2007

In 2004, Simple Plan released its second album, Still Not Getting Any... which was produced by Bob Rock and led to the subsequent singles, "Welcome to My Life", "Shut Up", "Untitled (How Could This Happen to Me?)", "Crazy", and (in some markets) "Perfect World".

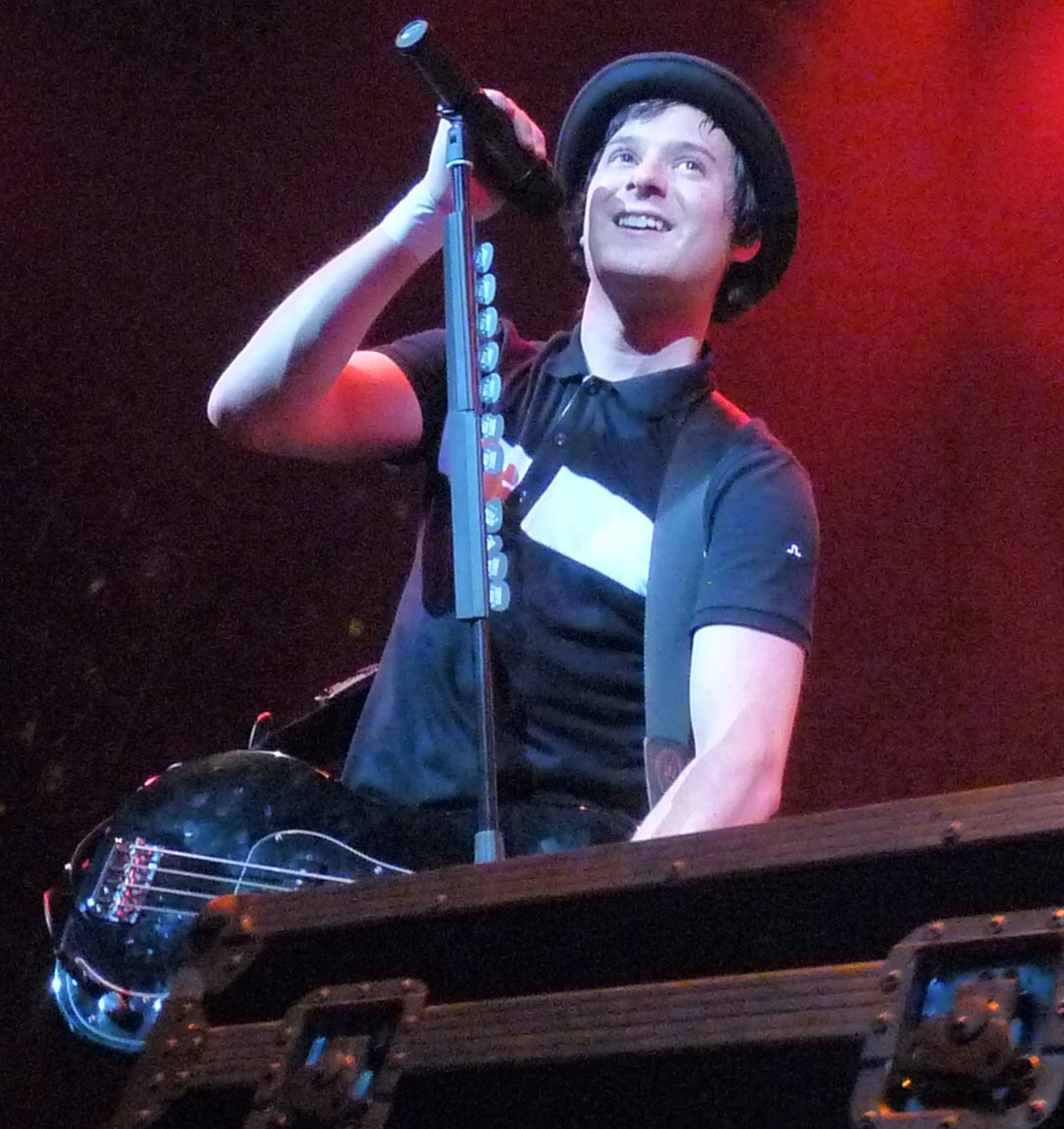
Desrosiers in 2009

Desrosiers recorded six albums with the band before May 2017, he had been on hiatus from touring with Simple Plan, while he was at home recovering from depression. During that time, a touring musician named Chady Awad had been performing bass with the band as a touring substitute for more than two years, while Bouvier and Lefebvre had divided Desrosiers' vocal parts. This marks the second time Desrosiers has been absent from the band; the first time was in December 2008, when Lefebvre temporarily switched to bass for 2 weeks during live performances.

On June 8, 2019, the band reunited with Desrosiers in Cleveland, Ohio, marking his official return to the band.

On July 10, 2020, Desrosiers announced in his Instagram account that he is withdrawing from the band after "recent public statements have led me to acknowledge that some of the interactions I have had with women have caused them harm."

== Personal life ==
Desrosiers is a vegan and been a vocal supporter of animal rights, previously collaborating with the Montreal Society for the Prevention of Cruelty to Animals (SPCA).

== Equipment ==
During his professional career, Desrosiers primarily used Fender Precision basses. He also used Squier basses.

== Discography ==
Simple Plan

- No Pads, No Helmets...Just Balls (2002)
- Still, Not Getting Any... (2004)
- Simple Plan (2008)
- Get Your Heart On! (2011)
- Taking One for the Team (2016)

== Filmography ==
Year	Title	Role	Notes
2002	The New Guy	David the Bassist	Uncredited
2003	The New Tom Green Show	Himself	1 episode
2003	Simple Plan: A Big Package for You	Himself	
2004	What's New, Scooby-Doo?	Himself (voice)	Episode: "Simple Plan and the Invisible Madman"
2004	New York Minute	Himself	
2004	Punk Rock Holocaust	Himself	
2004	Simple Plan: Still Not Getting Any...	Himself	
2005	Simple Plan: MTV Hard Rock Live	Himself	
2008	Simple Plan: Self Titled	Himself	

== See also ==
- Animal rights and punk subculture
