= Don't Wanna Think About You =

Single by Simple Plan

from the album Scooby-Doo 2: Monsters Unleashed: The Album
- Released: March 2, 2004
- Recorded: 2004
- Studio: Ruby Red Productions (Atlanta)
- Genre: Pop-punk
- Length: 3:26
- Label: Warner Sunset; Warner Bros.
- Songwriters: Jean-Francois Stinco; Chuck Comeau; Pierre Bouvier; Sébastien Lefebvre; David Desrosiers
- Producer: Butch Walker

Simple Plan singles chronology
"Perfect" (2003)	"Don't Wanna Think About You" (2004)	"Welcome to My Life" (2004)

Scooby-Doo singles chronology
"Land of a Million Drums" (2002)	"Don't Wanna Think About You" (2004)

Audio video
- "Don't Wanna Think About You" on YouTube

"Don't Wanna Think About You" is a song by Canadian rock band Simple Plan. It appeared on the soundtrack to the film Scooby-Doo 2: Monsters Unleashed, serving as the film's theme song. The song was released to iTunes through Warner Bros. Records and to radio on March 2, 2004 in promotion of the film.

== Track listing ==
Digital download

- "Don't Wanna Think About You" (from Scooby-Doo 2: Monsters Unleashed) – 3:26

== Personnel ==
Personnel per booklet.

Simple Plan

- Pierre Bouvier – lead vocals
- Chuck Comeau – drums
- Jeff Stinco – guitars
- Sebastien Lefebvre – guitars, background vocals
- David Desrosiers – bass, background vocals

Additional musicians

- Butch Walker – additional vocals

Production

- Butch Walker – producer
- Russ-T Cobb – engineer, mixing
- Sean Loughlin – assistant engineer
- Christie Proide – production coordinator
- Bob Ludwig – mastering

== Music video ==
The music video for "Don't Wanna Think About You" was directed by Smith n' Borin and premiered on February 27, 2004. An edited version was made available for purchase on iTunes on January 11, 2006. The video is also included in the special features on the DVD for Scooby Doo 2: Monsters Unleashed.

The story for the video revolves around the band members racing through the city trying to reach the premiere of Scooby Doo 2 on time. To give their trek a sense of urgency, the video uses the on-screen digital clock concept of the show 24, although compressed for the duration of the song. The Mystery Machine and the cast of the film are featured briefly as the band arrives at the theatre.

Two versions of the music video exist: One version of the video shows that the time frame of the video is 5:00 pm to 6:00 pm. Another version formerly embedded on Bouvier's official Myspace page has the time frame of the video as 4:00 pm to 5:00 pm, and used official sounds from the 24 TV series, including Kiefer Sutherland's announcement of which hours of the day the events take place in-between.

== Chart performance ==
Chart (2004)	Peak position
Canada CHR/Pop Top 30 (Radio & Records)	25
US Hot Digital Tracks (Billboard)	47
US Pop Airplay (Billboard)	37
