= MTV Hard Rock Live =

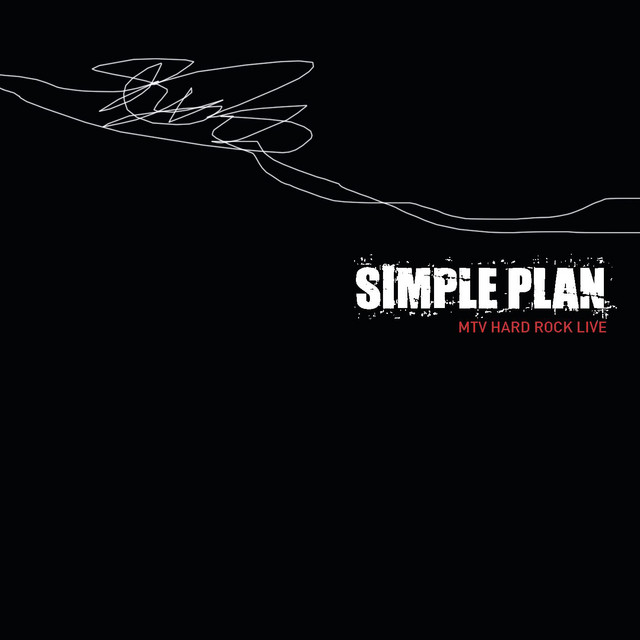

Live album by Simple Plan
- Released: October 4, 2005
- Genres: Pop-punk; alternative rock
- Length: 1:04:34
- Labels: Lava; Atlantic
- Producers: Brian J. Murphy; Christina Hull; Rob Cowlyn; Mitch Goldstein; Mike Davis

Simple Plan chronology
Still Not Getting Any... (2004)	MTV Hard Rock Live (2005)	Simple Plan (2008)

Simple Plan video chronology
Still Not Getting Any... (2004)	MTV Hard Rock Live (2005)	Simple Plan (2008)

MTV Hard Rock Live is the second live album by the Canadian rock band Simple Plan, recorded on May 31, 2005 in Orlando, Florida, and released on CD and DVD on October 4 of the same year by Lava and Atlantic Records.

In addition to the 13 live tracks, the album also features three bonus tracks: acoustic versions of "Crazy", "Welcome to My Life", and "Perfect". The Japanese version of the album also includes a live version of "Promise". In Brazil, the album was awarded a Gold Record by ABPD for selling over 25,000 copies in the country.

== Track listing ==
No.	Title	Length
1.	"Shut Up!"	4:18
2.	"Jump"	4:32
3.	"The Worst Day Ever"	4:20
4.	"Addicted"	4:14
5.	"Me Against the World"	3:46
6.	"Crazy"	4:58
7.	"God Must Hate Me"	4:02
8.	"Thank You"	5:39
9.	"Welcome to My Life"	4:52
10.	"I'm Just a Kid"	5:07
11.	"I'd Do Anything"	4:44
12.	"Untitled (How Could This Happen to Me?)"	4:23
13.	"Perfect"	5:45

=== Bonus tracks ===
No.	Title	Length
14.	"Crazy (Acoustic version) (Re-Release/Deluxe Edition)"	3:55
15.	"Welcome To My Life (Acoustic version) (Deluxe Edition)"	3:35
16.	"Perfect (Acoustic version) (Deluxe Edition)"	4:06
17.	"Promise (Live)" (Japanese edition)"

The bonus tracks, excluding Welcome to My Life (Acoustic version) And Perfect (Acoustic version) are only available on the deluxe & Japan deluxe edition .

== Versions ==
In 2005, Simple Plan released the live album, MTV Hard Rock Live which contained songs from both of their previous albums. The album came in two different versions — a standard one, and a fan pack edition. The standard edition included audio of the whole performance, an acoustic version of Crazy, two live videos of the performance of the first two songs "Jump" and "Shut Up!", and a small booklet of pictures of the performance. The fan pack edition contained audio and video of the whole performance in 5.1 surround sound, three acoustic tracks for "Crazy", "Welcome to My Life", and "Perfect", a 32-page color tour book, and an exclusive Simple Plan patch and pin.

== Charts ==
Chart (2005)	Peak position
Australian Albums (ARIA)	28
Canadian Albums (Nielsen SoundScan)	23
Japanese Albums (Oricon)	59
Swiss Albums (Schweizer Hitparade)	84
US Billboard 200	119

== Certifications ==
Region	Certification	Certified units/sales
Brazil (Pro-Música Brasil)	Gold	50,000^{*}
Canada (Music Canada)	Platinum	100,000^{‡}
^{*} Sales figures based on certification alone.^{‡} Sales+streaming figures based on certification alone.
