= ITunes Live from Montreal =

iTunes Live from Montreal may refer to:

- iTunes Live from Montreal (Joseph Arthur album), 2009
- iTunes Live from Montreal (Good Charlotte album), 2009
- iTunes Live from Montreal (Simple Plan EP), a 2009 EP by Simple Plan
