= Get Your Heart On – The Second Coming! =

EP by Simple Plan
- Released: 29 November 2013 (Australia); 3 December 2013 (worldwide); 29 January 2014 (Japan)
- Recorded: 2013
- Length: 24:25
- Label: Atlantic

Simple Plan chronology
Get Your Heart On! (2011)	Get Your Heart On – The Second Coming! (2013)	Taking One for the Team (2016)

Get Your Heart On – The Second Coming! is an EP by Canadian rock band Simple Plan, composed primarily of B-sides from Get Your Heart On!. It was released on 29 November 2013 in Australia and on 3 December 2013 worldwide except for Japan, where it was released on 29 January 2014.

== Track listing ==
No.	Title	Length
1.	"Ordinary Life"	3:24
2.	"The Rest of Us"	3:13
3.	"Outta My System"	3:25
4.	"Fire in My Heart"	3:26
5.	"In"	3:42
6.	"Lucky One"	3:50
7.	"Try"	3:25
Total length:		24:25

Bonus tracks Japanese edition
No.	Title	Length
8.	"Astronaut" (live in Melbourne)	3:48
9.	"Loser of the Year" (live in Melbourne)	3:30
Total length:		31:03

== Charts ==
=== Album ===
Chart (2013)	Peak position
Australian Albums (ARIA)	53
Japanese Albums (Oricon)	62

=== Charted songs ===
Year	Song	Peak chart position	
Year	Song	CAN AC	CAN Hot AC
2014	"Fire in My Heart"	46	36

== Personnel ==
- Pierre Bouvier – lead vocals
- Sebastien Lefebvre – rhythm guitar, background vocals
- David Desrosiers – bass, background vocals
- Jeff Stinco – lead guitar
- Chuck Comeau – drums
