= Untitled (How Could This Happen to Me?) =

2005 single by Simple Plan

Single by Simple Plan

from the album Still Not Getting Any...
- Released: March 29, 2005
- Genre: Emo; emo-pop
- Length: 4:00 (album version); 3:31 (video version)
- Label: Lava
- Songwriters: Pierre Bouvier; Chuck Comeau
- Producer: Bob Rock

Simple Plan singles chronology
"Shut Up!" (2005)	"Untitled (How Could This Happen to Me?)" (2005)	"Crazy" (2005)

Music video
- "Untitled (How Could This Happen to Me?)" on YouTube

"Untitled (How Could This Happen to Me?)" is a song by Canadian rock band Simple Plan. The ballad was released in March 2005 as the third single from their second studio album, Still Not Getting Any.... The song's official title, when the CD was released, was simply "Untitled".

== Music video ==
The music video tells a story of a car crash on a rainy evening where a young male drunk driver crashes his Toyota Camry head-on into a Trans Am driven by a female, resulting in her death. The drunk driver, however, survives relatively uninjured, and ends up arrested by the FBI and the BATF. The video was filmed near the famous tunnel in Griffith Park, Los Angeles. Vocalist Pierre Bouvier is seen singing the song at the scene of the car crash, and is also seen at the end of the video where the victim is at the hospital. The other band members portray the emergency responders in the video.

The video also shows the backstory of the car crash, accompanied by clips of the victim's family doing things such as: her brother is seen playing video games in the family living room, her sister is doing her homework in her bedroom, their mom is in her house's kitchen washing dishes and their dad is working in his office. Then abruptly just as the two cars collide, the entire family is violently thrown into the walls surrounding them as the boy falls out of his bedroom window and the dad lands on his computer. In a joint letter with MADD, Simple Plan explained the events in the video:

This song is a very personal look at what happens when tragedy hits close to home and we wanted to make a video that was as powerful and as special as the song was to the five of us.

Over the last few years, a lot of people we know have been involved in tragic accidents caused by drinking and driving. One of the students at our high-school crashed his car driving back from a weekend trip and killed his best friend. It was a very sad time that none of us will ever forget.

This is the story we wanted to tell with this video: the story of all the innocent victims caused by drinking and driving. We hope you will take the time to watch the video. Thanks for all your support.

== Live performances ==
When performed live, Bouvier performs the guitar solo in the middle of the song. Lead guitarist Jeff Stinco plays a semi-acoustic guitar until the solo when rhythm guitarist Sébastien Lefebvre and drummer Chuck Comeau also come. Bassist David Desrosiers' main role is backing vocals, with his bass taking a backseat until Bouvier's solo and the final chorus. Stinco also plays an additional solo as the song fades out.

== Reception and legacy ==
In 2025, Will Howard of Far Out Magazine put the song at the top of his list of "Five pop-punk songs from the 2000s so bad they feel like parodies". He wrote: "A band that named their first two albums No Pads, No Helmets...Just Balls and Still Not Getting Any..., respectively, decided to go serious. [...] An admirable cause, yet one whiffed so spectacularly by the band that it sounds more like naval-gazing self-pitying than anything made by the emo bands of the day. 'I’ve made my mistakes,' Pierre Bouvier whines on the nauseating chorus. Too fucking right he has."

== In other media ==
The song has since been used in Mothers Against Drunk Driving anti-drunk driving campaigns.

== Track listings ==
European CD single

1. "Untitled (How Could This Happen to Me?)"
2. "Welcome to My Life" (live)

Australian CD single

1. "Untitled (How Could This Happen to Me?)"
2. "Welcome to My Life" (live)
3. "Jump" (live)

== Charts ==
=== Weekly charts ===
Chart (2005–2006)	Peak position
Australia (ARIA)	9
Belgium (Ultratip Bubbling Under Flanders)	17
Canada AC Top 30 (Radio & Records)	4
Canada CHR/Pop Top 30 (Radio & Records)	4
Canada Hot AC Top 30 (Radio & Records)	8
Czech Republic Airplay (ČNS IFPI)	52
Netherlands (Dutch Top 40)	36
Netherlands (Single Top 100)	51
New Zealand (Recorded Music NZ)	20
Sweden (Sverigetopplistan)	3
Switzerland (Schweizer Hitparade)	7
UK Singles (OCC)	183
US Billboard Hot 100	49
US Adult Pop Airplay (Billboard)	26
US Pop Airplay (Billboard)	16

=== Year-end charts ===
Chart (2005)	Position
Australia (ARIA)	46
US Adult Top 40 (Billboard)	96
US Mainstream Top 40 (Billboard)	71

Chart (2006)	Position
Sweden (Hitlistan)	55
Switzerland (Schweizer Hitparade)	56

== Certifications ==
Region	Certification	Certified units/sales
Australia (ARIA)	Gold	35,000^{^}
Canada (Music Canada)	Platinum	80,000^{‡}
Sweden (GLF)	Gold	10,000^{^}
United States (RIAA)	Gold	500,000^{‡}
^{^} Shipments figures based on certification alone.^{‡} Sales+streaming figures based on certification alone.

== Release history ==
Region	Date	Format(s)	Label(s)	Ref.
United States	March 29, 2005	Contemporary hit radio	Lava	
Australia	June 20, 2005	CD	Lava	
