= Simple Plan =

Canadian rock band

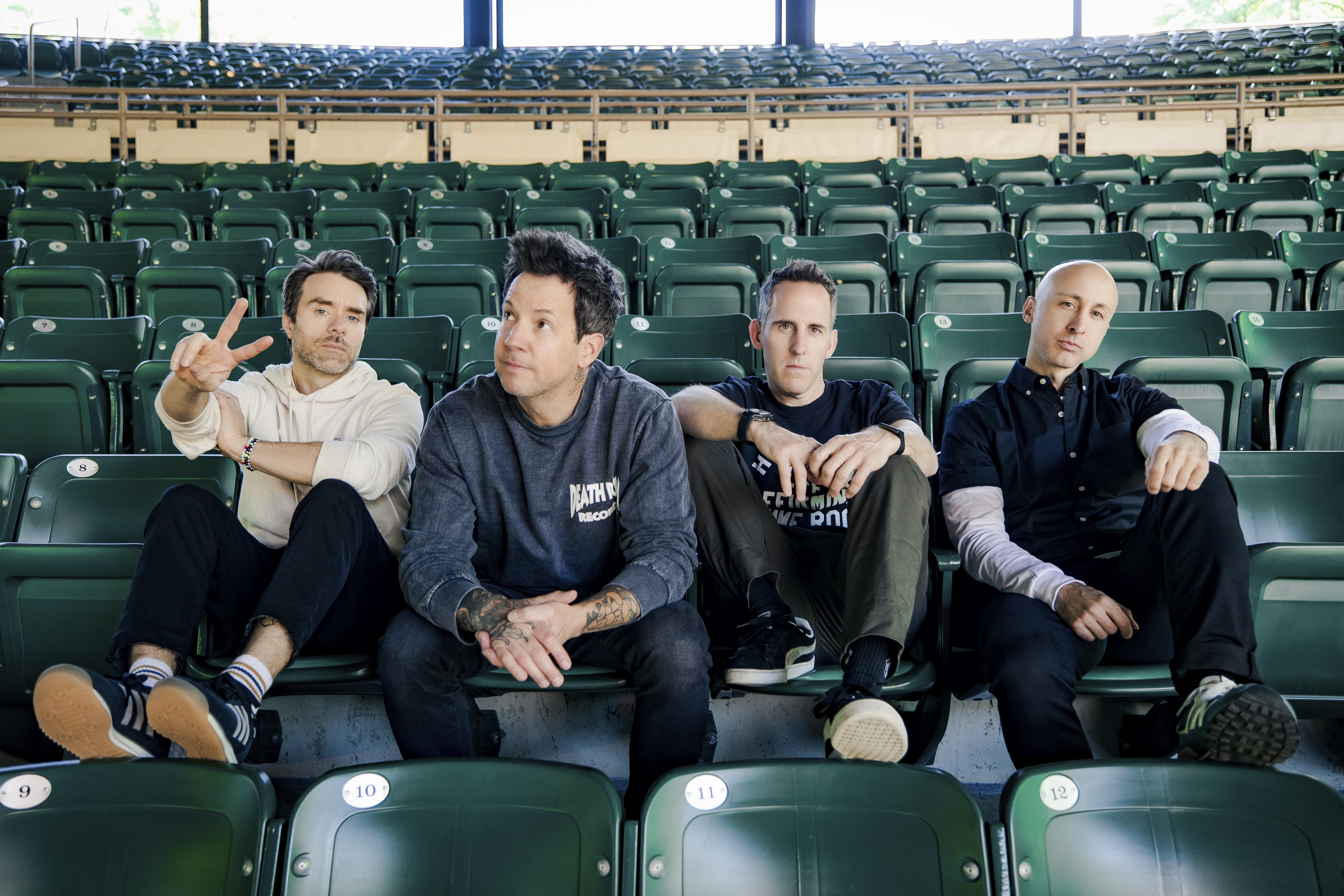
- Left to right: Sébastien Lefebvre, Pierre Bouvier, Chuck Comeau, and Jeff Stinco in 2025.

Background information
- Origin: Montreal, Quebec, Canada
- Genres: Pop-punk; alternative rock; pop rock; power pop; emo
- Works: Simple Plan discography
- Years active: 1999–present
- Labels: Lava; Atlantic; Simple Plan
- Spinoff of: Reset
- Members: Pierre Bouvier; Chuck Comeau; Jeff Stinco; Sébastien Lefebvre
- Past members: David Desrosiers
- Website: officialsimpleplan.com

Simple Plan is a Canadian rock band formed in Montreal, Quebec, in 1999. The band's current lineup consists of Pierre Bouvier (lead vocals, studio bass guitar), Chuck Comeau (drums), Jeff Stinco (lead guitar), and Sébastien Lefebvre (rhythm guitar, backing vocals).

The band has released six studio albums: No Pads, No Helmets...Just Balls (2002), Still Not Getting Any... (2004), Simple Plan (2008), Get Your Heart On! (2011), Taking One for the Team (2016), and Harder Than It Looks (2022). The band has also released an EP titled Get Your Heart On – The Second Coming! (2013), in addition to two live albums: Live in Japan 2002 (2003) and MTV Hard Rock Live (2005).

The band performed at the Vans Warped Tour every year from 1999 to 2005, and in 2011, 2013, 2015, and 2018 and 2026. The band also performed at the 2010 Winter Olympics closing ceremony in Vancouver, along with The X Factor Australia. In December 2012, the band performed at Mood Indigo, the college festival of IIT Bombay in Mumbai, India. In 2004, the band appeared as themselves in the film New York Minute, starring Mary-Kate and Ashley Olsen. Simple Plan also performed "O Canada" at the 2016 NHL Winter Classic. Additionally, they performed the theme music for, and were featured on an episode of, What's New, Scooby-Doo?.

== History ==
=== Background ===
Prior to forming Simple Plan, in 1993, Reset was formed by lead vocalist Pierre Bouvier and drummer Chuck Comeau when they were 13 years old. The original band members were Bouvier, guitarist Philippe Jolicoeur, Comeau, and bassist Jean-Sébastien Boileau. The original name for the band was Roach, but as another Canadian band was using this name, the band members decided to change theirs to Reset. The band's first full-length album, No Worries, released in 1997. In 1998, the band lineup changed; Comeau was unhappy with the musical direction and eventually left the group to go to college. Bouvier took Boileau's place in playing bass and a new member, Adrian White from Vancouver, replaced Comeau as drummer.

=== 1999–2001: early years ===
In mid-1999, he met with high school friends and guitarists Jeff Stinco and Sébastien Lefebvre who were in separate bands of their own. Comeau, Stinco, and Lefebvre formed a new band together. Bouvier was growing tired of being both a singer and a bassist; in late 1999, Bouvier and Comeau reacquainted at a Sugar Ray concert to join Comeau in the band. For some time, Bouvier switched between the new group and Reset, before ultimately leaving the latter. Bassist David Desrosiers briefly filled Bouvier's position in Reset, which impressed Bouvier and Comeau. Desrosiers was interested in joining another band when he was asked to join the new outfit. He too left the band six months later to join the then-unnamed band. This allowed Bouvier, who had doubled as the band's lead vocalist and bassist, to concentrate on singing, and Stinco, who had doubled as the band's lead guitarist and backing vocalist, to concentrate on guitar.

Originally, the band did not have the name. At first, they considered naming the band Touchdown 999; later Bouvier's friends chose the name Simple Plan, derived from the 1998 film A Simple Plan.

In 2001, Simple Plan performed at Edgefest II in Toronto and the Warped Tour. The band rehearsed material at Rumble Fish Studios, before recording at Arnyard Studios in Toronto, Ontario with producer Arnold Lanni. Partway through the recording sessions, they signed to major label Atlantic Records in October 2001.

=== 2002–2005: No Pads, No Helmets...Just Balls and Still Not Getting Any... ===
In 2002, Simple Plan released their debut studio album, No Pads, No Helmets...Just Balls, which featured the singles "I'm Just a Kid", "I'd Do Anything", "Addicted", and "Perfect". The band was aiming for a pure pop-punk record. The record was originally released in the United States with 12 tracks, ending with "Perfect". Enhanced and foreign editions came in several different versions with up to two additional tracks in addition to the original 12. Two pop punk singers contributed on vocals: Mark Hoppus from Blink-182 on "I'd Do Anything" and included vocals by Joel Madden from Good Charlotte on "You Don't Mean Anything." The years of 2002 and 2003 were formative for the band. MTV Networks featured "Addicted" on one of their top performing shows during the spring of 2003 in the United States and internationally; on MTV and MTVu, and was filmed at the University at Buffalo (SUNY Buffalo) in Western New York. Addicted was the theme song for Fraternity Life. While the show was taken off the air the following season the band continued to rise on the billboard charts in the United States and performances continued to be booked and reruns of the show played around the world.

In 2002, the band also performed and recorded the theme song for a rebooted installment of the Scooby-Doo franchise, What's New, Scooby-Doo?. This show used the band's intro throughout its entire run until its conclusion in 2006. It also featured many of the band's songs within episodes of the show, including "I'd Do Anything". The band also starred as themselves in the Season 2 episode "Simple Plan and the Invisible Madman".

In 2003, the band played as a headliner on the Vans Warped Tour — an appearance memorialized in the comedy slasher film, Punk Rock Holocaust, in which four of the five band members are killed. The band also played short stints on the Warped Tour in 2004 and 2005. That same year (2003) the band opened for Avril Lavigne on her Try To Shut Me Up Tour. In addition to several headlining tours, the band has also opened for Green Day and Good Charlotte. The album had sold one million copies in early 2003 then went on to sell over four million copies worldwide, making it the band's best selling album to date.

In 2004, Simple Plan released its second album, Still Not Getting Any... which was produced by Bob Rock and led to the subsequent singles, "Welcome to My Life", "Shut Up", "Untitled (How Could This Happen to Me?)", "Crazy", and (in some markets) "Perfect World".

According to the album's bonus DVD, the band originally considered other names for it like Get Rich or Die Trying, Enema of the State, and In The Zone before deciding on Still Not Getting Any.... The name stemmed from the band's belief that they were not getting any good reviews, with Bouvier once noting that the band only had one recent good review in Alternative Press. Still Not Getting Any... was a musical departure from the group's previous album: the band retained its style of downbeat lyrics matched to upbeat music, but managed to transcend from the standard pop punk genre. Although many of the tracks on this CD still carried the feeling of teen angst that is probably most noticeable in "I'm Just a Kid" from No Pads, No Helmets...Just Balls, the general slant of this album tends toward slightly deeper and more mature lyrical themes, as well as a more mainstream sound that edges away from the pure pop punk style of the group's last album. Some critics have pointed towards the inclusion of "classic" or "mainstream" rock elements, claiming the album "de-emphasizes punk-pop hyperactivity in favor of straightforward, well-crafted modern rock".

In 2005, their cover version of Cheap Trick's "Surrender" was featured in the soundtrack album for the superhero film, Fantastic Four.

On September 11, 2005, Bouvier was hit by a water bottle while performing "Welcome to My Life" at the Ovation Music Festival in Stratford, Ontario. He stumbled off the stage and was taken to a nearby hospital shortly after, where he received an undiclosed number of stitches. The band finished the song with an audience member as an impromptu guest singer and cut the concert short. The injury forced the band to cancel their appearance at a ReAct Now: Music & Relief benefit concert for Hurricane Katrina victims the following night. In a separate incident, Comeau was hit in the face by a glass bottle during a concert in Detroit, which required four stitches to his nose/mouth area. Sometime afterwards, they went on a South American tour.

=== 2006–2009: Simple Plan ===
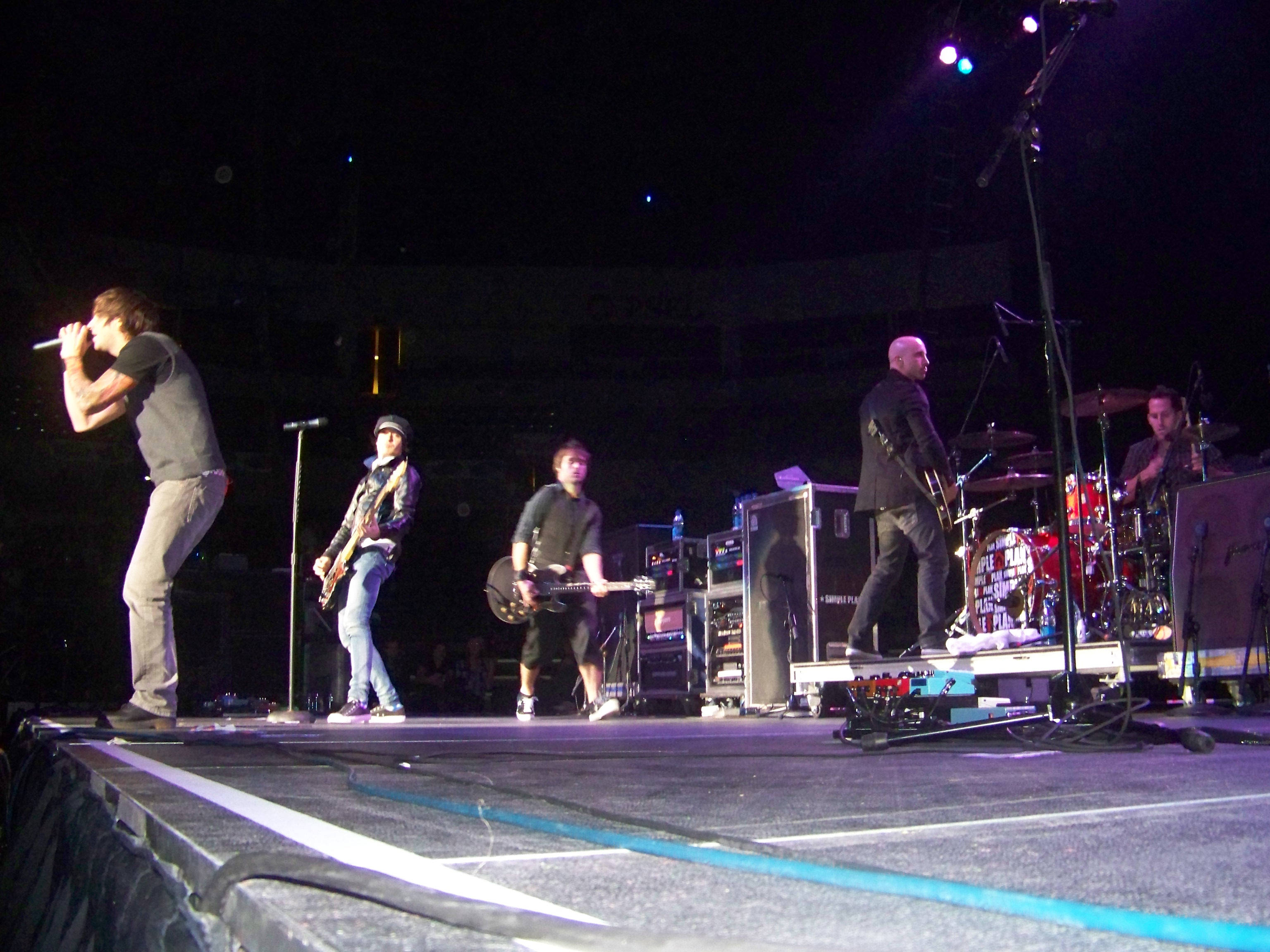
The band in concert in Trenton, NJ, December 2007

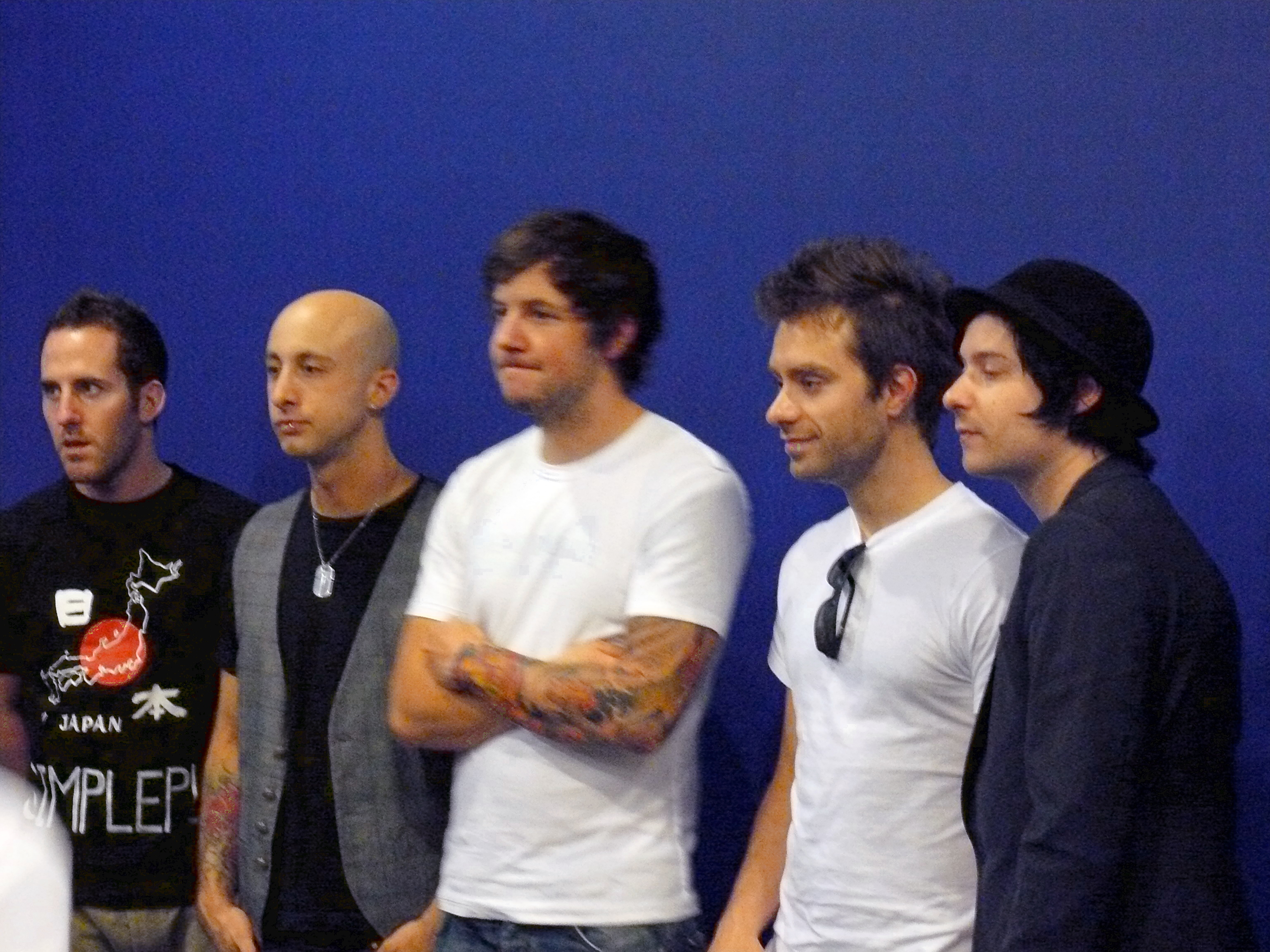
Simple Plan in Osaka in 2009. From left to right: Chuck Comeau, Jeff Stinco, Pierre Bouvier, Sébastien Lefebvre, and David Desrosiers

After nearly a year and a half in support of Still Not Getting Any..., the band ended most touring in February 2006. They were playing only a few shows, taking some time off, and beginning work on the third studio album. Bouvier headed to Miami as on about 21 March 2007 to work with Dave Fortman. The band entered the studio for pre-production in Los Angeles on 29 June. On 15 July the band returned to Montréal to record at Studio Piccolo, the same studio in which the band had recorded Still Not Getting Any.... The band finished recording and headed back to Miami and Los Angeles to mix the album. The final part of making the record was done in New York City, and it was officially completed on 21 October.

When I'm Gone, the first single from Simple Plan, was released on 29 October. This album was produced by both Dave Fortman and Max Martin. On 17 February 2008, the band achieved its highest-charting single in the U.K. After the first two albums just missed the UK top 40, "When I'm Gone" gave the band its best chart position in the UK, coming in at number 26.

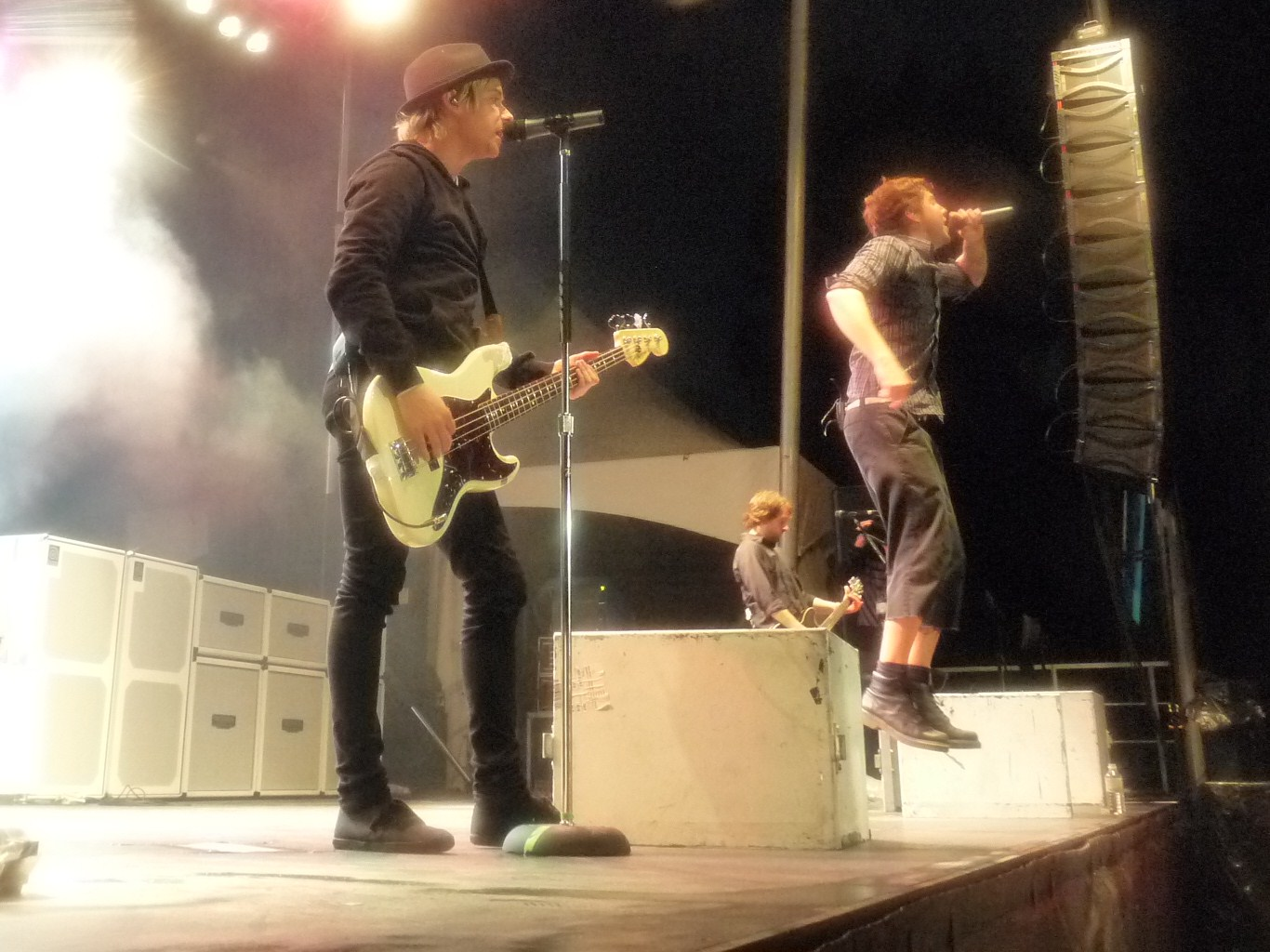
(L–R) Bassist David Desrosiers, rhythm guitarist Sébastien Lefebvre, and lead vocalist Pierre Bouvier performing in Shawinigan-Sud, Quebec, June 2009

Simple Plan held an extensive tour schedule in support of the album. After completing an around-the-world promotional tour, they played several holiday shows during December 2007. After they continued promotional tours in January, Simple Plan played a triple bill in Camden Town, London on 27 January 2008, with the first show featuring songs from the band's first CD, the second from the second, and the third from the new release. The band played four U.S. shows in late February, and completed a European tour running until late April. The band played four Japan dates, followed by several European festivals and headlining dates. On 1 July 2008, the band gave a free concert on Québec City's Plains of Abraham, attracting a crowd of 150,000 people to the Canada Day show. After a return to the Far East in late July and early August, the band played a Cross Canada Tour with Faber Drive, Cute is What We Aim For and Metro Station. After dates in Germany, Mexico, and Australia, the band played its second full European tour of the year from 28 October to 29 November, playing in Estonia and Poland for the first time. The band also played in Tel Aviv and Dubai in early December—shows at which the band played as a four-piece, with Desrosiers absent due to a family emergency and Lefebvre on bass.

=== 2010–2013: Get Your Heart On! ===
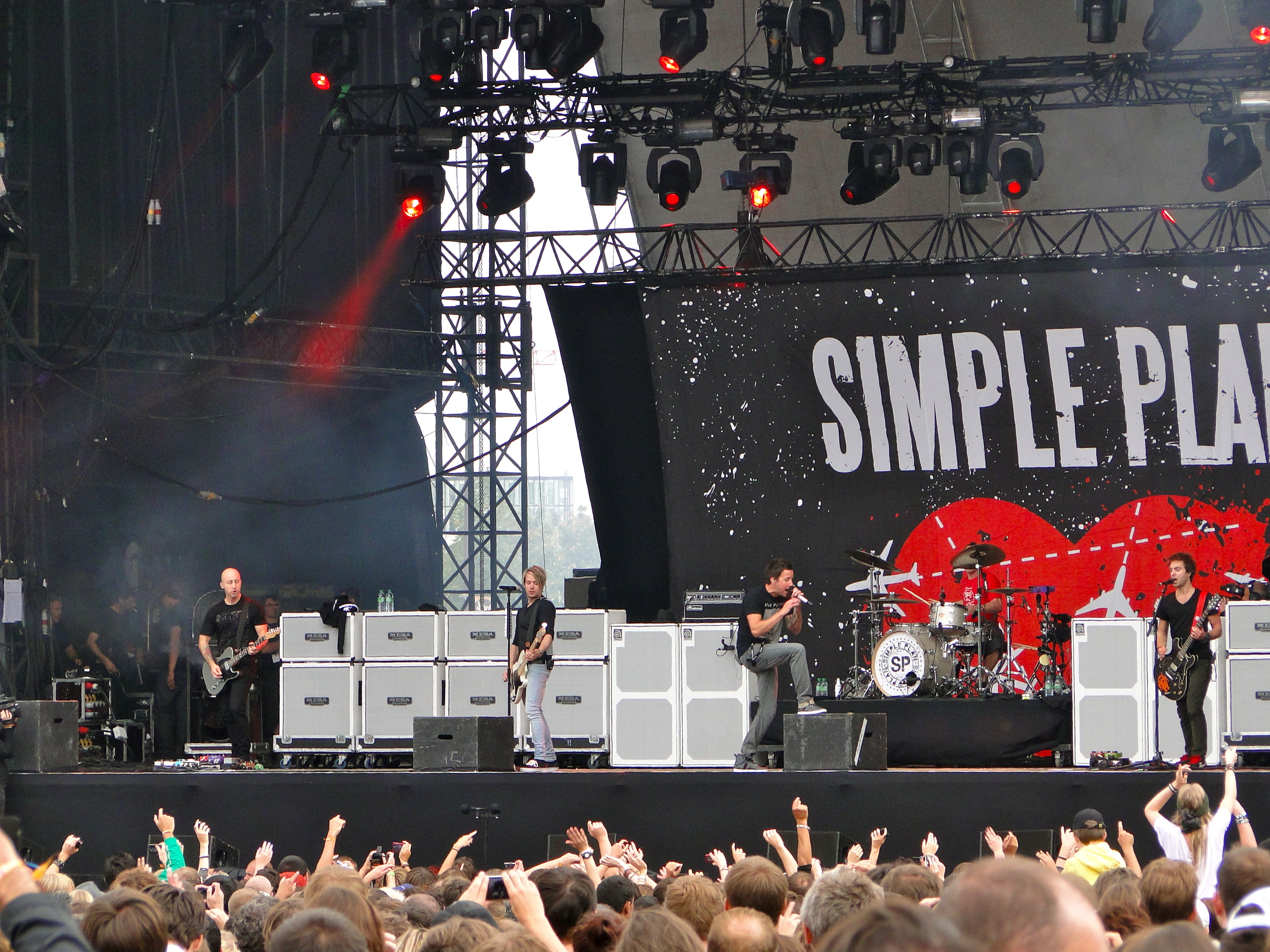
Simple Plan performing in Paris in 2011

The band's fourth album Get Your Heart On! was released on 21 June 2011. The album marks Simple Plan's second time since No Pads, No Helmets...Just Balls to feature collaborations with other artists, including Weezer's Rivers Cuomo, Marie-Mai, Natasha Bedingfield, K'naan and Alex Gaskarth of All Time Low. In April, "Jet Lag" was released in English and French versions featuring singers Natasha Bedingfield and Marie-Mai respectively. The band was on the roster of Warped Tour 2011 for selected dates in June and July 2011.

In September and October 2011, Simple Plan performed four shows in Australia, on the "Get Your Heart On" tour, with supporting bands Tonight Alive and New Empire. During the Australian tour, Jenna McDougall from Tonight Alive featured in "Jet Lag". We the Kings supported Simple Plan in Europe on a tour in spring 2012. The song "Last One Standing" was featured on the NASCAR The Game: Inside Line soundtrack. Simple Plan also performed live with the Montreal Symphony Orchestra at Montreal Symphony House in Montréal, Quebec, Canada on 20 September 2011, raising over $500,000 for sick children and young people in need.

An EP titled Get Your Heart On – The Second Coming! was released on 3 December. Consequently, Simple Plan uploaded the DVD, directed by Peter John from Epik Films and shot by Peter John for the official Simple Plan YouTube channel, in high quality for free as a gift to the fans.

=== 2014–2016: Taking One for the Team ===
In March 2014, when the band members started recording the first demos for the album, it was announced through My Chemical Romance rhythm guitarist Frank Iero's Instagram that Iero is working with Simple Plan on the next album. This information was later confirmed by Comeau; the band estimated to release the album in the second half of 2015, plus the band discussed the band's future projects. On 30 July 2014, the band formally stated that the music writing for the next album had begun. In December 2014, Simple Plan started to choose which songs would be included on the album. "Saturday", was released on 21 June 2015, although the band stated this song would not be in the album.

In April 2015, Simple Plan performed with up-and-coming Canadian singer Andee at the FIFA Women's World Cup Trophy Tour in Toronto. The band also toured on the 2015 Vans Warped Tour, performing a total of five shows.

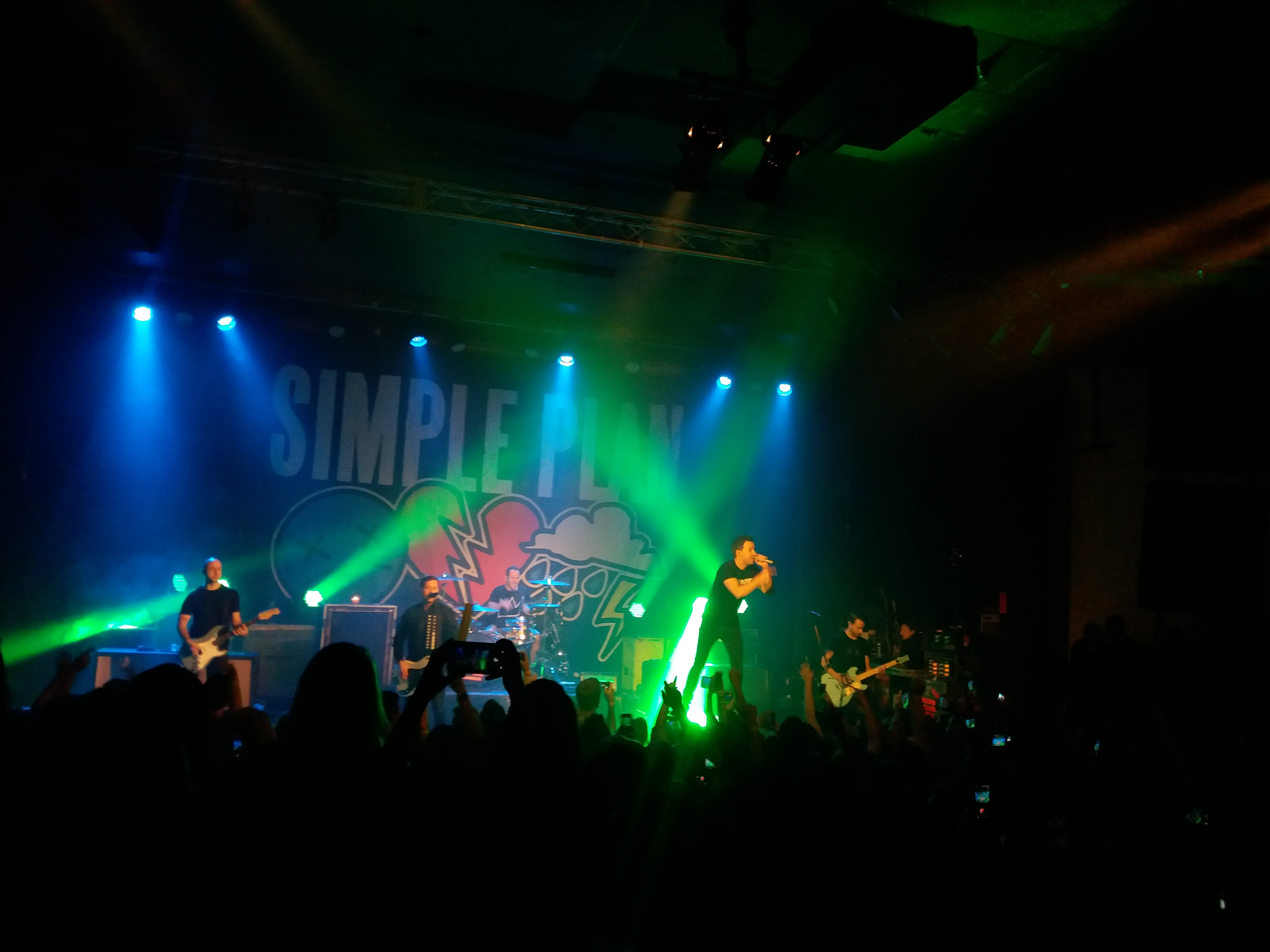
Simple Plan playing live in 2017.

On 28 August 2015, the band released "Boom", a song from the upcoming fifth album. On the same day, a music video was released for the song, which contains footage from the 2015 Vans Warped Tour, The Alternative Press Music Awards, and a performance in Montreal at New City Gas; the video contains cameos from members of the bands MxPx, All Time Low, New Found Glory, PVRIS, Pierce the Veil, The Summer Set, Silverstein, Black Veil Brides, Parkway Drive and Issues.

On 18 September 2015, the band released a second song from the fifth studio album, "I Don't Wanna Be Sad," and a third called "I Don't Wanna Go to Bed," featuring rapper Nelly on 16 October 2015. On 30 November 2015, the band revealed the title of the album would be Taking One for the Team. The group set the release date for 19 February 2016, along with the album cover and the first tour dates of the Taking One for the Team Tour, with shows scheduled in European countries.

In 2016, the band performed at the NHL Winter Classic at Gillette Stadium against the Montreal Canadiens and Boston Bruins. They performed "O Canada" during the pregame and also performed during the second intermission.

"Opinion Overload", the second single from Taking One for the Team was released on 5 February 2016. Simple Plan released their third single "Singing in the Rain" internationally on 12 April. The album was released on 19 February 2016. It was described as a "pure, no-frills, feel-good fun, a start-to-finish crowd-pleaser for fans of that classic pop-punk sound." On 5 December, Simple Plan released "Christmas Everyday", 15 years after their last Christmas song and first single, "My Christmas List".

=== 2017–2025: David Desrosiers' departure and Harder Than It Looks ===
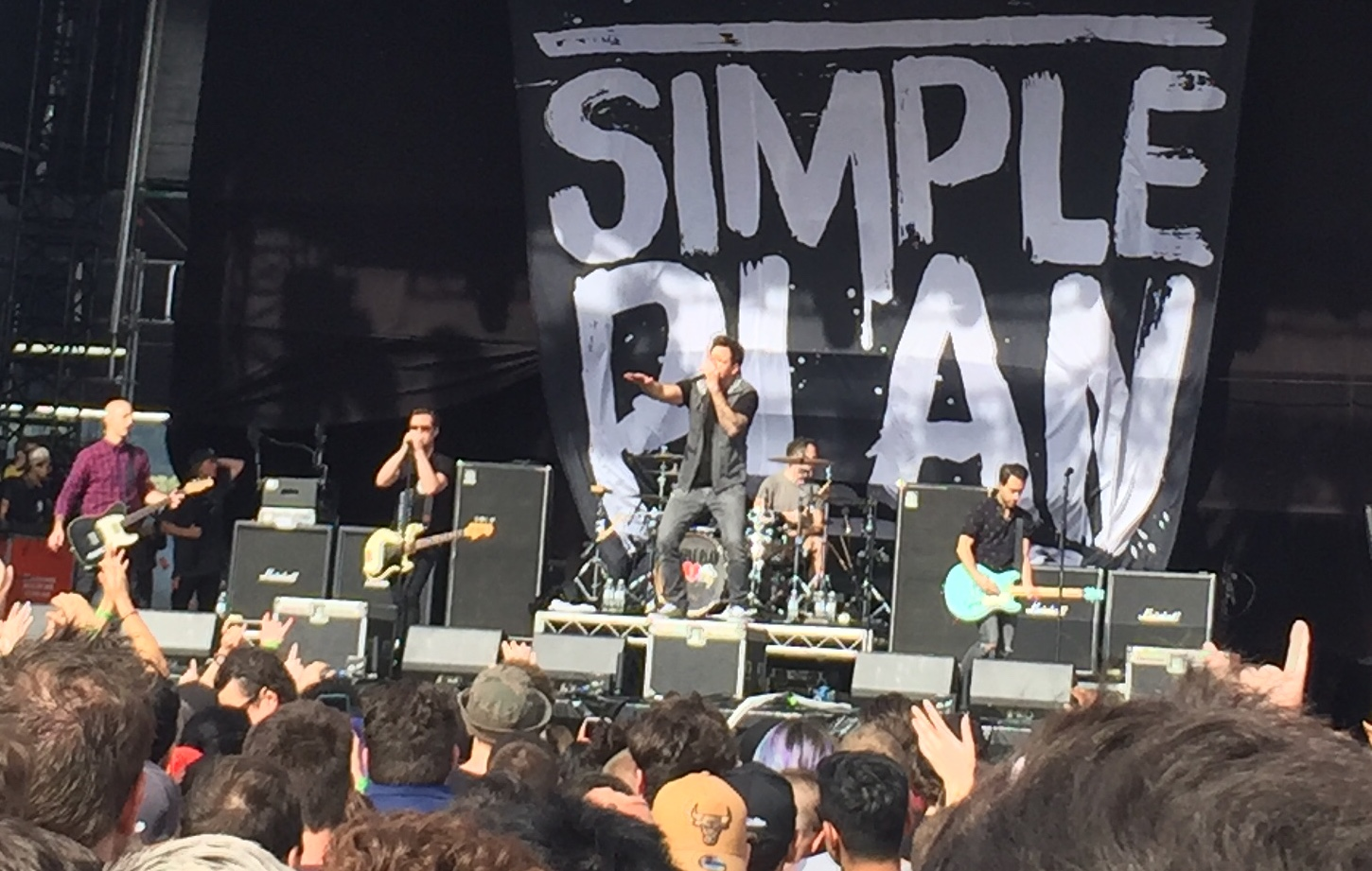
Simple Plan live at Good Things Festival Melbourne (2019)

In 2017, the band embarked on a tour called No Pads, No Helmets...Just Balls (15th Anniversary Tour Edition) in support of the album in question's anniversary, during which they played the entire album front to back during each show. From May 2017 until June 2019, David Desrosiers had been on hiatus from touring with Simple Plan, while he was at home recovering from depression. During that time, a touring musician named Chady Awad had been performing bass with the band as a touring substitute for more than two years, while Bouvier and Lefebvre had divided Desrosiers' vocal parts. This marks the second time Desrosiers has been absent from the band; the first time was in December 2008, when Lefebvre temporarily switched to bass for 2 weeks during live performances.

In September 2017, while interviewed by Purdue University, Jeff Stinco revealed that the band would start working on their new album in early 2018.

On 5 September 2018, Music in Minnesota reported that members of Simple Plan spent a day in Owatonna, Minnesota, to appear in scenes of a punk rock musical titled Summertime Dropouts. The feature film was released in the fall of 2019. Simple Plan recorded a song called "Bigger", which was released on the soundtrack of the film La course des Tuques on 16 November 2018.

On 8 June 2019, the band reunited with Desrosiers in Cleveland, Ohio, marking his official return to the band. On 2 September 2019, Pierre Bouvier revealed that the band had fulfilled their contract to Atlantic and were now free agents and hinted at releasing new music later in the year.

In October 2019, Simple Plan released a collaboration track with State Champs and We the Kings called "Where I Belong"; the three also conducted a tour together.

On 10 July 2020, it was announced that Desrosiers had parted ways with the band a third time after being accused of sexual misconduct on social media. Their touring bassist Chady Awad also left the band over similar allegations five days later. Rather than replacing Desrosiers and Awad, Bouvier himself took over on bass.

On July 22, 2021, the band re-recorded the What's New, Scooby-Doo? theme song and made it available for streaming.

On November 5, 2021, the band released "The Antidote", the first single from their sixth album. It was their first self-released album, distributed by The Orchard. On February 18, 2022, the band released the single "Ruin My Life", featuring vocals from Deryck Whibley of Sum 41. On February 22, 2022, the band announced a U.S. tour with Sum 41 called the Blame Canada tour set to run from April to August 2022. On March 15, 2022, the band announced the release of their sixth studio album Harder Than It Looks with a release of the third promotional single "Congratulations". On April 8, 2022, the band released the album's fourth single, "Wake Me Up (When This Nightmare's Over)". The album was released on May 6, 2022, to positive reception, reaching No. 84 Canadian Albums, #55 Top Current Album Sales (US), and #90 Top Album Sales (US) on the Billboard Charts.

Simple Plan started the "Blame Canada" tour on April 29, 2022, and on May 16, 2022, Simple Plan announced they would be continuing their tour with Sum 41 with a European tour beginning September 2022.

In November 2022, Simple Plan released an updated version of "I'm Just a Kid", featuring LØLØ.

In August 2023, Simple Plan embarked on the “Let the Bad Times Roll” 2023 Summer tour, with Sum 41 and The Offspring. It was 24 dates and spanned across the US. Around this time, they also announced a Mexico tour, 4 dates across Mexico in the Fall of 2023, and a European 21 date tour for Winter 2024, starting in Paris and ending in England.

In October 2023, Simple Plan released a new version of "Iconic", featuring Jax.

Simple Plan performed many times in 2024, including the When We Were Young Fest in Las Vegas and their Hard As Rock Tour, throughout the UK and Europe. In March 2024, the band headlined the I Wanna Be Tour in Brasil with support from NX Zero. In April, they toured Australia with Boys Like Girls, We the Kings, and special guest, Jax. Starting in August 2024, the band went on tour with Avril Lavigne supporting her 'Greatest Hits' Tour.

On July 12, 2024, the band released a pop-punk cover of "Can You Feel the Love Tonight" by Elton John, from the 1994 film The Lion King. It was also announced that it would be part of Disney's pop-punk covers album, titled A Whole New Sound.

On July 25, 2024, the Simple Plan special edition box set became available for pre order. The set contains the band's six studio albums and marks the band's 25th anniversary. The sets are a limited run with 1500 sets produced and each set is signed by the band.

On July 13, 2024, following a show with Avril Lavigne at Scotiabank Arena on July 12, Simple Plan played a surprise pop up show at Toronto's Union station.

On October 19, 2024, during their WWWY set, Simple Plan announced they will be the subject of a forthcoming documentary on Prime Video, which is slated to debut sometime in 2025. Didier Charette is directing, and the film is currently in production with Sphere Media.

=== 2025: The Kids in the Crowd and new music ===
On February 25, 2025, Simple Plan announced the Bigger Than You Think! U.S. headline tour to celebrate their 25th anniversary. Between August to September, the band will be touring across 19 cities with special guests 3OH!3, Bowling for Soup, and LØLØ.

On May 9, 2025, Simple Plan were featured on Avril Lavigne's single "Young & Dumb". Simple Plan and Lavigne had first toured together on Lavigne's first tour, the Try To Shut Me Up Tour, from 2002 until its conclusion in 2003, which served as the inspiration for the song.

On July 6, 2025, The band released a documentary about their history as a band titled Simple Plan: The Kids in the Crowd. On July 11, 2025, The band released a soundtrack to The Kids in the Crowd featuring an unreleased song titled "Nothing Changes" along with a bunch of fan favorites and early demos.

The band was confirmed to be appearing at Welcome to Rockville, which place in Daytona Beach, Florida in May 2026.

On February 10, 2026, Simple Plan announced the Bigger Than You Think! U.S. headline tour, The Sequel! Between July to August, the band will be touring across 19 cities with special guests Bowling for Soup and 3OH!3. On the first day of the Canadian leg of the tour, the three bands were also joined by Marianas Trench in Toronto on August 20.

In October of 2026, the band began touring across 21 countries in Europe, with stops in the United Kingdom, Germany, Spain, France, and more.

== Musical style and legacy ==
Simple Plan's musical style has been described as pop-punk, alternative rock, pop rock, power pop, emo, and punk rock. Atlantic Records marketing material has described the band's style as having "classic punk energy and modern pop sonics".

In 2013, the staff of OC Weekly ranked Simple Plan fifth on its list of the "Top 10 Worst Emo Bands Of All Time". They wrote: "Definitely the cheesiest band on the list, Simple Plan was written for not even high school listeners, but middle school listeners."

== Simple Plan Foundation ==
Simple Plan Foundation

The members of Simple Plan created the Simple Plan Foundation in 2005, which focuses on teen problems ranging from suicide to poverty to drug addiction. As of November 2024, the Simple Plan Foundation has raised and donated nearly $3,000,000.

A fundraising event was held in September 2009 in Montréal. In October 2008, the band announced a special release on iTunes of the single "Save You", to benefit the Foundation, with a special composite video featuring cancer survivors. The song was inspired by the struggle with cancer of Bouvier's brother Jay.

On 15 March 2011, the Foundation stated it would donate $10,000 in aid after the 2011 earthquake that hit Japan.

In 2012, to mark the band's 10th anniversary, the book Simple Plan: The Official Story was released, which was used as a fundraiser for the Simple Plan Foundation.

In March 2024, the foundation donated US$10,000 to help support residents of Rio Grande do Sul after a flood. They also sold a Brazil specific merch T-shirt, from which the proceeds will go towards the flood victims.

== Band members ==
Current

- Pierre Bouvier – lead vocals (1999–present); bass (1999–2000; touring 2008; studio 2020–present); acoustic guitar and percussion (2000–present)
- Chuck Comeau – drums, percussion (1999–present)
- Jeff Stinco – lead guitar (1999–present)
- Sébastien Lefebvre – rhythm guitar, backing vocals (1999–present); bass (touring 2008, 2016)

Former

- David Desrosiers – bass, backing and occasional lead vocals, additional percussion (2000–2020; hiatus 2008, 2016, 2017–2019)

Touring

- Chady Awad – bass, backing vocals (2016, 2017–2019, 2020)
- Nicholas Kennedy – bass (2021–present)

Timeline

== Discography ==
Studio albums

- No Pads, No Helmets...Just Balls (2002)
- Still Not Getting Any... (2004)
- Simple Plan (2008)
- Get Your Heart On! (2011)
- Taking One for the Team (2016)
- Harder Than It Looks (2022)

== Awards and nominations ==
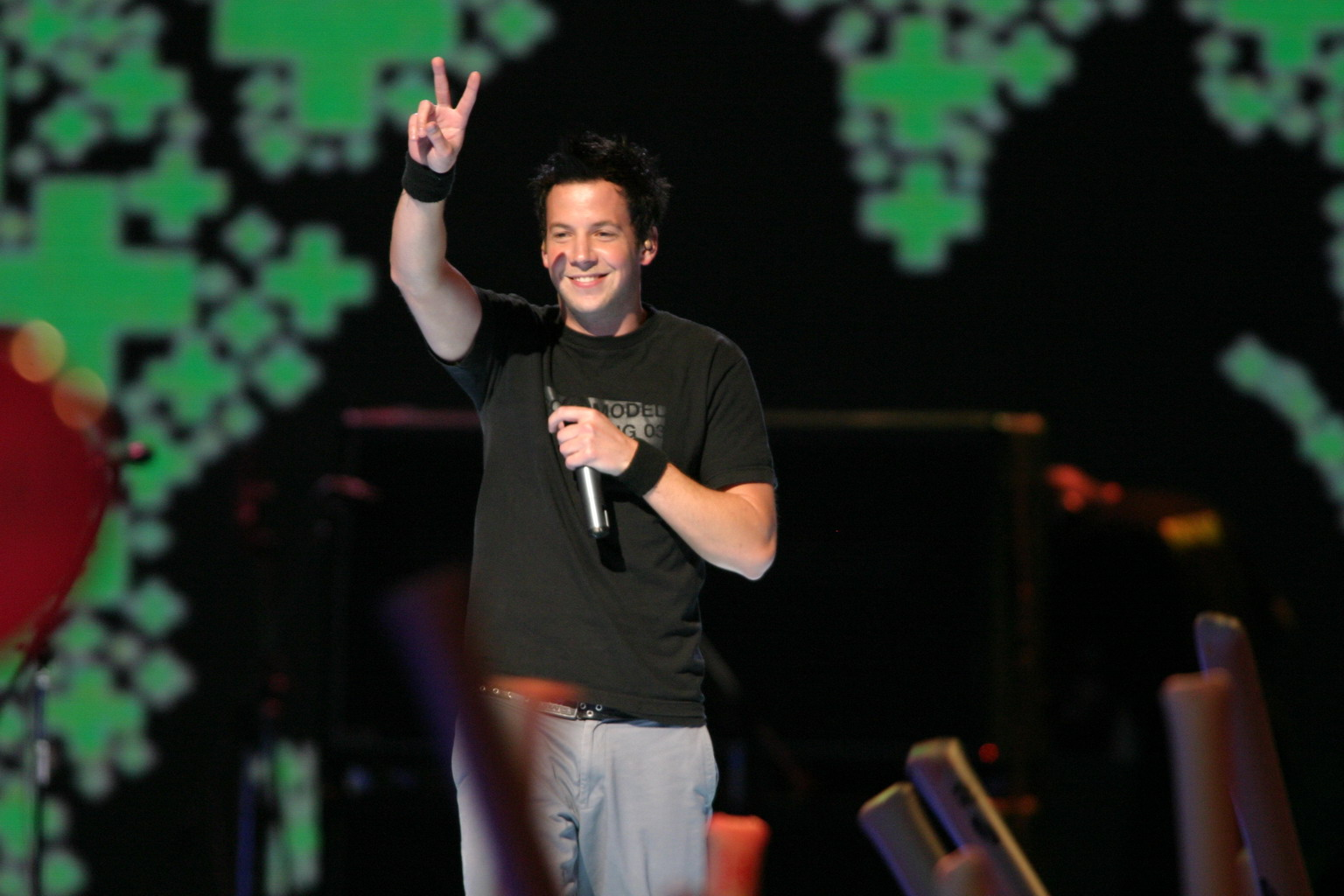
Pierre Bouvier performing with Simple Plan in 2007

Radio Canada/La Presse Awards

- 2013 Nominated for Arts and Entertainment Award

Dahsyatnya Awards

- 2013 Nominated for Outstanding Guest Star

CASBY Awards

- 2002 Won CASBY Award

Juno Awards

- 2012 Won Allan Waters Humanitarian Award
- 2009 Nominated for Juno Award
- 2009 Nominated for Juno Award (for the group itself)
- 2006 Won Juno Fan Choice Award
- 2005 Nominated for Juno Award
- 2005 Nominated for Juno Award
- 2005 Nominated for Juno Award

Kerrang! Awards

- 2008 Nominated for Kerrang! Award

MTV Asia Awards

- 2006 Nominated for Favourite Pop Act

MTV Europe Music Awards

- 2014 Nominated for MTV Europe Music Award (Best World Stage- WS Monterrey)

MTV Video Music Awards

- 2004 Nominated for MTV Video Music Award
- 2003 Nominated for MTV Video Music Award

MuchMusic Video Awards

- 2012 Nominated for MuchMusic Video Award (Best International Video by a Canadian)
- 2012 Nominated for MuchMusic Video Award (UR FAVE VIDEO)
- 2011 Nominated for MuchMusic Video Award
- 2009 Won MuchMusic Video Award
- 2008 Won MuchMusic Video Award
- 2008 Nominated for MuchMusic Video Award
- 2008 Nominated for MuchMusic Video Award
- 2006 Won MuchMusic Video Award
- 2006 Nominated for MuchMusic Video Award
- 2006 Nominated for MuchMusic Video Award
- 2005 Won MuchMusic Video Award
- 2005 Nominated for MuchMusic Video Award
- 2005 Nominated for MuchMusic Video Award
- 2004 Won MuchMusic Video Award
- 2003 Won MuchMusic Video Award

NRJ Music Awards

- 2012 Won NRJ Music Award
- 2007 Nominated for NRJ Music Award

Teen Choice Awards

- 2008 Nominated for Teen Choice Award
- 2005 Nominated for Choice Summer Song ("Untitled (How Could This Happen to Me?)")
- 2005 Won for Choice Rock Group
- 2004 Nominated for Choice Rock Group

ADISQ

- 2006 Won Artiste québécois s'étant le plus illustré hors Québec
- 2006 Won Album de l'année – Anglophone
