= Still Not Getting Any... =

2004 studio album by Simple Plan

Studio album by Simple Plan
- Released: October 26, 2004
- Recorded: Early-to-mid 2004
- Studio: Studio Piccolo
- Genres: Pop-punk; alternative rock
- Length: 37:58
- Label: Lava
- Producer: Bob Rock

Simple Plan chronology
| No Pads, No Helmets...Just Balls (2002) | Still Not Getting Any... (2004) | MTV Hard Rock Live (2005) |

Singles from Still Not Getting Any...
- 1. "Welcome to My Life" Released: September 13, 2004; 2. "Shut Up!" Released: January 25, 2005; 3. "Untitled (How Could This Happen to Me?)" Released: March 29, 2005; 4. "Crazy" Released: October 17, 2005; 5. "Perfect World (Promotional single)" Released: January 1, 2006

Alternate album cover

Still Not Getting Any... is the second studio album by Canadian rock band Simple Plan. It was released on October 26, 2004, by Lava Records. The album garnered a positive reception, but critics were unsure of the band's musicianship and lyricism in their given genre. Still Not Getting Any... debuted at number 3 on the US Billboard 200 and spawned four singles: "Welcome to My Life", "Shut Up!", "Untitled (How Could This Happen to Me?)" and "Crazy". It was certified Platinum by the Recording Industry Association of America (RIAA), denoting sales of over one million copies.

== Background and production ==
Simple Plan released their debut album, No Pads, No Helmets...Just Balls, in March 2002 through major labels Lava and Atlantic Records. It was promoted with support slots for Sugar Ray, Blink-182, Green Day and Avril Lavigne, and went on two stints of the Warped Tour, leading up at August 2003. Due to the frequent touring schedule, the band had around three months to write ten new songs for their next album. Drummer Chuck Comeau and vocalist Pierre Bouvier argued frequently as a result of the short time they had. The pair wrote material in Vancouver, Canada, and recorded demos using the Reason software. By the end of the year, they had 10–15 rough ideas for new songs. In January and February 2004, they went on a co-headlining tour with MxPx; after the tour, the band began recording their next album.

Sessions were held at Studio Piccolo in Montreal, Canada, with producer Bob Rock. Him and Eric Helmkamp acted as engineers; Helmkamp and Mathieu Roberge served as digital engineers. Rock explained to the band upon meeting them that he wanted to do "The Black Album, but with our songs", as Bouvier described. He expanded on this, saying the record had a "really clean yet intense and powerful sound." Subsequently, the band went with a bigger and more open drum sound, with Rock using as many as five different microphone placements for the kick drum alone. The band briefly took a break to play two shows in July and August, before finishing the album in September. The recordings were mixed by Randy Staub with assistance from Zach Blackstone at Warehouse Studios in Vancouver, Canada. George Marino mastered the album at Sterling Sound.

== Composition ==
All of the tracks on Still Not Getting Any... were credited to the band. While it has been tagged as pop-punk, the group placed less emphasis on this genre, instead opting for a straightforward rock sound. The band continued the upbeat mood of No Pads, No Helmets...Just Balls with tracks such as "Thank You", "Jump" and "Promise", while "Welcome to My Life", "Perfect World", "Crazy" and "Everytime" were mid-tempo tracks. "One" and "Untitled" were written during the final days of recording. Both songs featured string arrangements by Bob Buckley. Bill Sample played piano on "Untitled"; Desrosiers played additional drums on it. The lyrics, which recalled Linkin Park, conveys the theme of teenage angst.

The opening track "Shut Up!" talks about ignoring critics and following one's dream. "Welcome to My Life" discusses growing up and living one's life. The track is in half-time and was compared to Avril Lavigne. It starts off with acoustic guitars, with power chords coming in during the chorus sections. "Perfect World" continues the half-time signature, before switching into a military-esque drumming pattern and programmed drum rolls. "Thank You" is a sarcastic retort to a back-stabbing best friend. "Me Against the World" was the heaviest song the band had written, which was the result of Bouvier listening to Thrice at the time. The chorus section was cribbed from "Smells Like Teen Spirit" by Nirvana. Bouvier said "Crazy" could've been much longer had they written about more topics, instead talking about the money gap between rich and poor people, the objectification of women in the media, and the stereotypes they're expected to live up to.

"Jump" evokes the song of the same name by Van Halen while also sounding like Sum 41. Comeau said it was in the vein of 311, and is followed by the Ryan Adams-indebted "Everytime". "One" discusses the topic of alienation; the guitars are played alongside a violin section. Its title is taken from the Metallica track of the same name.The band initially disliked the first version of the song, before rewriting it with a dancehall-like rhythm influenced by Sean Paul. The closing track "Untitled" is a ballad in the vein of Foreigner. The band called it "Untitled" simply as they were unable to come up with anything else. It is anchored by a piano and opens with a string section.

== Release ==
While recording was still underway, Still Not Getting Any... was announced on August 20, 2004, for release in October. "Welcome to My Life" was made available for streaming through AOL.com on September 6, before being sent to radio on September 13. The CD version included live versions of "Addicted" and "The Worst Day Ever". Still Not Getting Any... was released on October 26 through Lava Records; the same day it was made available for streaming through MTV's website. The artwork sees the band sitting in the back of a bus; some versions used alternative covers with the members in their 40s or in a retirement home. The booklet continues this theme: the band becoming progressively older, accomplished via prosthetics and makeup.

Some copies were released with a bonus DVD or a DualDisc, which included the whole album in 5.1 surround sound, a discography listing, lyrics and photos. An outtake from the recording sessions, "If I Die Tomorrow", was recorded by Mötley Crüe and released on their Red, White & Crüe (2005) compilation.

A music video was filmed for "Shut Up!" in December with director by Erik White. It features the band walking to a gig, passing through an upscale neighborhood and a hotel. The members perform in a ballroom, jump from tables and destroy ice sculptures, which shifts to them performing at a club. "Shut Up! was released as a single on January 25, 2005. The CD version included an acoustic version of "Welcome to My Life" and live version of "I'd Do Anything".

"Untitled", now re-titled "Untitled (How Could This Happen to Me?)", was released as a single on March 29, 2005. The CD version included live versions of "Welcome to My Life" and "Jump". The song's music video was directed by Marc Klasfeld and tackles the issue of drunk driving. Bouvier acts as a ghost walking around the remains of a two-car collision. With rain pouring down, a girl is shown trapped against the steering wheel. The other members of the band show up as police and EMTs as they attempt to free the girl. It was promoted with the band appearing in several public service announcements for Mothers Against Drunk Driving.

On October 4, 2005, the band release the live/video album MTV Hard Rock Live, which featured acoustic versions of "Welcome to My Life" and "Crazy" as bonus tracks. "Crazy" was released as a single on October 17. The CD version included a live version of "Crazy", and MTV performances of "Shut Up!" and "I'd Do Anything". The music video for the song was filmed earlier in September in Los Angeles, California with Klasfeld directing again. The clip, filmed in black-and-white shows instances of real-life suffering: a man dying from AIDS, a girl with anorexia, a soldier missing some of his limbs, among others. The album was included in a package with Get Your Heart On! (2011) in 2013.

== Touring ==
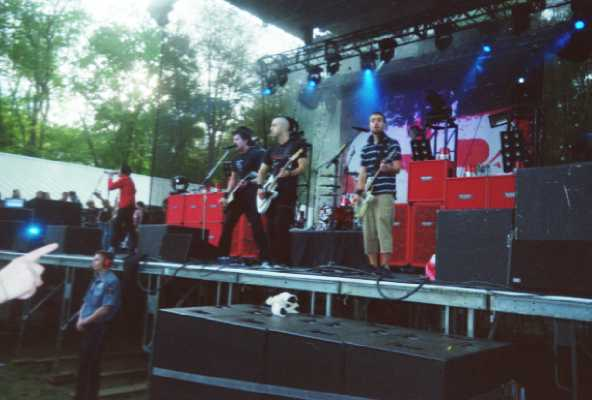
Simple Plan performing live in 2005

Prior to the release of Still Not Getting Any..., the band supported Avril Lavigne on a European tour. Following its release, the group went on a club tour, which was followed by headlining radio festivals throughout December 2004. In the same month, the band performed on MuchMusic. From January to April 2005, the band toured across the UK, New Zealand, Australia and Japan. They visited Europe for a few weeks worth of publicity, before returning to the US. In May and June, the group went on a co-headlining US tour with Good Charlotte, dubbed the Noise to the World tour. They were supported by Relient K. Between June and August, the group appeared at the Grand Prix F1 Weekend, supported Green Day for two shows in the UK. performed as part of the Canadian branch of Live 8, and played "Untitled" on the 2005 Teen Choice Awards.

After appearing on three dates at Warped Tour, the band toured Japan, the UK, Australia and China, which included an appearance at the Reading and Leeds Festivals. During a hometown show in September, Bouvier was injured by the crowd throwing bottles, and as a result, the band were forced to cancel an appearance at a benefit concert for victims of Hurricane Katrina. Sometime afterwards, they went on a South American tour. In October and November, the group went on a US tour, with support from Straylight Run, Plain White T's and Paramore. Prior to the start of the trek, the group were in Mexico when Hurricane Wilma hit, resulting in them being evacuated, but leaving their equipment behind. Subsequently, they had to rent gear and their stage show lacked props. The band closed the year with their first ever cross-country Canadian tour in November and December 2005 with support from the Planet Smashers. The group went on their final supporting tour for the album in February 2006, during a stint of the UK.

== Critical reception ==
Professional ratings
Aggregate scores
| Source | Rating |
|---|---|
| Metacritic | 66/100 |
Review scores
| Source | Rating |
| AllMusic | 3.5/5 stars |
| Alternative Press | 4/5 stars |
| Blender | 3/5 stars |
| Classic Rock | 4/5 stars |
| E! | B |
| Entertainment Weekly | B+ |
| Q | 3/5 stars |
| Rolling Stone | 3/5 stars |
| Spin | C− |
| Sputnikmusic | 3.5/5 |

Still Not Getting Any... received generally positive reviews, receiving praise for its production and catchy choruses, but music critics were still questioning the band's musical talent in terms of lyrics and instrumentation in their given genre. At Metacritic, which assigns a normalized rating out of 100 to reviews from mainstream critics, the album received an average score of 66, based on 9 reviews.

Johnny Loftus of AllMusic commended the band for shifting their teenage ennui material from pop-punk to a more modern rock sound that shows maturity in their lyrics, concluding that "As Still Not Getting Any...'s title and rowdier moments prove, they can still bring the spunky crowd-pleasers. But it's the album's less raucous and more thoughtful side that shows Simple Plan's investment in the future." Sean Richardson of Entertainment Weekly praised the band for maintaining their sense of humor and energy on the album, concluding that "Life may be complicated for Avril Lavigne's favorite opening act, but they're smart enough to understand that sometimes music shouldn't be." While mixed on the teenage-aimed lyrics, Jenny Eliscu of Rolling Stone found the production and instrumentation of the tracks catchy and worthy of being released as singles, saying that "[D]espite the overwrought angst, Still Not Getting Any . . . is a hard-to-deny collection of bubblegum punk."

Nick Catucci of Blender commended the band for adding their own musical choices to the pop-punk formula that evoke emotional introspection and empowerment but found it lacking in substance and stand out musicianship, concluding that "Simple Plan are gluttons for the pleasure of release, a quality they picked up from an earlier generation of wound-up punk. Though that's also the only quality to which they've remained loyal." Jon Pareles of The New York Times was mixed on the messages that Bouvier delivered throughout the album, concluding that "Individually, the songs are catchy, but as they pile up over the length of the album, it's impossible not to wonder whether the singer's endless complaints didn't drive everyone away." Robert Christgau graded the album as a "dud", indicating "a bad record whose details rarely merit further thought."

NME listed the album as one of "20 Pop Punk Albums Which Will Make You Nostalgic".

== Commercial performance ==
It debuted and peaked at number 3 on the US Billboard 200 with over 139,000 copies sold in its first week. The record was certified Platinum by the Recording Industry Association of America (RIAA), denoting shipments of one million copies. As Of July 2005, it has sold 1.2 million copies in the US.

Lead single "Welcome to My Life" peaked at number 40 on the Billboard Hot 100, number 10 on Mainstream Top 40, and was certified gold by the RIAA for 500,000 shipments.

== Track listing ==
All songs written by Simple Plan.

| No. | Title | Length |
|---|---|---|
| 1. | "Shut Up!" | 3:01 |
| 2. | "Welcome to My Life" | 3:22 |
| 3. | "Perfect World" | 3:51 |
| 4. | "Thank You" | 2:53 |
| 5. | "Me Against the World" | 3:12 |
| 6. | "Crazy" | 3:38 |
| 7. | "Jump" | 3:08 |
| 8. | "Everytime" | 4:01 |
| 9. | "Promise" | 3:32 |
| 10. | "One" | 3:22 |
| 11. | "Untitled" | 3:57 |
| Total length: | | 37:58 |

Tour edition bonus tracks
| No. | Title | Length |
|---|---|---|
| 12. | "Perfect" (Live) |
| 13. | "The Worst Day Ever" (Live) |
| 14. | "Addicted" (Live) |
| 15. | "I'd Do Anything" (Live) |
| 16. | "Welcome to My Life" (Acoustic) |

Tour edition
| No. | Title | Length |
|---|---|---|
| 1. | "Making Of "Welcome to My Life" Video" |
| 2. | "Welcome to My Life" (video) |
| 3. | "Shut Up!" (video) |
| 4. | "Making Of "Shut Up!" Video" |
| 5. | "Highlights from Malaysia & Japan Tour, November 2004" |
| 6. | "Highlights from UK Tour, September 2004" |
| 7. | "EPK 2004" |

== Personnel ==
Personnel per booklet.

Simple Plan

- Pierre Bouvier – lead vocals
- Chuck Comeau – drums
- Jeff Stinco – guitars
- Sebastien Lefebvre – guitars, background vocals
- David Desrosiers – bass, background vocals; additional drums (track 11)

Additional musicians

- Bob Buckley – string arrangements (tracks 10 and 11)
- Bill Sample – piano (track 11)

Production

- Bob Rock – producer, engineer
- Eric Helmkamp – engineer, digital engineer
- Mathieu Roberge – digital engineer
- Randy Staub – mixing
- Zach Blackstone – assistance
- George Marino – mastering
- Darcy Proper – 5.1 surround mastering
- Chapman Baehler – album photography
- Simple Plan – art direction, concept
- Christina Dittmar – art direction for Lava
- Fred Jérôme – layout design

== Charts ==
=== Weekly charts ===
Weekly chart performance for Still Not Getting Any...
| Chart (2004–2006) | Peak position |
|---|---|
| Australian Albums (ARIA) | 6 |
| Austrian Albums (Ö3 Austria) | 5 |
| Belgian Albums (Ultratop Flanders) | 37 |
| Belgian Alternative Albums (Ultratop Flanders) | 31 |
| Belgian Albums (Ultratop Wallonia) | 93 |
| Canadian Albums (Billboard) | 2 |
| Dutch Albums (Album Top 100) | 32 |
| Dutch Alternative Albums (Alternative Top 30) | 14 |
| French Albums (SNEP) | 12 |
| German Albums (Offizielle Top 100) | 16 |
| Italian Albums (FIMI) | 18 |
| Japanese Albums (Oricon) | 10 |
| Malaysian International Albums (RIM) | 2 |
| Mexican Albums (AMPROFON) | 9 |
| New Zealand Albums (RMNZ) | 5 |
| Singaporean International Albums (RIAS) | 4 |
| Spanish Albums (Promusicae) | 48 |
| Swedish Albums (Sverigetopplistan) | 26 |
| Swiss Albums (Schweizer Hitparade) | 22 |
| UK Albums (Official Charts) | 101 |
| UK Rock & Metal Albums (Official Charts) | 8 |
| US Billboard 200 | 3 |

=== Year-end charts ===
2004 year-end chart performance for Still Not Getting Any...
| Chart (2004) | Position |
|---|---|
| Australian Albums (ARIA) | 84 |

2005 year-end chart performance for Still Not Getting Any...
| Chart (2005) | Position |
|---|---|
| Australian Albums (ARIA) | 16 |
| Mexican Albums (AMPROFON) | 22 |
| New Zealand Albums (RMNZ) | 50 |
| US Billboard 200 | 48 |

2006 year-end chart performance for Still Not Getting Any...
| Chart (2006) | Position |
|---|---|
| French Albums (SNEP) | 122 |

== Certifications ==
Certifications and sales for Still Not Getting Any...
| Region | Certification | Certified units/sales |
|---|---|---|
| Australia (ARIA) | 3× Platinum | 210,000^{‡} |
| Brazil (Pro-Música Brasil) | Gold | 50,000^{*} |
| Canada (Music Canada) | 4× Platinum | 400,000^{^} |
| France (SNEP) | Gold | 100,000^{*} |
| Japan (RIAJ) | Gold | 100,000^{^} |
| Mexico (AMPROFON) | Gold | 50,000^{^} |
| New Zealand (RMNZ) | Platinum | 15,000^{^} |
| United Kingdom (BPI) | Silver | 60,000^{‡} |
| United States (RIAA) | 2× Platinum | 2,000,000^{‡} |
^{*} Sales figures based on certification alone.^{^} Shipments figures based on certification alone.^{‡} Sales+streaming figures based on certification alone.
