= Crazy (Simple Plan song) =

2005 single by Simple Plan

Single by Simple Plan

from the album Still Not Getting Any...
- B-side: "I'd Do Anything" (MTV Singapore)
- Released: October 17, 2005
- Length: 3:38
- Label: Lava
- Songwriters: Pierre Bouvier; Charles Comeau
- Producer: Bob Rock

Simple Plan singles chronology
"Untitled (How Could This Happen to Me?)" (2005)	"Crazy" (2005)	"When I'm Gone" (2007)

"Crazy" is a song by Canadian rock band Simple Plan. It was released on October 17, 2005, as the fourth single from their second studio album, Still Not Getting Any... (2004). It became a radio hit in Canada, reaching number eight on the Radio & Records CHR/Pop Top 30 listing, and it entered the top 40 in Australia, the Czech Republic, France, and Sweden. Despite being serviced to US radio, it did not chart.

== Music video ==
The video deals with many social problems in modern society. It starts with self-image issues by showing a woman who seems to want to have plastic surgery. Then it shows depression and self-harm with a scarred female teenager writing hateful messages in her journal. With the lines "parents act like it's world war three" there is a shot of a teenage girl sitting on her bed, presumably the child of the fighting parents. It then shows a group of obese people sitting on a beach. There are a few scenes of a child pretending to shoot a screen and being shot himself, presumably a reference to violence in the media and people's desensitization to it. With the words "rich guys driving big SUVs" there is a scene of an older, well dressed couple laughing and drinking together. Immediately after there is a shot of an older homeless man, showing the wealth disparity in society. Other groups shown in the video include veterans, the elderly, and people of colour. The video starts in black and white, but progressively changes to color.

== Track listings ==
UK CD1 and limited-edition 7-inch single

1. "Crazy" (album version)
2. "I'd Do Anything" (MTV Singapore)

UK CD2

1. "Crazy" (album version)
2. "I'd Do Anything" (MTV Singapore)
3. "Crazy" (music video)
4. "Crazy" (making of)

Australian CD single

1. "Crazy" (album version)
2. "Crazy" (live)
3. "Shut Up!" (MTV Singapore)
4. "I'd Do Anything" (MTV Singapore)

== Charts ==
Chart (2005–2006)	Peak position
Australia (ARIA)	32
Canada CHR/Pop Top 30 (Radio & Records)	8
Canada Hot AC Top 30 (Radio & Records)	8
Czech Republic (Rádio – Top 100)	15
France (SNEP)	38
Sweden (Sverigetopplistan)	39
UK Rock & Metal (OCC)	4
