= No Pads, No Helmets...Just Balls =

Studio album by Simple Plan
- Released: March 19, 2002
- Studio: Arnyard (Toronto, Ontario); Select Sound (Buffalo, New York); Studio West (San Diego, California)
- Genre: Pop-punk
- Length: 43:13
- Label: Lava; Atlantic
- Producer: Arnold Lanni

Simple Plan chronology
No Pads, No Helmets...Just Balls (2002)	Still Not Getting Any... (2004)

Singles from No Pads, No Helmets...Just Balls
- 1. "I'm Just a Kid" Released: February 4, 2002; 2. "I'd Do Anything" Released: September 16, 2002; 3. "Addicted" Released: February 24, 2003; 4. "Perfect" Released: August 25, 2003

No Pads, No Helmets...Just Balls is the debut studio album by Canadian rock band Simple Plan. Formed by members of Reset, Simple Plan spent over a year recording their first album with producer Arnold Lanni. It is a pop-punk record that revolves around being an outcast, drawing comparisons to Blink-182, Good Charlotte and New Found Glory. After signing with major label Atlantic Records, "I'm Just a Kid" was released as a single in February 2002, with No Pads, No Helmets...Just Balls following on March 19. It received a mixed reaction from music critics, with some commenting on the lack of originality and others praising the production.

They promoted it with supporting slots for Sugar Ray, Blink-182, Green Day and short stint on Warped Tour. Between support slots for Good Charlotte and the Mighty Mighty Bosstones, "I'd Do Anything" was released as a single. Preceded by the single release of "Addicted", the band supported Avril Lavigne, before appearing on Warped Tour again. Their fourth and final single "Perfect" was followed by radio festivals and a co-headlining tour with MxPx in early 2004.

== Background and production ==
In 1993, vocalist/guitarist Pierre Bouvier and drummer Chuck Comeau formed punk rock band Reset when they were both 13. The group would later tour Canada with the likes of Face to Face, Ten Foot Pole and MxPx. They released their debut album No Worries in 1997; unhappy with the musical direction, Comeau left to attend college. Reset released their follow-up, No Limits in 1999. Later in the year, Comeau formed a new band with guitarists Jeff Stinco and Sebastien Lefebvre. Bouvier was going tired of being both a singer and a guitarist; he met Comeau again in late 1999 and joined the latter's new band. For some time, Bouvier switched between the new group and Reset, before ultimately leaving the latter.

Bassist David Desrosiers briefly filled Bouvier's position in Reset, which impressed Bouvier and Comeau. Desrosiers was interested in joining another band. when he was asked to join the new outfit. As they began touring, they went under the name Simple Plan, and appeared on the 2001 Warped Tour. The band rehearsed material at Rumble Fish Studios, before recording at Arnyard Studios in Toronto, Ontario. Arnold Lanni produced the sessions; he and Ziad Al-Hillal handled recording. There were a number of occasions where Lanni would leave Stinco in charge of recording for a few days at a time, only for him to come back and a scrap everything he did.

Additional recording was done at Select Sound (in Buffalo, New York) and Studio West (in San Diego, California) with Angelo Caruso. The sessions lasted a year to a year-and-a-half, eventually concluding in February 2002. Bouvier said the long process was due to a clash of opinions between the band and Lanni: "He came from a different world than we did, and he wanted to push the quirky, pop side of what we were doing. We were more of the pop-punk guys that wanted to keep it a little more simple." Lanni wanted Bouvier to sound more whiny, which Lanni felt would help the band sound more unique; Bouvier later regretted this. Caruso, Al-Hillal and Dom Condo did digital editing, before the tracks were mastered by George Marino at Sterling Sound in New York City.

== Composition ==
Musically, No Pads, No Helmets...Just Balls has been described as pop-punk, drawing comparisons to Blink-182, Good Charlotte and New Found Glory. The album's predominant theme revolves around being an outcast. The material was written in Comeau's basement; Bouvier said they wanted every track to have "[l]ots of power, energy and catchiness."

The opening track "I'd Do Anything" was one of the first songs written for inclusion on the album, and includes Mark Hoppus of Blink-182 doing back-up vocals. The members had become friends with Blink-182 when Reset opened a show for them in 1997, and subsequently stayed in contact. The narrator reminisces about a girl from high school later in life, and wondering if life would be different if they stayed with her. It is followed by "The Worst Day Ever", which sees Bouvier talk about the worst day he's experienced. Joel Madden of Good Charlotte provided back-up vocals for "You Don't Mean Anything". Bouvier said he and Comeau wrote "I'm Just a Kid" about how they felt when they attending high school, namely "feel[ing] like it's the end of the world". Lanni contributed piano to "Meet You There". With "My Alien", the narrator divulges his relationship with an extraterrestrial. Discussing the closing track "Perfect", Bouvier said it was about parents wanting and expecting a lot from their children, such as pushing them into careers they don't want.

== Release ==
Partway through the recording sessions, they signed to major label Atlantic Records in October 2001. "I'm Just a Kid" was released as a single on February 4, 2002. The CD version included "One by One" and "Grow Up" as extra tracks. The band wanted "Addicted" as the first single, however, due to a film opportunity, "I'm Just a Kid" was chosen instead; it ultimately appeared on the soundtrack for The New Guy. The song's music video was directed by Smith N' Borin; it features DJ Qualls and Eliza Dushku (both of whom appear in The New Guy). The clip shows the pair dating, which ties into The New Guy, while the band attempts to impress Dushku.

No Pads, No Helmets...Just Balls was released on March 19 through Lava and Atlantic Records. Various countries and territories had different bonus tracks: Australia and Japan ("One by One" and "Grow Up"), the US ("Grow Up" and "My Christmas List"), and Europe ("Grow Up" and a live cover of "American Jesus" by Bad Religion). On June 8, a music video was filmed for "I'd Do Anything" in Toronto, Canada, and additional filming being done in Cleveland, Ohio with Hoppus. "I'd Do Anything" was released as a single on September 16. The CD version included "Vacation", a live version of "The Worst Day Ever", and video for "I'd Do Anything".

The Japanese-exclusive live album Live in Japan 2002 was released on January 21, 2003. "Addicted" was released as a single on February 24. The CD version included a cover of Cheap Trick song "Surrender" and the video for "Addicted", while the 7" vinyl version included "Surrender" and a demo of "One by One". The track's music video was directed by Smith N' Borin. In the clip, the band destroy possessions in a room, and ends with an explosion, inspired by an effect in The Natural (1984).

"Perfect" was released as a single on August 25, 2003. The CD version included an acoustic version of "Perfect" and a cover of the Turtles' "Happy Together". The song's video was directed by Liz Friedlander, and sees the group playing on the roof of a house in the rain. On November 25, the video album A Big Package for You: 1999–2003 was released; it contained footage from the recording of the album and various home videos, alongside the music videos for "I'm Just a Kid", "I'd Do Anything", "Addicted" and "Perfect".

The album was included in a package with Get Your Heart On! (2011) in 2012. In March and April 2017, the band went on a celebratory 15-year anniversary tour for the album in the US. To coincide with this, the album was pressed on vinyl. It was followed by European leg in May and June, a second US stint in August and September, and Australia and New Zealand in April 2018. A 15th anniversary edition of the album was released, featuring several bonus tracks: "One by One", "Grow Up", "Happy Together", "Vacation", live versions of "Addicted" and "Perfect", and an acoustic version of "Perfect". "I'm Just a Kid" saw a resurgence in popularity in 2020 due to a challenge on the social media platform TikTok that involves family members re-creating childhood photos.

== Touring ==
Following the album's release, the band promoted it with a supporting slot for Sugar Ray. In June, the band supported Blink-182 and Green Day on their co-headlining North American tour Pop Disaster. In August, the band appeared on a handful of 2002 Warped Tour dates. Throughout the tour, the band were accused of selling out due to their commercial appeal. Following this, the group toured Australia and New Zealand for two weeks before returning to the US, where they played with Good Charlotte for two weeks. On September 20 and October 8, Simple Plan performed on Total Request Live. They played in Canada, prior to a US support slot for the Mighty Mighty Bosstones in November and December. Later in December, the band performed on Total Request Live and Sports Unlimited.

In January and February 2003, the group appeared on Late Night with Conan O'Brien and Jimmy Kimmel Live!. In March 2003, the band toured the US, with Gob and Madcap, and performed on The Tonight Show with Jay Leno. In April and May 2003, the band supported Avril Lavigne on her Try to Shut Me Up! Tour in the US. From June to August, the group went on the 2003 Warped Tour. On August 12, the band appeared on Total Request Live again. Following the release of A Big Package, the group played a handful of radio festivals in December, and a handful of shows with Jersey, Gob, and Don't Look Down. In January and February 2004, the band embarked on a co-headlining US tour with MxPx. They were supported by Sugarcult, Motion City Soundtrack and Billy Talent. Throughout February 2004, Simple Plan appeared on IMX, The Tonight Show with Jay Leno, and Jimmy Kimmel Live!.

== Critical response ==
Professional ratings
Review scores
Source	Rating
AllMusic	4/5 stars
Chart Attack	Unfavorable
Exclaim!	Unfavorable
IGN	6/10
Melodic	3/5 stars
Rolling Stone	2/5 stars

No Pads, No Helmets...Just Balls received mixed reviews from music critics. AllMusic reviewer Todd Kristel opened his piece by stating the band didn't have "anything new to say, but at least it sounds like they're having a good time saying it", being "so full of pep and energy". The band fails to "break any new ground and doesn't stay revved on all cylinders all the time." Pär Winberg of Melodic said he was "so bored" with Blink-182 ripoff acts such as Simple Plan "trying to be funny on the sleeve with a nerd look". Though the tracks were "so damn good" and the "superb production" from Lanni gave it a "[g]reat sound all over". The "lack of originality takes down the grading a bit." Exclaim!'s Stuart Green said the group disseminated a "trite and derivative brand of inoffensive mall punk" in the vein of New Found Glory and Good Charlotte. With the aid of Lanni, the tracks were "polished to a glossy finish that will undoubtedly find itself a market."

IGN writer JR viewed it as "harmless bubblegum pop-punk for the junior high set", and said multiple listens of it were "considerably less taxing on the psyche" than his initial impression. He added that its "shelf-life is remarkably poor and it brings absolutely nothing of consequence to the table". Hannah Guy of Chart Attack said the group "delved into the previously explored-and-pillaged genre of pop-punk", however, they lacked the hooks of their peers. It was "pretty lame ó and it'll likely be one of Canadian music's next big exports." Rolling Stone's Jon Caramanica wrote that the tracks were "brief, ephemeral, tautly structured, bombastically produced blasts of snotty posing." Similar to their peers, the band "insist on balancing their immaturity with excuses for their immaturity".

No Pads, No Helmets...Just Balls was included on best-of pop-punk album lists by A.Side TV, BuzzFeed, Houston Press, Rock Sound and Rolling Stone. Cleveland.com ranked "I’d Do Anything" at number 31 on their list of the top 100 pop-punk songs.

== Commercial performance ==
No Pads, No Helmets...Just Balls was a commercial success. The album peaked at number 8 on the Canadian Alternative Albums Chart, and was certified double platinum. It also peaked at number 35 on the United States Billboard 200, and at number 2 on the US catalog albums chart. In Australia, it reached number 29.

It was certified double platinum in Canada (Music Canada) and the US (Recording Industry Association of America), denoting shipments of two million copies; platinum in Australia (Australian Recording Industry Association); gold in New Zealand (Recorded Music NZ); and silver in the UK (British Phonographic Industry). Similarly, "I'm Just a Kid" was certified platinum in the US, and "Perfect" was certified platinum in Australia.

== Track listing ==
Track listing per booklet. All songs by Simple Plan, except "Happy Together" written by Alan Gordon and Gary Bonner.

No.	Title	Length
1.	"I'd Do Anything"	3:17
2.	"The Worst Day Ever"	3:27
3.	"You Don't Mean Anything"	2:28
4.	"I'm Just a Kid"	3:18
5.	"When I'm with You"	2:37
6.	"Meet You There"	4:14
7.	"Addicted"	3:52
8.	"My Alien"	3:08
9.	"God Must Hate Me"	2:44
10.	"I Won't Be There"	3:09
11.	"One Day"	3:15
12.	"Perfect"	4:37
13.	"My Christmas List (Hidden Track)"	3:27
Total length:		43:13

15th Anniversary Tour Edition

No.	Title	Length
13.	"One by One"	3:23
14.	"Grow Up"	2:33
15.	"Happy Together"	2:35
16.	"Addicted (Live from California 2017)"	4:20
17.	"Vacation"	2:31
18.	"Perfect (Live from California 2017)"	5:03
19.	"Perfect (Acoustic Version)"	4:07
Total length:		63:58

== Personnel ==
Personnel per booklet.

Simple Plan

- Pierre Bouvier – lead vocals
- Chuck Comeau – drums
- David Desrosiers – bass, backing vocals
- Sébastien Lefebvre – guitar, backing vocals
- Jeff Stinco – guitar

Additional musicians

- Mark Hoppus – back-up vocals (track 1)
- Joel Madden – back-up vocals (track 3)
- Arnold Lanni – piano (track 6)

Production

- Arnold Lanni – producer, mixing, recording
- Ziad Al-Hillal – recording, digital editing
- Angelo Caruso – additional recording, digital editing
- Dom Condo – digital editing
- George Marino – mastering
- Simple Plan – concept, layout
- F. Scott Schafer – photography
- Lynn Kowalewski – art direction

== Charts ==
=== Weekly charts ===
Weekly chart performance for No Pads, No Helmets...Just Balls
Chart (2002–2005)	Peak position
Australian Albums (ARIA)	29
Canadian Albums (Billboard)	22
Canadian Alternative Albums (Billboard)	8
Japanese Albums (Oricon)	20
New Zealand Albums (RMNZ)	5
UK Albums (OCC)	179
UK Rock & Metal Albums (OCC)	24
US Billboard 200	35

=== Year-end charts ===
2002 year-end chart performance for No Pads, No Helmets...Just Balls
Chart (2002)	Position
Canadian Albums (Billboard)	88
Canadian Alternative Albums (Billboard)	25

2003 year-end chart performance for No Pads, No Helmets...Just Balls
Chart (2003)	Position
US Billboard 200	70

2004 year-end chart performance for No Pads, No Helmets...Just Balls
Chart (2004)	Position
US Billboard 200	120

== Certifications ==
Certifications for No Pads, No Helmets...Just Balls
Region	Certification	Certified units/sales
Australia (ARIA)	Platinum	70,000^{^}
Canada (Music Canada)	3× Platinum	300,000^{‡}
Japan (RIAJ)	Gold	100,000^{^}
New Zealand (RMNZ)	Gold	7,500^{^}
United Kingdom (BPI)	Silver	60,000^{‡}
United States (RIAA)	2× Platinum	2,000,000^{^}
^{^} Shipments figures based on certification alone.^{‡} Sales+streaming figures based on certification alone.
