= Shut Up! (Simple Plan song) =

2005 single by Simple Plan

Single by Simple Plan

from the album Still Not Getting Any...
- Released: January 25, 2005
- Length: 3:01 (album version); 3:31 (video version)
- Label: Lava
- Songwriters: Pierre Bouvier; Chuck Comeau
- Producer: Bob Rock

Simple Plan singles chronology
"Welcome to My Life" (2004)	"Shut Up!" (2005)	"Untitled (How Could This Happen to Me?)" (2005)

Music video
- "Shut Up!" on YouTube

"Shut Up!" is a song by Canadian rock band Simple Plan for their second studio album, Still Not Getting Any... (2004). The song was written primarily as a defiant response to music critics who frequently dismissed the band's music as "commercialized" or "mainstream". The lyrics serve as a message that the band won't let negativity or criticism bring them down. Some fans also interpret the lyrics as a more personal message about standing up to a controlling partner or authority figure.

Released in January 2005, "Shut Up!" stalled at number 99 on the US Billboard Hot 100 but was more successful internationally, charting at number three in Sweden and reaching the top 20 in Australia and New Zealand. Simple Plan performed this song on the 2005 Kids' Choice Awards.

== Music video ==
The video starts out with the band members walking down the street, into the Millennium Biltmore Hotel in downtown Los Angeles. Once inside, they walk into the ballroom, where there is a fancy party going on. Grabbing their instruments, they start playing, creating a huge disturbance. The party goers begin to get very upset, as the members of Simple Plan begin jumping on tables and destroying everything. This is where Pierre Bouvier first does his knee dance. As some of the younger members of the party begin to start getting into it, the band's manager leans towards Bouvier and says "Dude, there's been a major mix up." Pierre asks "Are we in the wrong place?" and, upon confirmation, exclaims "I thought something was up!" The video then goes through a fast motion rewind, and ends up in a club, where the remainder of the song is played.

== Track listings ==
UK and Australian CD single

1. "Shut Up!" (album version)
2. "Welcome to My Life" (acoustic)
3. "I'd Do Anything" (live from Burning Van)

European CD single

1. "Shut Up!" (album version)
2. "Welcome to My Life" (acoustic)

European DVD single

1. "Shut Up!" (album version)
2. "Shut Up!" (Dolby 5.1 Surround mix)
3. "Shut Up!" (video)
4. "Simple Plan EPK" (video)

== Charts ==
=== Weekly charts ===
Chart (2005)	Peak position
Australia (ARIA)	14
Austria (Ö3 Austria Top 40)	59
Canada CHR/Pop Top 30 (Radio & Records)	12
Germany (GfK)	25
Hungary (Rádiós Top 40)	37
Netherlands (Single Top 100)	35
New Zealand (Recorded Music NZ)	11
Scotland Singles (Official Charts)	41
Sweden (Sverigetopplistan)	3
UK Singles (Official Charts)	44
US Billboard Hot 100	99

=== Year-end charts ===
Chart (2005)	Position
Australia (ARIA)	62
Brazil (Crowley)	38

== Certifications ==
Region	Certification	Certified units/sales
Australia (ARIA)	Gold	35,000^{^}
Canada (Music Canada)	Gold	40,000^{‡}
United States (RIAA)	Gold	500,000^{‡}
^{^} Shipments figures based on certification alone.^{‡} Sales+streaming figures based on certification alone.

== Release history ==
Region	Date	Format(s)	Label(s)	Ref.
United States	January 25, 2005	Contemporary hit radio	Lava	
United Kingdom	February 21, 2005	CD	Lava	
Australia	February 28, 2005	CD	Lava	
