= Welcome to My Life =

2004 single by Simple Plan

Single by Simple Plan

from the album Still Not Getting Any...
- B-side: "Worst Day Ever" (live)
- Released: September 13, 2004
- Genre: Pop-punk; emo
- Length: 3:22
- Label: Lava
- Songwriters: Pierre Bouvier; Chuck Comeau
- Producer: Bob Rock

Simple Plan singles chronology
| "Don't Wanna Think About You" (2004) | "Welcome to My Life" (2004) | "Shut Up!" (2005) |

Music video
- "Welcome to My Life" on YouTube

"Welcome to My Life" is a song by Canadian rock band Simple Plan. It was made available for streaming through AOL.com on September 6, before being sent to radio on September 13, as the lead single from their second studio album, Still Not Getting Any... (2004). The song peaked at number 40 on the US Billboard Hot 100, number seven in Australia, and number five in New Zealand, giving the band their highest-charting song there. It is certified double platinum in the United States and Canada, platinum in Australia, and gold in Italy and New Zealand.

== Background and composition ==
The song's intention is to express teenage angst about life becoming so frustrating that no one can understand how awful it is for them. The lyrics explore feelings of being misunderstood, ignored, and "pushed around," resonating deeply with fans who feel out of place. The track is in half-time and was compared to fellow Canadian artist Avril Lavigne. It starts off with acoustic guitars, with power chords coming in during the chorus sections.

== Music video ==
The video opens with a news report about a massive traffic jam. In the music video, a traffic jam is seen and scenes are shown in which passengers deal with dysfunctional families and how the families' dysfunction affects their lives. At the end of the video, a few of the people in the traffic jam get out of their cars and begin to walk down the road. The music video was directed by Philip Atwell, who is also known for his work with rappers Eminem, Dr. Dre and 50 Cent, and shot at the Henry Ford Bridge and the Commodore Schuyler F. Heim Bridge in San Pedro, Los Angeles. The video received some criticism for being similar to R.E.M.'s "Everybody Hurts".

== Chart performance ==
"Welcome to My Life" became another top-40 hit on the US Billboard Hot 100, peaking at the number-40 position. It reached the top 10 in Australia and New Zealand, peaking at number seven in the former country and number five in the latter.

== Track listings ==
UK and European CD single

1. "Welcome to My Life"
2. "Addicted" (live)

UK 7-inch single

A. "Welcome to My Life"
B. "Worst Day Ever" (live)

Australian CD single

1. "Welcome to My Life"
2. "Addicted" (live)
3. "Worst Day Ever" (live)

== Charts ==
=== Weekly charts ===
| Chart (2004–2006) | Peak position |
|---|---|
| Australia (ARIA) | 7 |
| Belgium (Ultratip Bubbling Under Flanders) | 8 |
| Canada CHR (Nielsen BDS) | 2 |
| Canada CHR/Pop Top 30 (Radio & Records) | 2 |
| Canada Hot AC (Radio & Records) | 3 |
| Czech Republic Airplay (ČNS IFPI) | 23 |
| France (SNEP) | 12 |
| Germany (GfK) | 70 |
| Netherlands (Dutch Top 40) | 26 |
| Netherlands (Single Top 100) | 39 |
| New Zealand (Recorded Music NZ) | 5 |
| Scotland Singles (OCC) | 38 |
| Sweden (Sverigetopplistan) | 33 |
| UK Singles (OCC) | 49 |
| US Billboard Hot 100 | 40 |
| US Adult Pop Airplay (Billboard) | 26 |
| US Pop Airplay (Billboard) | 10 |

=== Year-end charts ===
| Chart (2004) | Position |
|---|---|
| Australia (ARIA) | 76 |
| US Mainstream Top 40 (Billboard) | 98 |

| Chart (2005) | Position |
|---|---|
| Australia (ARIA) | 57 |
| US Adult Top 40 (Billboard) | 70 |
| US Mainstream Top 40 (Billboard) | 79 |

== Certifications ==
| Region | Certification | Certified units/sales |
|---|---|---|
| Australia (ARIA) | Platinum | 70,000^{^} |
| Canada (Music Canada) | 2× Platinum | 160,000^{‡} |
| Italy (FIMI) Since 2009 | Gold | 50,000^{‡} |
| New Zealand (RMNZ) | Gold | 15,000^{‡} |
| United States (RIAA) | 2× Platinum | 2,000,000^{‡} |
^{^} Shipments figures based on certification alone.^{‡} Sales+streaming figures based on certification alone.

== Release history ==
| Region | Date | Format(s) | Label(s) | Ref. |
|---|---|---|---|---|
| United States | September 13, 2004 | Modern rock radio | Lava | |
| Australia | October 25, 2004 | CD | Lava | |
| United Kingdom | June 20, 2005 | 7-inch vinyl; CD | Lava | |
