= Chuck Comeau =

Canadian musician and drummer (born 1979)

Chuck Comeau MSC
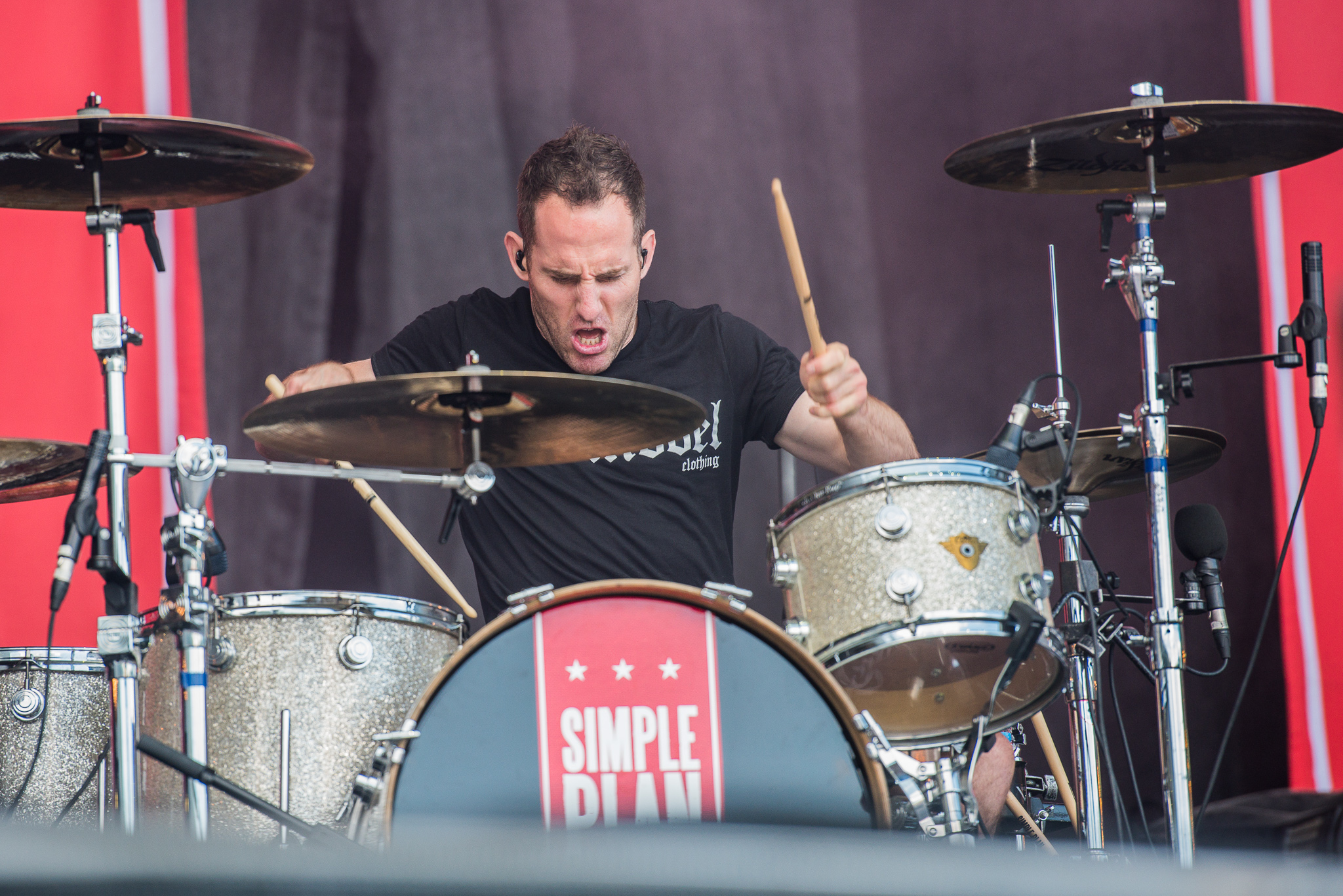
- Comeau performing with Simple Plan at Rock im Park 2017

Background information
- Born: Charles-André Comeau; 17 September 1979 (age 46); Montreal, Quebec, Canada
- Genres: Pop-punk; alternative rock; pop rock; punk rock; power pop; emo
- Occupations: Musician; clothes designer; businessman; writer; director; actor
- Instruments: Drums; percussion
- Years active: 1993–present
- Labels: Lava; Atlantic
- Member of: Simple Plan
- Formerly of: Reset

Charles-André "Chuck" Comeau MSC (born 17 September 1979) is a Canadian musician best known for being the drummer of the rock band Simple Plan. He also founded the apparel company Role Model Clothing along with his bandmate Pierre Bouvier and the band's best friend, Patrick Langlois. He is also former drummer for the punk rock band Reset from 1993 to 1999, which he quit to form Simple Plan with his bandmate who also left Reset, Pierre Bouvier.

== Early life ==
Comeau was born to Françoise and André Comeau. He has a brother named Louis and a nephew named Mathieu. Chuck Comeau attended Beaubois high school in Montreal, Quebec, along with bandmates Pierre Bouvier, Sébastien Lefebvre, and Jeff Stinco, where they formed Simple Plan. Comeau originally studied law at McGill University in Montreal, but left to pursue his music career.

== Career ==
=== Reset (1993–1999) ===
Comeau started his music career in 1993, when he was 13 years old, along with bandmate Pierre Bouvier. Comeau left Reset in 1998 to study law at McGill University, then left to pursue a music career. He later reunited with Bouvier at a Sugar Ray concert, and in 1999 they formed Simple Plan along with old schoolmates Sébastien Lefebvre and Jeff Stinco. Later, David Desrosiers replaced Bouvier in Reset, but only lasted six months before leaving Reset to join Simple Plan.

Comeau has released 1 album with Reset: No Worries (1997)

=== Simple Plan (1999–present) ===
After leaving Reset, Comeau became the drummer for Simple Plan. Simple Plan has sold more than 15 million records worldwide.

Comeau has featured on all of the Simple Plan albums: No Pads, No Helmets...Just Balls (2002), Still, Not Getting Any (2004), Simple Plan (2008), Get Your Heart On! (2011) and Taking One for the Team (2016). Simple Plan has released 2 EPs: Live in Anaheim (2004) and Get Your Heart On – The Second Coming! (2013). Simple Plan has released 2 live albums: Live in Japan 2002 (2003) and MTV Hard Rock Live (2005). Simple Plan has also released a video album directed by Comeau, titled A Big Package for You (2002).

=== Clothing line ===
In 2001, before the band signed to a major label, Comeau, Bouvier and their longtime best friend Patrick Langlois launched the apparel company Role Model Clothing in an effort to create clothes that represented their lifestyle and their love of music. The band members can be seen wearing the clothing in some Simple Plan videos. The brand became inactive in 2010, mostly due to Simple Plan being very busy working on (and later promoting) their fourth studio album Get Your Heart On!. In an interview for SimplePlan.cz in 2013, Comeau explained the "hiatus" of their clothing line and talked a bit more about its future:

We partnered up with someone to help us make it bigger and the partnership didn't really work out. So we ended up splitting from that person and that company. And with the last record we've been so busy and we didn't have a lot of time to put into it. It's still something that I wanna do and I think that now that we're touring a little less, we wanna revive the project. So to me, Role Model is not dead, we just hit pause on it for a little bit and I would like to revive it. I just think we'll go back to simple things like hoodies and caps and t-shirts, because when we tried to take the line into a full line, it was too much and it was too quick. And I think it will be much better to keep it simple, keep it to what you guys wear, what we wear anyway.

— Chuck Comeau

In 2017, when Simple Plan's debut album celebrated its 15th anniversary, the band brought back two "old-school designs" of Role Model Clothing, which were available for a limited time at their merch stand.

=== Directing ===
Comeau directed and starred in Simple Plan's video album A Big Package for You (2002).

== Equipment ==
He currently uses DW drums, pedals and hardware, Evans Drumheads, Promark Drumsticks and Zildjian cymbals. His kit consist of two floor toms, one rack tom, a bass drum, and a snare drum.

== Personal life ==
Comeau married Jacquelin Napal on July 8, 2014, in Los Angeles and on July 1, 2015, the couple had their first son, London Alexander Comeau.

During a concert with Simple Plan in Detroit, a fan threw a glass bottle towards the stage, which hit Comeau in the face. He had to play the whole show with his face full of blood. After the concert, they went to the hospital and Comeau received four stitches to his nose and below his teeth.

== Influences ==
Comeau has been influenced by Blink-182, Good Charlotte, Linkin Park, Sugar Ray, The Beach Boys, Nirvana, Foo Fighters, and Guns N' Roses.

== Discography ==
Simple Plan

- No Pads, No Helmets...Just Balls (2002)
- Still, Not Getting Any... (2004)
- Simple Plan (2008)
- Get Your Heart On! (2011)
- Taking One for the Team (2016)
- Harder Than It Looks (2022)
