= I'd Do Anything (Simple Plan song) =

2002 single by Simple Plan

Single by Simple Plan featuring Mark Hoppus

from the album No Pads, No Helmets...Just Balls
- Released: September 16, 2002
- Genre: Pop-punk
- Length: 3:17
- Label: Lava
- Songwriters: Pierre Bouvier; Chuck Comeau; Arnold Lanni; Sébastien Lefebvre; Jeff Stinco
- Producer: Arnold Lanni

Simple Plan singles chronology
"I'm Just a Kid" (2002)	"I'd Do Anything" (2002)	"Addicted" (2003)

Music video
- "I'd Do Anything" on YouTube

"I'd Do Anything" is a song by Canadian rock band Simple Plan. It was released on September 16, 2002, as the second single from their debut album, No Pads, No Helmets...Just Balls. It features vocals from Mark Hoppus of Blink-182.

== Background and composition ==
The song is about a relationship breakup and the singer's attempts to get the person back. In a 2004 interview, guitarist Sébastien Lefebvre revealed the song is "about how in high school you've got a crush on [a] girl, but she doesn't know you even exist." "I'd Do Anything" was one of the first songs singer Pierre Bouvier and drummer Chuck Comeau wrote as Simple Plan; the two had previously collaborated in Reset, an earlier iteration of the band. The group recorded their earliest demos, including one for "Anything", at a small studio in Montreal.

The song features backing vocals from Blink-182's Mark Hoppus. The "na na na" refrain was written specifically for Hoppus. His inclusion on the song stemmed from Bouvier and Comeau's longtime love of Blink-182. Reset had played with the trio when they toured through Montreal in the mid-1990s. As a fan, Comeau would travel to where Blink was playing and would wait by their tour bus to get Hoppus' attention and share the band's demo tape. Eventually, Hoppus acquiesced and the two began communicating by email in 2001; he thought "Anything" was a particularly strong demo, and the band offered him a spot on the song. Lava was prepared to compensate Hoppus but he declined the payment, offering the feature as a gesture of goodwill to the upstart band.

== Chart performance ==
On the US Billboard Hot 100, "I'd Do Anything" peaked at number 51. It also charted on the Billboard Mainstream Top 40 chart, where it reached number 15. Internationally, the song reached number 78 in the United Kingdom and number 92 in Australia.

== Music video ==
On June 8, 2002, a music video was filmed for "I'd Do Anything" in Toronto, Canada, and additional filming being done in Cleveland, Ohio with Hoppus. The music video for the song revolves around kids trying to get into a Simple Plan concert by first impressing the doorman.

== Track listing ==
1. "I'd Do Anything" (album version)
2. "I'm Just a Kid" (single version)
3. "Grow Up"
4. "My Christmas List"
5. "I'm Just a Kid" (enhanced video)

== Charts ==
=== Weekly charts ===
Chart (2002–2003)	Peak position
Australia (ARIA)	92
Scottish Singles Sales (Official Charts)	74
UK Singles (Official Charts)	78
US Billboard Hot 100	51
US Pop Airplay (Billboard)	15

=== Year-end charts ===
Chart (2003)	Position
US Mainstream Top 40 (Billboard)	69

== Certifications ==
Region	Certification	Certified units/sales
United States (RIAA)	Platinum	1,000,000^{‡}
^{‡} Sales+streaming figures based on certification alone.

== Release history ==
Region	Date	Format(s)	Label(s)	Ref.
Australia	September 16, 2002	CD	Lava	
United States	September 23, 2002	Alternative radio	Lava	
United Kingdom	March 10, 2003	CD	Lava	
