= Adrian Newman (producer) =

Australian musician

Adrian Newman is a multi-platinum songwriter/producer

== Discography ==
=== Singles and albums ===
Year	Song title	Artist	Album	Chart/Certification	Role
2020	Anthem	Connor Bvrns & Bonn			Writer/Arranger
2020	MMXX (2020)	Royal & the Serpent			Writer/Producer/Vocal Producer/Engineer/Keyboards
2019	JOY	Gawler & Francci Richard			Writer/Producer/Vocal Producer/Engineer/Keyboards/Mixer/Mastering
2019	Mad Man	Jena Rose			Writer/Producer/Vocal Producer/Engineer/Keyboards/Mixer
2019	Starve	OG3NE			Writer/Producer/Keyboards
2019	To My Mother	Hope Waidley			Writer/Producer/Vocal Producer/Engineer/Guitars/Keyboards/Mixer
2018	The Other Woman	KP Wolfe	Exodus		Writer/Producer/Vocal Producer/Engineer/Guitars/Keyboards/Mixer
2018	Exodus	KP Wolfe	Exodus		Writer/Producer/Vocal Producer/Engineer/Guitars/Keyboards/Mixer
2018	Take Back The Ring	KP Wolfe	Exodus		Writer/Producer/Vocal Producer/Engineer/Guitars/Keyboards/Mixer
2018	Finally	Gawler & Alice France	Finally		Producer/Vocal Producer/Engineer/Guitars/Keyboards/Mixer
2018	She May Be The One	Drew Seeley	Down Time		Writer/Producer/Vocal Producer/Engineer/Guitars/Keyboards/Mixer
2018	Live A Little	Drew Seeley	Down Time		Writer/Producer/Vocal Producer/Engineer/Guitars/Keyboards/Mixer
2018	Across My Heart	Gawler & Aston Merrygold	Across My Heart		Writer/Producer/Vocal Producer/Engineer/Guitars/Keyboards/Mixer
2017	Finally	Tom & Collins	A Different Kind of High		Writer/Arranger/Vocal Producer/Engineer
2017	In The Fall	Natalise + the Sunset Run	Constellations		Writer/Producer/Vocal Producer/Engineer/Guitars/Keyboards
2017	Top Down	Brown & Gray			Vocal Producer/Engineer
2017	Laugh	Mackenzie Sol			Producer/Vocal Producer/Engineer/Guitars/Keyboards/Percussion
2017	Sweet Lies	Solano Ft. Sam Gray			Writer/Producer/Vocal Producer/Engineer/Keyboards/Mixing
2016	Still in Love	Mandy Jiroux	From The Heart		Writer/Producer/Vocal Producer/Engineer/Keyboards/Mixing
2016	Tax and the Man	Grizzly Derringer	American Dream		Producer/Vocal Producer/Engineer/Mixing
2016	Sometimes	Grizzly Derringer	American Dream		Producer/Vocal Producer/Engineer/Mixing
2016	Tick Tick Tock	Grizzly Derringer	American Dream		Producer/Vocal Producer/Engineer/Mixing
2016	Red West	Grizzly Derringer	American Dream		Producer/Vocal Producer/Engineer/Mixing
2016	El Camino	Grizzly Derringer	American Dream		Producer/Vocal Producer/Engineer/Mixing
2016	American Dream	Grizzly Derringer	American Dream		Producer/Vocal Producer/Engineer/Mixing
2015	Kiss You Inside Out	Andee	Black & White Heart	No. 16 Billboard Album	Writer
2014	Go Time	Jackie Evancho			Writer/Producer/Engineer/Guitars/Keyboards
2013	Mexico	Hedley	Wild Life	No. 2 iTunes Albums, No. 4 Billboard Album, Platinum Award	Writer/Producer/Engineer/Guitars/Keyboards
2013	Wild Life	Hedley	Wild Life	No. 2 iTunes Albums, No. 4 Billboard Album, Platinum Award	Writer
2013	I'm Alive	Michael Franti	All People	No. 4 Billboard Rock Album, Top 10 iTunes & Amazon Album, no. 33 Billboard Single, Top 5 AAA Radio Single	Writer/Producer/Vocal Producer/Engineer/Guitars/Keyboards/Percussion
2013	Long Ride Home	Michael Franti	All People	No. 4 Billboard Rock Album, Top 10 iTunes & Amazon Album	Writer/Producer/Vocal Producer/Engineer/Guitars/Keyboards/Percussion
2013	Closer To You	Michael Franti	All People	No. 4 Billboard Rock Album, Top 10 iTunes & Amazon Album	Writer/Producer/Vocal Producer/Engineer/Guitars/Keyboards/Percussion
2013	Say Goodbye	Michael Franti	All People	No. 4 Billboard Rock Album, Top 10 iTunes & Amazon Album	Writer/Producer/Vocal Producer/Engineer/Guitars/Keyboards/Percussion
2013	Unstoppable	Chloe x Halle	Austin & Alley: Turn It Up	No. 3 iTunes Album, US Top Soundtracks #6, US Kids Album #2, US Billboard #89	Writer/Producer/Vocal Producer/Engineer/Guitars/Keyboards/Mixing
2013	Killer	Sharon Doorson	Killer	Top 29 Album (Netherlands), Top 30 Single (Netherlands)	Writer
2012	Kiss You Inside Out	Hedley	Storms	No. 1 Radio Pop Single, No. 2 iTunes Single, No. 2 Billboard Single, No. 4 Hot Ac Radio Single, 3× Platinum Award	Writer/Producer/Vocal Producer/Engineer/Guitars/Keyboards
2012	Smile	Sabrina Carpenter	Disney Fairies: Faith, Trust & Pixie Dust	No. 16 Billboard Top Kid	Writer/Producer/Vocal Producer/Engineer/Guitars/Keyboards/Mixing
2012	Change Scenes	Britt Burton	Wreck It Ralph		Writer/Producer/Vocal Producer/Engineer/Guitars/Keyboards/Mixing
2012	Game Over	Josh Milan	Wreck It Ralph		Writer/Producer/Vocal Producer/Engineer/Guitars/Keyboards/Mixing
2011	Bling Bling Bling	Kumi Koda	Beach Mix	No. 4 Album (Japan), Oricon Daily Chart No.3	Writer/Producer/Vocal Producer/Engineer/Guitars/Keyboards
2009	Dress Off	BoA	BoA	No. 1 Billboard Top Heatseekers Album, No. 127 Billboard Album, No. 1 Album (Japan), No. 1 Album (Korea), Platinum Award	Writer/Producer/Vocal Producer/Engineer/Keyboards
2009	Scream	BoA	BoA	No. 1 Billboard Top Heatseekers Album, No. 127 Billboard Album, No. 1 Album (Japan), No. 1 Album (Korea), Platinum Award	Writer/Producer/Vocal Producer/Engineer/Keyboards
2009	Bling Bling Bling	Kumi Koda	Trick	No. 1 Album (Japan), No. 1 Ringtone (Japan), 2× Platinum Award	Writer/Producer/Engineer/Keyboards
2008	What If	No Angels	Destiny (Reloaded)	No. 4 Album (Germany)	Writer/Producer/Vocal Producer/Engineer/Keyboards
2008	LoveJuice	Kat-Tun		Platinum Award	Writer/Producer/Engineer/Keyboards
2008	Freaky	Sichelle		Top 20 Single (Norway), Top 20 Album (Norway)	Writer/Producer
2008	What If	Jody Williams	Just Gonna Be Me	No. 1 Album (South Africa), Platinum Award	Writer
2008	Emergency	Jade MacRae	Get Me Home		Writer/Producer/Vocal Producer/Engineer/Guitars/Keyboards
2008	Low	Jade MacRae	Get Me Home		Writer/Producer/Vocal Producer/Engineer/Guitars/Keyboards
2008	Run To You	Jade MacRae	Get Me Home		Writer/Producer/Vocal Producer/Engineer/Guitars/Keyboards
2008	Trouble	Jade MacRae	Get Me Home		Writer/Producer/Vocal Producer/Engineer/Guitars/Keyboards
2008	You're Gone	Jade MacRae	Get Me Home		Writer/Producer/Vocal Producer/Engineer/Guitars/Keyboards
2008	Under The Sheets	Jade MacRae	Get Me Home		Writer/Producer/Vocal Producer/Engineer/Guitars/Keyboards
2008	Final Chapter	Jade MacRae	Get Me Home		Writer/Producer/Vocal Producer/Engineer/Guitars/Keyboards
2008	Fly Away	Jade MacRae	Get Me Home		Writer/Producer/Vocal Producer/Engineer/Guitars/Keyboards
2007	Je Dis Stop	Priscilla	Casse Comme Du Verre	Top 100 Album (France)	Writer/Producer/Vocal Producer/Engineer/Keyboards
2007	Chante	Priscilla	Casse Comme Du Verre	Top 40 Single (France), Top 100 Album (France), No. 1 TV Show Theme Song (France)	Writer/Producer/Vocal Producer/Engineer/Keyboards
2007	Un Ami	Priscilla	Casse Comme Du Verre	Top 100 Album (France)	Writer/Producer/Vocal Producer/Engineer/Keyboards
2007	Pardon Me	The Grace	Graceful 4	Top 20 Album (Japan)	Writer/Producer/Vocal Producer/Engineer/Keyboards
2007	Glamorous	Natalia Ft. En Vogue	Everything & More	No. 1 Single (Belgium), No. 1 Album (Belgium), 2× Platinum Award	Writer/Producer
2007	Scream	Monrose		No. 1 Single (Germany)	Producer/Vocal Producer/Engineer/Keyboards/Mixing

=== Film and television ===
Year	Song title	Artist	Show
2018	I'm Alive	Nature's Way - Own The Morning Advert	
2017	I'm Alive	Coco - Disney/Pixar - Trailer	
2017	I'm Alive	Nature's Way - Own The Morning Advert	
2015	Blame It on the Beat	The Prancing Elites Project - Oxygen Network	
2014	I'm Alive	New Girl - Fox Network	
2013	Unstoppable	Chloe and Halle	Austin & Alley - Disney Channel

=== Video games ===
Year	Song title	Artist	Game Title
2013	I'm Alive	Michael Franti	The Sims 4 - EA
2013	I'm Alive	Michael Franti	Rayman Legends - Ubisoft

Other artists Adrian has worked with are:

- Michael Franti & Spearhead
- Hedley
- Plain White Tees
- Jesse McCartney
- Dannii Minogue
- BC Jean
- Brandyn Burnette
- JMSN
- Jackie Evancho
- Nikola Bedingfield
- Boys Like Girls
- Chris Medina
- En Vogue
- BoA
- 112
- D12
- Proof
- Horace Brown
- The Veronicas
- Oceana
- Kumi Koda
- KAT-TUN
- Monrose
- Josh Milan
- Tenjochiki
- No Angels
- Natalia
- Sabrina Carpenter
- Timomatic
- Josh Pyke
- Samantha Jade
- Ricki-Lee
- Emma-Louise Birdsall
- Elle Winter
- Chantelle Paige
- Mark Sholtez
- Jade Macrae
- Gordon Chambers
- Priscilla
