= Bric-a-brac (disambiguation) =

Bric-a-brac are curios, trinkets, or knick-knacks.

Bric-a-brac may also refer to:

- Bric à brac, 2005 album by Priscilla Betti
  - "Bric à brac" (song), eponymous song from the album
- Bric-a-Brac, British television series
