= Chris Carter =

Chris Carter may refer to:

== Music ==
- Chris Carter (American musician) (born 1959), American disc jockey and music/film producer
- Chris Carter (British musician) (born 1953), founding member of Throbbing Gristle
- Chris Carter or Von Pimpenstein, American record producer and mixer

== Politics ==
- Chris Carter (Missouri politician), Missouri state representative
- Chris Carter III (born 1981), Missouri state representative
- Chris Carter (New Zealand politician) (born 1952), former cabinet minister

== Sports ==
=== American football ===
- Chris Carter (defensive back) (born 1974)
- Chris Carter (linebacker) (born 1989)
- Chris Carter (wide receiver) (born 1987)

=== Other sports ===
- Chris Carter (runner) (born 1942), British middle-distance runner
- Chris Carter (outfielder) (born 1982), American former baseball right fielder
- Chris Carter (infielder) (born 1986), American baseball first baseman/designated hitter
- Chris Carter (triple jumper) (born 1989), American triple jumper
- Chris Carter (hurdler), winner of the 2011 distance medley relay at the NCAA Division I Indoor Track and Field Championships

== Other uses ==
- Chris Carter (screenwriter) (born 1956), American television screenwriter and producer who created The X-Files
- Chris Carter (actor) (born 1985), Canadian television screenwriter and actor

== See also ==
- Carter (name)
- Christopher Carter (disambiguation)
- Cris Carter (born 1965), American football Hall of Fame wide receiver
