= Never Gone (disambiguation) =

Never Gone is a 2005 album by the Backstreet Boys.

Never Gone may also refer to:

- Never Gone (film), a 2016 Chinese romantic drama film
- Never Gone (TV series), a 2018 Chinese streaming television series
- "Never Gone" (Colton Dixon song), 2012
- "Never Gone" (Andee song), 2014

== See also ==
- Never Gone Tour, the promotional concert tour accompanying the above-mentioned Backstreet Boys album
- Never Been Gone, a 2009 album by Carly Simon
