= Regarde-moi =

Regarde-moi may refer to:

- "Regarde-moi (teste-moi, déteste-moi)", a 2002 song by Priscilla
- "Regarde-moi", a song by Celine Dion from D'eux (1995)
- "Regarde-moi", a song by Kungs from Club Azur (2022)
- Regarde-moi, a 2023 album by Pierre de Maere
