= Bla bla bla (Priscilla song) =

Single by Priscilla

from the album Cette vie nouvelle
- Released: June 4, 2002
- Genre: Pop
- Length: 2:35
- Label: Jive 79253709
- Songwriter(s): Steve Mac, Jörgen Elofsson, Shetan
- Producer(s): Ghost

Priscilla singles chronology
"Cette vie nouvelle" (2002)	"Bla bla bla" (2002)	"Regarde-moi (teste-moi, déteste-moi)" (2002)

"Bla bla bla" is a song by French singer Priscilla from her debut album Cette vie nouvelle. The song was released as a single that came out simultaneously with the album in June 2002.

== Track listing ==
CD single (Jive 79253709)
No.	Title	Length
1.	"Bla bla bla"	2:35
2.	"Quand je serai jeune" (Instrumental)	4:09

Extras
No.	Title	Length
1.	"Quand je serai jeune" (Video)

== Charts ==
Chart (2002)	Peak position
Belgium (Ultratip Bubbling Under Wallonia)	11
France (SNEP)	37
