= La vie sait =

Studio album by Priscilla Betti
- Released: May 19, 2017
- Genre: Pop
- Language: French
- Label: Capitol Music France (Universal Music Group)

Priscilla Betti chronology
Casse comme du verre (2007)	La vie sait (2017)

Singles from La vie sait
- 1. "Changer le monde" Released: December 2016; 2. "La vie sait" Released: January 27, 2017

La vie sait is the sixth studio album by French singer Priscilla Betti, released by Capitol Music France on May 19, 2017.

The album debuted at number 35 in France.

== Track listing ==
CD (Capitol 576 173 4)
No.	Title	Length
1.	"Changer le monde"	3:11
2.	"La vie sait"	3:17
3.	"T'es beau mais t'es toi"	3:01
4.	"Je rêve encore"	2:56
5.	"Au fil de ma vie"	3:09
6.	"Nuits blanches"	2:57
7.	"On pourrait"	3:03
8.	"Amnésie"	2:53
9.	"Le cœur au sud"	3:19
10.	"Laissez-moi rêver"	2:55
11.	"Regarde-moi (teste-moi, déteste-moi)" (Version acoustique)	3:18
12.	"What a Feeling"	3:03

== Charts ==
Chart (2017)	Peak position
Belgian Albums (Ultratop Wallonia)	102
French Albums (SNEP)	35
