= Anything (Hedley song) =

- Canadian single cover

Single by Hedley

from the album Wild Life
- Released: August 19, 2013
- Recorded: 2013
- Genre: Pop
- Length: 3:11
- Label: Universal Canada; Capitol
- Songwriters: Jacob Hoggard; Brian Howes; Jason Van Poederooyen
- Producers: Brian Howes; Jacob Hoggard

Hedley singles chronology
"Kiss You Inside Out" (2012)	"Anything" (2013)	"Crazy for You" (2014)

Alternative cover
- US EP and international single cover

"Anything" is a song recorded by Canadian pop rock band Hedley for their fifth studio album, Wild Life (2013). The song was written and produced by Jacob Hoggard and Brian Howes, with additional writing by Jason Van Poederooyen. It was released to Canadian radio on August 19, 2013, through Universal Music Canada as the album's lead single. "Anything" was serviced to alternative radio in the US through Capitol Records in November 2013 as the band's fifth American single.

Upon release, "Anything" was met with mixed reviews from music critics, but performed well commercially. The song peaked at number 5 on the Canadian Hot 100 and reached the top 10 on three national airplay charts. It also charted at 18 in New Zealand. In September 2016, "Anything" was certified 4× Platinum by Music Canada, making it the band's fastest and best-selling single to date. The group performed the song at the 2013 Grey Cup half-time show.

== Composition ==
"Anything" is a pop song composed in the key of G and set to a BPM of 76. Building on the motivational themes of earlier Hedley singles like "Invincible" and "One Life", its lyrics convey a message of resilience and self-belief, encouraging listeners to pursue their goals regardless of societal pressure. The song's bridge features a quote from Canadian hockey player Wayne Gretzky: "You miss a hundred percent of the shots you never take."

== Critical reception ==
Emma Garland at Alter The Press! gave the song a mixed review, feeling that although "Anything" is "insanely catchy", the "uh-uh, fuck that" hook is "awkward" and "quickly gets irritating". Philip Lickley at UK music blog All-Noise described the song as "a stadium-friendly chanting song... with a strong message" that "screams out for radio play", and rated it a 7 out of 10. The single was nominated for two awards at the 2014 Juno Awards: Video of the Year and Producer of the Year.

== Music video ==
The music video for "Anything" was directed by JP Poliquin and was shot at The Great Hall in Toronto, Ontario. It premiered on the band's VEVO channel on September 10, 2013. Speaking about the video, Hoggard stated, "In the spirt of the concept of the song, we were like, 'Hang on, f--k, this, let's just do whatever the f--k we want. I think that would almost be the truest form of expressing the sentimentality of that song in video form.'"

== Awards and nominations ==
Awards and nominations for "Anything"
Year	Organization	Award	Result	Ref(s)
2014	MuchMusic Video Awards	Video of the Year	Won	
2014	MuchMusic Video Awards	Director of the Year	Nominated	
2014	MuchMusic Video Awards	Pop Video of the Year	Won	
2014	MuchMusic Video Awards	Your Fave Video of the Year	Won	
2014	Juno Awards	Video of the Year	Nominated	
2014	Juno Awards	Producer of the Year	Nominated	
2014	SOCAN Awards	No. 1 Song Award	Won	

== Track listings ==
Digital download – single
No.	Title	Writer(s)	Length
1.	"Anything"	Jacob Hoggard; Brian Howes; Jason Van Poederooyen	3:10

US Digital EP
No.	Title	Writer(s)	Length
1.	"Anything"	Hoggard; Howes; Van Poederooyen	3:10
2.	"Headphones"	Hoggard; Howes; Ryan Petersen; Nolan Sipe	3:33
3.	"I'll Be with You"	Lucas Banker; Hoggard; Patrick Nissley; Matt Squire	3:10
4.	"Mexico"	Hoggard; Ennio Morricone; Adrian Newman	3:46
5.	"Heaven in Our Headlights"	Hoggard; Howes; Sipe	3:09
Total length:			16:50

== Charts ==
=== Weekly charts ===
Weekly chart performance for "Anything"
Chart (2013–14)	Peak position
Canada (Canadian Hot 100)	5
Canada AC (Billboard)	6
Canada CHR/Top 40 (Billboard)	6
Canada Hot AC (Billboard)	5
New Zealand (Recorded Music NZ)	18

=== Year-end charts ===
Year-end chart performance for "Anything"
Chart (2013)	Position
Canada (Canadian Hot 100)	68
Chart (2014)	Position
Canada (Canadian Hot 100)	42
Canada AC (Billboard)	37

== Certifications ==
Certifications and sales for "Anything"
Region	Certification	Certified units/sales
Canada (Music Canada)	4× Platinum	320,000^{‡}
New Zealand (RMNZ)	Gold	7,500^{*}
^{*} Sales figures based on certification alone.^{‡} Sales+streaming figures based on certification alone.

== Release history ==
Release dates and formats for "Anything"
Region	Date	Format	Label	Ref.
Canada	August 19, 2013	Radio airplay	Universal Music Canada	
Canada	September 17, 2013	Digital download	Universal Music Canada	
Worldwide	November 12, 2013	Digital download	Capitol Records	
United States	November 18, 2013	Alternative radio	Capitol Records	
United States	December 3, 2013	Digital extended play	Capitol Records	
United Kingdom	June 2, 2014	CD single	Universal Music Canada	
