= Nikki Cleary (album) =

Studio album by Nikki Cleary
- Released: August 5, 2003 (United States)
- Recorded: 2002–2003
- Genre: Pop rock, teen pop
- Label: Jive
- Producer: Douglas Carr, Jeff Coplan, Kara DioGuardi, Nick Foster, David Frank, Steve Kipner, Kevin Paige, Guy Roche, Mike Rose, Supaflyas, Fredrik Thomander, Anders Wikström

Nikki Cleary chronology
Everything I Wished For (2002)	Nikki Cleary (2003)

Professional ratings
Review scores
Source	Rating
Allmusic	3/5 stars

Nikki Cleary is a self-titled album by Nikki Cleary released in 2003.

The song "Summertime Guys" was featured in the episode "The Golden Years" of Kim Possible in 2003, and was a track on the Kim Possible soundtrack. It was also featured in the film Aquamarine.

The song "1-2-3" was featured in the film Confessions of a Teenage Drama Queen, the Lizzie McGuire: Total Party! album and on the second volume of the 2003 Nickelodeon Kids Choice Awards promotional albums.

== Track listing ==
No.	Title	Writer(s)	Length
1.	"The Game"	David Frank, Steve Kipner, Pamela Sheyne	3:47
2.	"You're the One That I Want" (with Chris Trousdale)	John Farrar	3:31
3.	"1-2-3"	Kara DioGuardi, Jörgen Elofsson	3:27
4.	"Summertime Guys"	Nikki Cleary, Jeff Coplan, Robert Ellis Orrall	3:06
5.	"Fish Out of Water"	Shaunna Bolton, Ron Harris, Anthony Mazza	3:23
6.	"Sorry for Myself"	Phil Barnhart, Kevin Paige, Bob Regan	2:50
7.	"I Miss You (It's Weird that You Don't Notice)"	Amy Powers, Guy Roche	3:49
8.	"Walking on Sunshine"	Kimberley Rew	3:42
9.	"Irresistible"	DioGuardi, Fredrik Thomander, Anders Wikström	3:18
10.	"When Will I Get Over You (Getting Over Me)"	Bolton, Harris, Mazza	3:57
