= Kiss You Inside Out =

Single by Hedley

from the album Storms
- Released: May 17, 2012
- Recorded: 2012
- Genre: Pop; pop rock
- Length: 3:36
- Label: Universal; Island
- Songwriters: Brandyn Burnette; Lauren Christy; Adrian Newman
- Producer: Adrian Newman

Hedley singles chronology
"One Life" (2011)	"Kiss You Inside Out" (2012)	"Anything" (2013)

Music video
- "Kiss You Inside Out" on YouTube

"Kiss You Inside Out" is a song recorded by Canadian pop rock band Hedley, featured on a re-issue of their 2012 album Storms. It was written by Brandyn Burnette, Lauren Christy, and Adrian Newman, and was produced by Newman. The song was first released in Canada through Universal Music Canada as the album's third single on May 17, 2012 and was subsequently released in the United States on June 12, 2012, as the album's lead single in that market. "Kiss You Inside Out" was also serviced to American hot adult contemporary radio on June 18, 2012.

Featuring prominent pop music influences and suggestive lyrics, the song epitomizes Hedley's musical shift away from the rock and pop punk leanings of their earlier work. Having been certified 3× Platinum by Music Canada and reaching the No. 2 position on the Canadian Hot 100, "Kiss You Inside Out" is the group's most successful single to date. It is also their second hit on the Billboard Adult Pop Songs chart, where it peaked at 24, and first to hit number one on the Canadian adult contemporary chart.

A franglais version featuring Canadian singer-songwriter Andee (credited as Andrée-Anne Leclerc) was released June 26, 2012 and appears on Leclerc's debut studio album, Black and White Heart (2015). This version features additional songwriting by Marc Dupré.

== Composition ==
"Kiss You Inside Out" is a pop rock song originally composed in the key of E♭ major. According to the digital sheet music published by Universal Music Publishing Group, it is set in common time to a "moderate rock" tempo of approximately 120 BPM. The song is instrumented primarily by guitar, but also incorporates synthesizers and a dance beat, and features a three-octave vocal range of B♭_{3}–D_{6}. Lyrically, the song explores the concepts of physical intimacy and sexual exploration.

== Background and release ==
While promoting the pending U.S. release of their Storms album, Hedley began collaborating with pop writers and producers on new material, including The Matrix member Lauren Christy. The fruit of one of these sessions was "Kiss You Inside Out", which features a more radio-friendly pop feel than much of their earlier work, and which they decided to release as a single. Bolstered by the single's positive reception, the band added "Kiss You Inside Out" to the track listing of the U.S. edition of Storms, and re-issued the album in Canada to include it. The song was serviced to Canadian radio on May 17, 2012 and released to digital retailers in Canada on May 22, 2012. In the United States, where "Kiss You Inside Out" served as the album's first and only single, it was released digitally on June 12, 2012 and then serviced to radio on June 18, 2012.

On June 26, 2012 a franglais version of "Kiss You Inside Out" was released to iTunes Canada featuring guest vocals from Francophone singer Andrée-Anne Leclerc. Some of the lyrics were translated or re-interpreted in French for Leclerc's parts, most evidently in the refrain. The "version française" of the song is featured on the deluxe edition of Leclerc's debut studio album, Black and White Heart (2015).

== Reception ==
=== Critical ===
"Kiss You Inside Out" was nominated for Single of the Year at the 2013 Juno Awards, but lost to Carly Rae Jepsen's breakout hit, "Call Me Maybe".

=== Commercial ===
"Kiss You Inside Out" debuted at number 35 on the Billboard Canadian Hot 100 chart dated June 9, 2012. It rose 10 positions to enter the top 5 on the July 7 chart, earning the distinction of "airplay gainer" for the week. The song reached its peak position of 2 on the chart dated August 25, 2012, held off the top spot by Katy Perry's "Wide Awake". "Kiss You Inside Out" is both the band's highest-charting and best-selling song to date (as of June 2016). The single has been certified 3× Platinum by Music Canada, selling over 240,000 copies by November 2012. On the Hot Canadian Digital Songs component chart, "Kiss You Inside Out" peaked at number 3 on the chart dated July 14, 2012. The song was a radio hit, reaching the top 10 of the Canada CHR/Top 40 and Canada Hot AC charts and additionally reaching number one on Canada AC. "Kiss You Inside Out" was the seventh most-played song on Canadian radio in 2012, according to Nielsen Company.

"Kiss You Inside Out" is the band's second song to chart in the United States, where it impacted the Adult Pop Songs chart monitored by Billboard. It eventually peaked on the same at number 24 on the chart dated October 20, 2012.

== Awards and nominations ==
Awards and nominations for "Kiss You Inside Out"
Year	Organization	Award	Result	Ref(s)
2013	MuchMusic Video Awards	Best Pop Video of the Year	Nominated	
2013	MuchMusic Video Awards	Your Fave Video of the Year	Nominated	
2013	Juno Awards	Single of the Year	Nominated	

== Music video ==
An accompanying music video for "Kiss You Inside Out" was directed by Lisa Mann and filmed in Toronto, ON. It premiered July 18, 2012. The video begins with a car crash and chronicles the relationship that later develops between the two drivers after meeting. Its premise has been described as "the world's most dangerous meet-cute."

== Charts ==
=== Weekly charts ===
Weekly chart performance for "Kiss You Inside Out"
Chart (2012–13)	Peak position
Canada (Canadian Hot 100)	2
Canada AC (Billboard)	1
Canada CHR/Top 40 (Billboard)	7
Canada Hot AC (Billboard)	4
US Adult Top 40 (Billboard)	24

=== Year-end charts ===
Year-end chart performance for "Kiss You Inside Out"
Chart (2012)	Position
Canada (Canadian Hot 100)	19
Chart (2013)	Position
Canada (Canadian Hot 100)	83

== Certifications ==
Certifications and sales for "Kiss You Inside Out"
Region	Certification	Certified units/sales
Canada (Music Canada)	3× Platinum	240,000^{*}
^{*} Sales figures based on certification alone.

== Release history ==
Release dates and formats for "Kiss You Inside Out"
Region	Date	Format	Label	Ref.
Canada	May 17, 2012	Radio airplay	Universal	
Canada	May 22, 2012	Digital download	Universal	
United States	June 12, 2012	Digital download	Universal	
United States	June 18, 2012	Hot adult contemporary radio	Island	
United States	October 16, 2012	Contemporary hit radio	Island	
