= Crazy for You (Hedley song) =

Single by Hedley

from the album Wild Life
- Released: January 20, 2014
- Genre: Disco
- Length: 3:37; 3:21 (radio edit)
- Label: Universal; Capitol
- Songwriter(s): Jacob Hoggard; Brian Howes; Jason Van Poederooyen
- Producer(s): Brian Howes; Jacob Hoggard

Hedley singles chronology
"Anything" (2013)	"Crazy for You" (2014)	"Heaven in Our Headlights" (2014)

Music video
- "Crazy for You" on YouTube

"Crazy for You" is a song recorded by Canadian pop rock band Hedley for their fifth studio album, Wild Life (2013). It was made available for purchase on iTunes on October 22, 2013, as a promotional single supporting pre-orders of the album. The song was released as the second official single off the album on January 20, 2014, through Universal Music Canada. It was a success in Canada, reaching the top 10 and selling over 166,000 copies. In the US, "Crazy for You" was served to hot adult contemporary radio through Capitol Records on March 17, 2014.

== Composition ==
"Crazy for You" was written by Jacob Hoggard, Brian Howes and Jason Van Poederooyen. It was co-produced by Hoggard along with Howes. Lyrically, the song is a love song to a woman of questionable mental faculties. Musically, the track is described as disco, drawing comparisons to Daft Punk's "Get Lucky". Hoggard said the track was inspired by "old school Michael Jackson and Stevie Wonder."

== Music video ==
The official music video for "Crazy for You" was directed by J. Lee Williams and Timur Musabay, and premiered on February 14, 2014. Inspired by the 1988 film They Live, it depicts the band members escaping a psychiatric hospital, only to find that the outside world is not as they remember. The video was nominated for Post-Production Video of the Year at the 2014 MMVAs, but lost to City and Colour's "Thirst".

== Awards and nominations ==
Awards and nominations for "Crazy for You"
Year	Organization	Award	Result	Ref(s)
2014	SOCAN Awards	No. 1 Song Award	Won	
2014	MuchMusic Video Awards	Post-Production of the Year	Nominated	
2014	Juno Awards	Producer of the Year	Nominated	
2015	Juno Awards	Single of the Year	Nominated	
2015	Canadian Radio Music Awards	Song of the Year	Nominated	
2015	SOCAN Awards	Pop/Rock Music Award	Won	

== Track listing ==
Digital download
No.	Title	Length
1.	"Crazy for You"	3:37

UK CD single
No.	Title	Length
1.	"Crazy for You" (Radio edit)	3:21
2.	"Radio ID"	0:04
3.	"Song Intro"	0:10

== Charts ==
=== Weekly charts ===
Weekly chart performance for "Crazy for You"
Chart (2014)	Peak position
Australia Hitseekers (ARIA)	7
Canada (Canadian Hot 100)	7
Canada AC (Billboard)	8
Canada CHR/Top 40 (Billboard)	5
Canada Hot AC (Billboard)	5

=== Year-end charts ===
Year-end chart performance for "Crazy for You"
Chart (2014)	Position
Canada (Canadian Hot 100)	22

== Certifications ==
Certifications and sales for "Crazy for You"
Region	Certification	Certified units/sales
Canada (Music Canada)	2× Platinum	166,000

== Release history ==
Release dates and formats for "Crazy for You"
Region	Date	Format	Label	Ref.
Canada	October 22, 2013	Digital download	Universal Music Canada	
Canada	January 20, 2014	Radio airplay	Universal Music Canada	
Oman	February 5, 2014	Digital download	Universal Music Canada	
United States	March 17, 2014	Hot adult contemporary radio	Capitol Records	
