= Toujours pas d'amour =

Single by Priscilla Betti

from the album Une fille comme moi
- B-side: "Toujours pas d'amour (Remix)"
- Released: 3 February 2004
- Recorded: France
- Genre: Pop
- Length: 3:33
- Label: Jive
- Songwriter(s): Bertrand Châtenet; Philippe Osman
- Producer(s): Patrick Debort; Denys Limon

Priscilla Betti singles chronology
"Tchouk tchouk musik" (2003)	"Toujours pas d'amour" (2004)	"Toi c'est moi" (2004)

Music video
- "Toujours pas d'amour" on YouTube

"Toujours pas d'amour" is a song recorded by French singer Priscilla Betti. It was released on February 3, 2004 in France, Switzerland and Belgium (Wallonia) as the first single from her third album Une fille comme moi. The single reached the top five on the French singles chart and was certified Silver by the SNEP.

== Writing and music video ==
As for Priscilla's previous singles, the song was composed by Philippe Osman (music, arrangements) and Bertrand Châtenet (lyrics, mixing), who had also worked for Mylène Farmer.

The music video was partly produced as an animated feature. Priscilla is in the street with her friends and takes people she meets in a party in which they become animated characters.

The remix featuring as second track on the CD single is also available on the album Une Fille comme moi, as eleventh track.

== Chart performance ==
In France, "Toujours pas d'amour" started at number 17 on 1 February 2004, then climbed in the top ten and reached a peak of number five in its fourth week, then almost did not stop to drop on the chart. It totalled five weeks in the top ten, 16 weeks in the top 50 and 22 weeks in the top 100. It was certified Silver disc by the Syndicat National de l'Édition Phonographique, and ranked at number 47 on the year-end chart. In the Wallonia region of Belgium, the single charted for 15 weeks from 21 February 2004, peaking at number 21 in the seventh week. With this single, Priscilla achieved her highest position in Switzerland, charting for 11 weeks on the singles chart, with four weeks in the top 50, and a peak at number 39 in the fifth week on 14 March 2004.

== Track listing ==
No.	Title	Length
1.	"Toujours pas d'amour"	3:33
2.	"Toujours pas d'amour" (remix)	3:26

== Personnel ==
- Lyrics by Bertrand Châtenet
- Music by Philippe Osman
- Arrangement, programmation and all instruments by Philippe Osman
- Mixing by Bertrand Châtenet
- Vocals by Priscilla
- Remixed version by Ghost
- Produced by B.Châtenet, P.Osman and P.Debort
- Produced by Patrick Debort and Denys Limon for Cap Mistral Corporation
- Edited by Mache Prod
- Recorded at Guillaume Tell and Mega studios in Suresnes

== Charts ==
=== Weekly charts ===
Weekly charts for "Toujours pas d'amour"
Chart (2004)	Peak position
Belgium (Ultratop 50 Wallonia)	21
Europe (European Hot 100 Singles)	19
France (SNEP)	5
Switzerland (Schweizer Hitparade)	39

=== Year-end charts ===
Year-end charts for "Toujours pas d'amour"
Chart (2004)	Position
Belgium (Ultratop 50 Wallonia)	82
France (SNEP)	47

== Certifications ==
Certifications for "Toujours pas d'amour"
Region	Certification	Certified units/sales
France (SNEP)	Gold	200,000^{*}
^{*} Sales figures based on certification alone.
