= Jalousie (Priscilla song) =

Single by Priscilla

from the album Une fille comme moi
- Released: September 2004
- Genre: Pop
- Length: 3:51
- Label: Jive 82876 64482 2
- Songwriter(s): Bertrand Châtenet, Philippe Osman
- Producer(s): Bertrand Châtenet, Philippe Osman, Patrick Debort

Priscilla singles chronology
"Toi c'est moi" (2004)	"Jalousie" (2004)	"Bric à brac" (2005)

"Jalousie" is a song by French singer Priscilla from her third album Une fille comme moi. The song reached number 21 in France.

It was the third and last single from that album. The album came out in February 2004, and the single seven months later, in September.

== Track listing ==
All tracks are written by Philippe Osman, Patrick Debort and Patrick Debort

CD single (Jive 82876 64482 2)
No.	Title	Length
1.	"Jalousie" (Remix)	3:51
2.	"Une fille comme moi"	4:05
3.	"Jalousie" (Instrumental)	3:51

== Charts ==
Chart (2004)	Peak position
Belgium (Ultratip Bubbling Under Wallonia)	5
France (SNEP)	21
