= Chris Carter III =

American politician (born 1981)

Chris Carter

Member of the Missouri House of Representatives from the 76th district
- In office January 9, 2019 – January 2021
- Preceded by: Joshua Peters
- Succeeded by: Marlon Anderson

Personal details
- Born: Willie Christopher Carter III; September 18, 1981 (age 44)
- Party: Democratic

Willie Christopher Carter III (born September 18, 1981) is an American politician who served as a member of the Missouri House of Representatives for the 76th district from 2019 to 2021.
