= Christopher Carter =

Christopher Carter may refer to:

- Christopher Carter (cricketer) (born 1997), Hong Kong cricketer
- Christopher Benfield Carter (1844–1906), Canadian politician

== See also ==
- Chris Carter (disambiguation)
