= Black and White Heart =

Studio album by Andee
- Released: May 26, 2015
- Recorded: 2013–14 in Montréal, QC (Man of the Hour Studio, Fever Music Group)
- Genres: Pop; rock; soul
- Length: 54:28
- Languages: English; French
- Label: Universal Canada
- Producer: Sébastien Lefebvre

Andee chronology
Black and White Heart (2015)	One (2019)

Singles from Black and White Heart
- 1. "Never Gone" Released: May 19, 2014; 2. "Sorries" Released: October 21, 2014; 3. "Black and White Heart" Released: May 25, 2015; 4. "Tu Enflammes Mon Corps" Released: August 21, 2015

Black and White Heart is the debut studio album recorded by Canadian singer-songwriter Andee, released May 26, 2015 through Universal Music Canada. Primarily an English-language album, the deluxe edition includes four tracks recorded in French to reflect Andee's heritage as a French Canadian. Musically, the album incorporates elements of pop, rock, and soul. Sébastien Lefebvre, best known as a member of Simple Plan, produced the album and also co-wrote nine of the thirteen songs; Andee is credited as a writer (under her birth name Andrée-Anne Leclerc) on eight tracks.

The album received generally positive reviews upon release, with critics noting Andee's "powerhouse" vocals and unique sound. It entered the Billboard Canadian Albums Chart at number sixteen on the chart dated June 6, 2015. On iTunes Canada, the album reached as high as number four on the pop sales chart. The album has produced three singles, including the top-forty-peaking lead single "Never Gone".

== Background ==
In 2012, Andrée-Anne Leclerc auditioned for the fifth edition of the Québecois reality singing competition Star Académie, where she eventually placed in the top eight. On the show, she was discovered by Paul Jessop, the vice-president of promotions at Universal Music Canada, who requested her to perform the French vocals for the "Version Française" of Universal-signed band Hedley's hit single "Kiss You Inside Out", released in June 2012. This version is included on the deluxe edition of Black and White Heart. Leclerc encountered Simple Plan guitarist Sébastien Lefebvre in the spring of 2013, who reportedly knew upon hearing her for the first time that Leclerc had the ability to "touch people deeply with her music," and the two decided to work together on her debut studio album. In January 2014, Leclerc adopted the stage name Andee (an anglophone derivative of her birth name, Andrée-Anne) and signed a record deal with Universal Music Canada and a management deal with Coalition Music.

Recorded principally between the summers of 2013 and 2014, Black and White Heart is executive produced by Lefebvre and features mostly songs written by Lefebvre and/or Andee. The song "Sorries" was written for Andee by Pink, Kara Dioguardi and The New Royales, while "Beautiful Bullet" from the deluxe edition was initially intended to be recorded by its co-writer Anjulie. Described as pop rock with a blend of soul, the album's sound was developed by merging Lefebvre and Andee's musical influences. Black and White Heart became available for pre-order on May 12, 2015 and was released May 26, 2015.

== Singles ==
"Never Gone" serves as the album's lead single and was released to digital retailers in both English and French versions on May 19, 2014. Its music video, directed by Alon Isocianu, premiered June 26, 2014. "Never Gone" entered the Billboard Canadian Hot 100 at number ninety-four for the week of June 28, 2014 and rose to its peak position of forty for the week of August 23, 2014. It saw the most commercial success at adult contemporary radio, where it reached a peak airplay position of six.

The second single was "Sorries," released digitally on October 21, 2014. The song was co-written by Pink, Kara DioGuardi, and Canadian-American music group The New Royales as a "gift" welcoming Andee to the industry. It is the only track on the standard edition on which neither Andee nor Lefebvre collaborated. "Sorries" peaked at a moderate position of fifty-three on the Canadian Hot 100.

The title track, "Black and White Heart," was released as the album's third single. It impacted Canadian adult contemporary radio on May 25, 2015 in conjunction with the album's release and has so far risen to a position of 30 on the AC airplay chart.

"Tu Enflammes Mon Corps" was released in August 2015 as the album's second francophone single (following the Version Française of "Never Gone") and the fourth single from the album overall.

== Track listing ==
Black and White Heart — Standard edition
No.	Title	Writer(s)	Length
1.	"If You Want Me"	Jaren Cerf; Andrée-Anne Leclerc; Sébastien Lefebvre	0:32
2.	"Bit O' Love"	J. Cerf; Leclerc; S. Lefebvre	2:41
3.	"Never Gone"	Leclerc; S. Lefebvre	2:51
4.	"Hope"	Leclerc; S. Lefebvre	3:10
5.	"Mute"	Leclerc	3:39
6.	"Black and White Heart"	Arnold Lanni; Leclerc; S. Lefebvre	3:49
7.	"Unblind Me"	J. Cerf; Andy Duguid; Jean-François Lefebvre; S. Lefebvre	3:40
8.	"Sorries"	Erik Alcok; Kara DioGuardi; Pranam Injeti; Alecia Moore; Khalil Abdul Rahman	3:36
9.	"For Better or Worse"	J. Cerf; S. Lefebvre	3:47
10.	"Calling"	J. Cerf; Leclerc; J. Lefebvre; S. Lefebvre	3:16
11.	"Let 'Em Talk"	J. Cerf; Matt Cerf; J. Lefebvre; S. Lefebvre	3:46

Black and White Heart — Deluxe edition (bonus tracks)
No.	Title	Writer(s)	Length
12.	"Beautiful Bullet"	Marc Nelkin; Laura Pergolizzi; Anjulie Persaud; Carl Ryden	3:02
13.	"Black and White Heart" (Lesko Cerf Remix)	Lanni; Leclerc; S. Lefebvre	3:15
14.	"Never Gone" (Version Française)	Leclerc; S. Lefebvre	2:52
15.	"Tu Enflammes Mon Corps"	Leclerc	3:14
16.	"Kiss You Inside Out (Note: "Kiss You Inside Out" is credited to Hedley featuring Andrée-Anne Leclerc.)" (Version Française)	Brandyn Burnette; Lauren Christy; Marc Dupré; Adrian Newman	3:38
17.	"Black and White Heart" (Version Française)	Lanni; Leclerc; S. Lefebvre	3:47

- All songs produced by Sébastien Lefebvre, except for
  - "Beautiful Bullet," produced by Lefebvre and Carl Ryden, and
  - "Kiss You Inside Out," produced by Adrian Newman, with vocals produced by Brian Howes (English vocals) and Marc Dupré (French vocals).

== Credits and personnel ==
Credits adapted from liner notes. (Note: Credits denoted by (16) refer exclusively to track 16, i.e. "Kiss You Inside Out".)

Recorded and mixed at

- Acton Vale, Québec (Power Plant Studio)
- Montréal, Québec (Man of the Hour Studio, Fever Music Group)
- Virginia Beach, Virginia (Mixstar Studio)

Performance credits

- All vocals – Andee / Andrée-Anne Leclerc
  - Background vocals – Jaren Cerf, Jean-François Lefebvre, Sébastien Lefebvre
  - Lead vocals (Hedley) – Jacob Hoggard

Instruments

- Bass – Sébastien Lefebvre
- Cello – Christine Giguère
- Drums – Chris Crippin (16)
- Guitar – Jacob Hoggard (16), Sébastien Lefebvre, Dave Rosin (16)
- Keyboards and piano – Jay Lefebvre, Sébastien Lefebvre, Adrian Newman (16)
  - Additional keyboards – Brian Howes (16)
- Violin – Chantal Bergeron, Nathalie Bonin
  - Violin alto – Brian Bacon

Production

- A&R – Paul Jessop
- Arrangement – Sébastien Lefebvre
  - String arrangement – Andrée-Anne Leclerc, Jay Lefebvre, Sébastien Lefebvre
- Art director and designer – Susan Michalek
- Digital editor – Adrian Newman (16)
- Engineers – Frank Joly, Sébastien Lefebvre, Adrian Newman (16)
  - Vocal engineers – Jean-Sebastien Fournier (16), Jay Van Poederooyen (16)
- Management – Coalition Music Toronto (Eric Lawrence, Rob Lanni)
- Mastering – Matt Cerf, Ted Jensen (16), Ryan Morey
- Mixers – Serban Ghenea, Frank Joley, Tony Maseratti
- Photographer – Crila Photo
- Record producer – Sébastien Lefebvre, Adrian Newman (16), Carl Ryden
  - Vocal producer – Brian Howes (16), Marc Dupré (16)
- Programming – Sébastien Lefebvre, Adrian Newman (16)
- Recording – Sébastien Lefebvre
  - Assistant recording – Jay Lefebvre
  - Strings recording – Patrick Goyette
- Remixer – Lesko Cerf
- Songwriters – Erik Alcok, Brandyn Burnette, Jaren Cerf, Matt Cerf, Lauren Christy, Kara DioGuardi, Andy Duguid, Marc Dupré, Pranam Injeti, Arnold Lanni, Andrée-Anne Leclerc, Sébastien Lefebvre, Alecia Moore, Marc Nelkin, Adrian Newman, Laura Pergolizzi, Anjulie Persaud, Khalil Abdul Rahman, Carl Ryden
- Translator – Andrée-Anne Leclerc, Sébastien Lefebvre, Nelson Minville (16)

== Charts ==
Chart (2015)	Peak position
Canadian Albums (Billboard)	16
