= Tchouk tchouk musik =

Single by Priscilla Betti

from the album Priscilla
- B-side: "Petit Navire"
- Released: 15 April 2003
- Recorded: France
- Genre: Pop
- Length: 3:24
- Label: Jive
- Songwriter(s): Bertrand Châtenet; Philippe Osman
- Producer(s): Bertrand Châtenet; Philippe Osman; Patrick Debor

Priscilla Betti singles chronology
"Regarde-moi (teste-moi, déteste-moi)" (2002)	"Tchouk tchouk musik" (2003)	"Toujours pas d'amour" (2004)

"Tchouk tchouk musik" is a song recorded by French singer Priscilla Betti. It was released on 15 April 2003 in France, Switzerland and Belgium (Wallonia) as the second single from her second album Priscilla. It reached number seven on the French singles chart and received a Silver disc certification. Philippe Osman (music) and Bertrand Châtenet (lyrics) participated in the composition and the production of the single. Osman also made all the arrangements and performed the background vocals with Priscilla, while Châtenet mixed the song. In the music video, Priscilla can be shown dancing and performing a choreography on a beach, surrendered by many people.

== Chart performance ==
In France, "Tchouk tchouk musik" started at number 24 on 19 April 2003, then reached the top ten the next week and peaked at number seven in the fourth week. The single totaled three weeks in the top ten, 22 weeks in the top 50 and 33 weeks in the top 100. It was eventually certified Silver disc by the Syndicat National de l'Édition Phonographique, and ranked at 49th on the Annual Chart.

== Track listing ==
- CD single

No.	Title	Length
1.	"Tchouk tchouk musik" (groove mix)	3:24
2.	"Petit Navire"	4:28
3.	"Priscilla t'apprend la chorégraphie" (bonus video)

- Digital download

No.	Title	Length
1.	"Tchouk tchouk musik"	3:24

== Personnel ==
- Lyrics by Bertrand Châtenet
- Music by Philippe Osman
- Arrangement, programmation and all instruments by Philippe Osman
- Mixing by Bertrand Châtenet and Jérôme Devoise
- Mastered by André Perriat at Top Master studio
- Vocals by Priscilla and Philippe Osman
- Produced by B.Châtenet, P.Osman and P.Debort

== Charts ==
=== Weekly charts ===
Weekly charts for "Tchouk tchouk musik"
Chart (2003)	Peak position
Belgium (Ultratop 50 Wallonia)	38
France (SNEP)	7
Switzerland (Schweizer Hitparade)	47

=== Year-end charts ===
Year-end charts for "Tchouk tchouk musik"
Chart (2003)	Position
France (SNEP)	49

== Certifications ==
Certifications for "Tchouk tchouk musik"
Region	Certification	Certified units/sales
France (SNEP)	Silver	125,000^{*}
^{*} Sales figures based on certification alone.
