= Von Pimpenstein =

Chris Carter
- Also known as: Von Pimpenstein
- Born: Christopher Carter
- Genres: Pop, R&B, Hip-Hop, Rock
- Occupations: Record Producer and Mix Engineer
- Instruments: Producer, Mixer, Engineer, Songwriter
- Labels: Universal, EMI
- Website: http://www.vonpimpenstein.com

Chris Carter, known professionally as Von Pimpenstein, is an American record producer and mixer from Los Angeles, California, United States.

== Professional career ==
Chris Carter grew up in Eugene, Oregon, where he made his first professional recordings in high school as a founding member of the then popular local band The Boogie Patrol Express. He started in the music business producing a single for the then unsigned Backstreet Boys in 1993. The single caught the attention of Mercury Records A&R executive Dave McPherson who signed the group and later moved to Jive Records/BMG. Upon learning that Chris Carter and the other two writer/producers of the song, Aaron Walker and Blake Schwab, were not credited and that Lou Pearlman’s label Transcontinental Records had not obtained the rights necessary to release the song under the Jive label, BMG delayed a 1994 U.S. debut until 1997 while successfully promoting the boy band in Europe in the interim. The three writers settled with Lou Pearlman for an undisclosed sum.

In 2000 Carter produced and mixed the DJ Times Top 40 single “Rub A Dub Dub” for Filipina singer Yvette. During this time he also ran the label Say Music Inc. with Yvette's husband and manager Joe Desciongco. Desciongco and Carter later entered Say Music Inc. into a joint venture deal with Universal Records.

In 2001 Carter produced and mixed the single "Love Goes On" for singer Natalise which was placed on the 888 Records compilation “Import Jams” (2002) and launched her career. The DMA Magazine top 10 single made Natalise very popular in the United States earning her a record deal with 888 Records and was also released on her album “Forever Now” (2003). Carter continued to produce Natalise on her second album, “I Came To Play,” (2005) producing and mixing the DJ Times Top 40 hit radio singles “Make It Clap Now” and “Get Me Off”, the latter of which was featured in a Dodge Charger commercial, was played on MTV, and earned Natalise nationwide popularity bringing her to the high-point of her career. Also in 2005, Carter produced the remix to American Idol finalist Jasmine Trias’s single “Excuses” for Universal Records.

Carter is first credited with the nickname “Von Pimpenstein” on the self-titled album by Stormy Strong (2006) which received awards from Billboard. In 2007 he produced and mixed the single “Let The Beat Knock” for EMI artist Cyssero which was ranked in the top 30 of Amazon.com. In 2008, Carter produced and mixed the single “I Wanna Know” for Christabelle which was a #1 hit radio single and landed her major music awards (Best Solo Artist – 2008 Bay Music Awards, Best R&B/Hip-Hop Artist – 2008 Coca-Cola Malta Music Awards.). In 2011, Carter mixed the #1 hit single "Animal" by rock band Mr. Rally. In 2012 Carter produced and mixed the follow-up hit single "Say" for Christabelle which was released to radio in May 2012, reached #1 June 18, 2012 in its fourth week on the charts and earned Christabelle the 2012 Bay Music Award for Best Solo Artist.

Some of the artists Carter has worked with include Backstreet Boys, J. Holiday, Jasmine Trias, Christabelle, Natalise, Kaila Yu, Stormy Strong, Dahrio Wonder, Cyssero, and Mr. Rally. He also has over 100 song placements in TV/film and has made music for Bunim-Murray Productions, MTV Productions, CW Network, Discover Card, Dodge and The Oprah Winfrey Show.
