= Toi c'est moi =

Single by Priscilla

from the album Une fille comme moi
- Released: April 13, 2004
- Genre: Pop
- Length: 3:47
- Label: Jive 82876 61189 2
- Songwriter(s): Bertrand Châtenet, Philippe Osman
- Producer(s): Bertrand Châtenet, Philippe Osman, Patrick Debort

Priscilla singles chronology
"Toujours pas d'amour" (2004)	"Toi c'est moi" (2004)	"Jalousie" (2004)

Music video
- "Toi c'est moi" on YouTube

"Toi c'est moi" is a song by French singer Priscilla from her third album Une fille comme moi. The song reached number 16 in France.

It was the second single from that album. The album came out in February 2004, and the single two months later, in April.

== Track listing ==
All tracks are written by Bertrand Châtenet and Philippe Osman

CD single (Jive 82876 61189 2)
No.	Title	Length
1.	"Toi c'est moi"	3:47
2.	"Juste pour savoir"	3:54

Extras: "Priscilla en studio" (Video)

== Charts ==
Chart (2004)	Peak position
Belgium (Ultratip Bubbling Under Wallonia)	17
France (SNEP)	16
