= Call Me, Beep Me! =

Theme song to the animated TV series "Kim Possible"

Song by Christina Milian

from the album Kim Possible
- Genre: R&B
- Label: Walt Disney
- Songwriters: Cory Lerios; George Gabriel

Audio
- "Call Me, Beep Me!" on YouTube

"Walking on Sunshine / Call Me, Beep Me"

Single by Preluders

from the album Kim Possible (German ver.)
- A-side: "Walking on Sunshine" "Call Me, Beep Me"
- Released: 2004
- Length: 3:35
- Label: Cheyenne 500 418-8
- Songwriters: Cory Lerios; George Gabriel

"Mission Kim Possible"

Single by Priscilla

from the album Kim Possible (French ver.)
- Released: June 30, 2006
- Length: 2:36
- Label: Walt Disney
- Songwriters: Cory Lerios; George Gabriel

Priscilla singles chronology
| "Je danse donc je suis" (2005) | "Mission Kim Possible" (2006) | "Chante!" (2007) |

"Call Me, Beep Me! (From "Kim Possible")"

Single by Sadie Stanley
- Released: January 11, 2019
- Genre: Dance-pop
- Length: 2:41
- Label: Walt Disney
- Songwriters: Cory Lerios; George Gabriel

Music video
- "Call Me, Beep Me!" on YouTube

"Call Me, Beep Me!", or "The Kim Possible Song", is the theme song for the Disney Channel animated series Kim Possible. The song was written by Cory Lerios and George Gabriel.

The original version of the song was recorded by Christina Milian. The song has been covered by Priscilla in 2006 in French, the Preluders in 2004, Banaroo in 2006, Beni in 2005 in Japanese, and by Kiki Ting in Mandarin.

In 2015, the original version of the song claimed the number one spot in the ranking of the "Disney Channel Theme Songs of Yesteryear".

The song is also used as the theme song for the 2019 live-action film adaptation. In addition to Millian's version returning and being used in the film's opening sequence, a new version was produced for the film, sung by its lead actress, Sadie Stanley.

== Track listings ==
=== Preluders version ===
CD maxi single "Walking on Sunshine" / "Call Me, Beep Me" (Cheyenne 500 418-8, 2004)

1. "Walking on Sunshine" (Radio Edit) – 3:35
2. "Call Me, Beep Me" (Radio Edit) – 2:36
3. "Walking on Sunshine" (Karaoke) – 3:35

Extras: "Call Me, Beep Me" (Video) – 2:36

=== Banaroo version ===
CD maxi single "Uh Mamma" (Na klar! 500 987 773-6, 24 February 2006)

1. "Uh Mamma" (Radio Edit) – 3:14
2. "Uh Mamma" (The Navigator RmxVers. 1.2) – 4:20
3. "Uh Mamma" (Retro Filter Mix) – 4:21
4. "Uh Mamma" (Instrumental) – 3:12
5. "Call Me, Beep Me!" – 3:02

=== Priscilla version ===
Digital download single (Walt Disney Records, 30 June 2006)

1. "Mission Kim Possible" – 2:36

=== Sadie Stanley version ===
Digital download single (Walt Disney Records, 11 January 2019)

1. "Call Me, Beep Me! (From "Kim Possible")" – 2:41
