= Never Gone (Andee song) =

Single by Andee

from the album Black and White Heart
- Released: May 19, 2014
- Recorded: 2013 in Montréal, Québec (Man of the Hour Studio)
- Genre: Pop rock; soul
- Length: 2:52
- Label: Universal Canada
- Songwriter(s): Andrée-Anne Leclerc; Sébastien Lefebvre
- Producer(s): Sébastien Lefebvre

Andee singles chronology
| "Never Gone" (2014) | "Sorries" (2014) |

Music video
- "Never Gone" on YouTube

"Never Gone" is a song written and recorded by Canadian singer-songwriter Andee for her debut studio album, Black and White Heart (2015). The song was co-written and produced by Sébastien Lefebvre, best known as the rhythm guitarist and backing vocalist for Canadian band Simple Plan. "Never Gone" was released May 19, 2014 as Andee's debut single and the lead single for the album. Upon release, the single was available in both English and French, as a tribute to the co-writers' French Canadian heritage.

"Never Gone" experienced commercial success in Canada, reaching number 40 on the Canadian Hot 100 in August 2014 and also peaking within the top 10 on the national adult contemporary airplay chart. The song's success at the format garnered Andee a nomination for Best New Group or Solo Artist at the 2015 Canadian Radio Music Awards.

== Background ==
Andee, then going by her birth name Andrée-Anne Leclerc, first gained exposure by competing on the fifth edition of Québecois reality singing competition Star Académie in 2012 where she placed in the top eight and drew the attention of Paul Jessop, the vice-president of promotions at Universal Music Canada. In early 2013, Andee encountered Sébastien Lefebvre, who would work with her over the next year as the executive producer of her debut album. In January 2014, Leclerc signed a record deal with Universal Music Canada and adopted the stage name Andee, an anglophone derivative of Andrée-Anne. "Never Gone" was released as the first single from the project in May 2014.

== Reception ==
=== Critical ===
Noah Siegel of New Canadian Music wrote that the song is "a forceful Adele-inspired single that's effective pop in both its' [sic] English and French versions." Andee was nominated for Best New Group or Solo Artist in the category of AC (adult contemporary radio) at the 2015 Canadian Radio Music Awards for the song.

=== Commercial ===
"Never Gone" debuted at number 94 on the Canadian Hot 100 chart dated June 28, 2014. It entered the top 50 in its sixth week, rising 53–43 on the chart dated August 2, 2014. The song reached its peak position of 40 on the chart dated August 23, 2014. "Never Gone" is Andee's only top fifty single to date and spent a total of 20 weeks on the chart. The song was also a multi-format radio hit, peaking at numbers 6, 25, and 15 on the Billboard Canada AC, CHR/Top 40, and Hot AC charts, respectively.

== Music video ==
An accompanying music video was directed by Alon Isocianu and premiered June 26, 2016. A French version was released the same day.

== Track listings ==
Digital download

1. "Never Gone" – 2:52

Digital download (French)

1. "Never Gone" (Version Française) – 2:50

== Credits and personnel ==
Credits adapted from liner notes.

Technical

- Recorded by Sébastien Lefebvre at Man of the Hour Studio / Fever Music Group in Montréal, Québec
- Mixed by Serban Ghenea at Mixstar Studio in Virginia Beach, Virginia
- Mastered by Ryan Morey at Ryan Morey Mastering in Outremont, Québec

Musicians

- Andee (Andrée-Anne Leclerc) – vocals
- Sébastien Lefebvre – guitar, bass, keyboards, programming
- Chantal Bergeron – violin
- Brian Bacon – violin alto
- Christine Giguère – cello
- Nathalie Bonin – violin

Additional personnel

- Strings recorded by Patrick Goyette at Planet Studio
  - Strings arranged by Sébastien Lefebvre and Jay Lefebvre

== Charts ==
=== Weekly charts ===
| Chart (2014) | Peak position |
|---|---|
| Canada (Canadian Hot 100) | 40 |
| Canada AC (Billboard) | 6 |
| Canada CHR/Top 40 (Billboard) | 25 |
| Canada Hot AC (Billboard) | 15 |

=== Year end charts ===
| Chart (2014) | Position |
|---|---|
| Canada AC (Billboard) | 30 |

== Release history ==
| Country | Date | Format | Version | Label | Ref. |
|---|---|---|---|---|---|
| Canada | May 19, 2014 | Digital download | Original | Universal Canada | |
| Canada | May 19, 2014 | Digital download | Version Française | Universal Canada | |
