= La vie sait (song) =

Single by Priscilla Betti

from the album La vie sait
- Released: January 27, 2017
- Genre: Pop
- Length: 3:19
- Label: Columbia Music France (Universal Music Group)
- Songwriter(s): Nazim Khaled, Mark Hekic
- Producer(s): Gary Fico, Julien Comblat

Priscilla Betti singles chronology
"Changer le monde" (2016)	"La vie sait" (2017)

Music video
- "La vie sait" on YouTube

"La vie sait" is a song by French singer Priscilla Betti. Released as a digital single on January 27, 2017, it reached number 109 in France.

The song is part of Priscilla Betti's sixth studio album, also titled La vie sait, that appeared later in the same year (on May 19, 2017).

== Track listing ==
Digital single (Capitol)
No.	Title	Writer(s)	Length
1.	"La vie sait"	Nazim Khaled, Mark Hekic	3:19

== Charts ==
Chart (2017)	Peak position
France (SNEP)	109
