= Changer le monde =

Single by Priscilla Betti

from the album La vie sait
- Released: December 9, 2016
- Genre: Pop
- Length: 3:06
- Label: Columbia Music France (Universal Music Group)
- Songwriter(s): Yaacov Salah, Slimane Nebchi, Meïr Salah
- Producer(s): Julien Comblat, Gary Fico

Priscilla Betti singles chronology
"Moi je danse" (2015)	"Changer le monde" (2016)	"La vie sait" (2017)

Music video
- "Changer le monde" on YouTube

"Changer le monde" is a song by French singer Priscilla Betti. Released as a digital single on December 9, 2016, it reached number 120 in France.

The song is part of Priscilla Betti's sixth studio album, titled La vie sait, that appeared six months later (on May 19, 2017).

== Track listing ==
Digital single (Capitol)
No.	Title	Writer(s)	Length
1.	"Changer le monde"	Yaacov Salah, Slimane Nebchi, Meïr Salah	3:06

== Charts ==
Chart (2016)	Peak position
France (SNEP)	120
