= Marlon Anderson (politician) =

American attorney and politician

Member of the Missouri House of Representatives from the 76th district
- Incumbent
- Assumed office January 6, 2021
- Preceded by: Chris Carter III

Personal details
- Born: St. Louis, Missouri, U.S.
- Party: Democratic
- Education: Clark Atlanta University (BA); Southern University (JD)

Marlon S. Anderson is an American attorney and politician serving as a member of the Missouri House of Representatives from the 76th district. Elected in November 2020, he assumed office on January 6, 2021.

== Early life and education ==
Anderson was born in North Pointe St. Louis, Missouri. After graduating from the Gateway Institute of Technology, he earned an associate degree from St. Louis Community College, a Bachelor of Arts degree in mass media from Clark Atlanta University, and a Juris Doctor from the Southern University Law Center.

== Career ==
Prior to entering politics, Anderson worked for the Louisiana Public Defender Juvenile Litigations Division and the St. Louis City Circuit Attorney's Office. He later founded his own law firm. Anderson was elected to the Missouri House of Representatives in November 2020 and assumed office on January 6, 2021. Anderson is the ranking minority member of the Joint Committee on the Justice System.

== Electoral history ==
2020 Missouri's 76th House District election
Primary election
Party	Candidate	Votes	%
Democratic	Marlon Anderson	3,452	50.3
Democratic	Chris Carter (incumbent)	3,410	49.7
General election
Democratic	Marlon Anderson	11,236	100.0

Missouri House of Representatives Election, November 8, 2022, District 76
Party	Candidate	Votes	%	±%
Democratic	Marlon Anderson	8,049	100.00%	0.00
