= Quand je serai jeune =

Single by Priscilla

from the album Cette vie nouvelle
- B-side: "Fou d'elle"
- Released: September 25, 2001
- Genre: Pop
- Length: 3:57
- Label: Jive 79252609
- Songwriter(s): Philippe Osman, Shetan
- Producer(s): Philippe Osman, Patrick Debort

Priscilla singles chronology
"Quand je serai jeune" (2001)	"Cette vie nouvelle" (2002)

"Quand je serai jeune" is the debut single by French singer Priscilla. She released it in September 2001, at the age of 12. Both songs the single contained would later appear on her debut album, Cette vie nouvelle, which would be out in June of the next year.

== Track listing ==
All tracks are written by Philippe Osman and Shetan

CD single (Jive 79252609)
No.	Title	Length
1.	"Quand je serai jeune"	3:57
2.	"Fou d'elle"	4:03

== Charts ==
Chart (2001)	Peak position
Belgium (Ultratop 50 Wallonia)	23
France (SNEP)	10

== Certifications ==
Region	Certification	Certified units/sales
France (SNEP)	Gold	250,000^{*}
^{*} Sales figures based on certification alone.
