= Je danse donc je suis =

Single by Priscilla

from the album Bric à brac
- Released: October 17, 2005
- Genre: Pop
- Length: 3:36
- Label: Jive 82876 74084 2
- Songwriter(s): Bertrand Châtenet, Philippe Osman
- Producer(s): Patrick Debort

Priscilla singles chronology
"Bric à brac" (2005)	"Je danse donc je suis" (2005)	"Mission Kim Possible" (2006)

"Je danse donc je suis" is a song by French singer Priscilla from her fourth album Bric à brac. It was the album's second track and it was released as its second single. The single came out three months and a half after the album, on October 17, 2005, and debuted at number 45 in France.

== Track listing ==
All tracks are written by Bertrand Châtenet and Philippe Osman

CD single (Jive 82876 74084 2)
No.	Title	Length
1.	"Je danse donc je suis"	3:36
2.	"Tout est à refaire"	3:47

== Charts ==
Chart (2005)	Peak position
France (SNEP)	45
