= Cette vie nouvelle =

Cette Vie nouvelle

Studio album by Priscilla Betti
- Released: 4 June 2002
- Recorded: France
- Genre: Pop
- Label: Virgin Music

Priscilla Betti chronology
Cette Vie nouvelle (2002)	Priscilla (2002)

Singles from Cette Vie nouvelle
- 1. "Quand je serai jeune" Released: 25 September 2001; 2. "Cette Vie nouvelle" Released: 19 March 2002; 3. "Bla bla bla" Released: 4 June 2002

Cette vie nouvelle is the name of the debut album of the French singer Priscilla Betti. Released in June 2002, it was preceded by the two singles "Quand je serai jeune" and "Cette Vie nouvelle" (a cover version of the famous hit "What a Feeling", from the soundtrack of Flashdance), which were both top-ten hits in France. Another song from the album was released as a third single, "Bla bla bla".

The songs were composed by various artists, including Philippe Swan (he wrote "Votre Fille"), who charted in France in 1989 with his song "Dans ma rue" (#36). Philippe Osman and Bertrand Châtenet, who had wholly composed the following albums of Priscilla, also participated in this album: Osman composed six songs, made the arrangements and played the keyboards and the guitar, while Châtenet mixed them.

On the French Albums Chart, the album peaked at #18 in its fifth week on July 6, 2002, and remained on the chart for 18 weeks. It was certified Silver disc by the SNEP, the French certifier.

== Track listing ==
1. "Bla bla bla" — 2:35
2. "Cette Vie nouvelle" — 3:48
3. "Plus" — 3:19
4. "Qui que tu sois" — 3:58
5. "Tout arrive" — 4:07
6. "C'est vrai" — 4:16
7. "Quand je serai jeune" — 4:09
8. "Belles autrement" — 3:47
9. "Fou d'elle" — 4:04
10. "Votre fille" — 2:50

+ Extras :

1. "Cette Vie nouvelle" (music video)
2. "Cette Vie nouvelle" (karaoke)
3. Gallery of photos
4. Awake screen
5. Biography

== Certifications ==
Region	Certification	Certified units/sales
France (SNEP)	Gold	100,000^{*}
^{*} Sales figures based on certification alone.

== Charts ==
Chart (2002)	Peak position
Belgian (Wallonia) Albums Chart	44
French Albums Chart	18
Swiss Albums Chart	53
