= Heaven in Our Headlights =

Single by Hedley

from the album Wild Life
- Released: June 17, 2014
- Genre: Pop
- Length: 3:09
- Label: Universal Music Canada
- Songwriters: Jacob Hoggard; Brian Howes; Nolan Sipe
- Producers: Hoggard; Sipe

Hedley singles chronology
"Crazy for You" (2014)	"Heaven in Our Headlights" (2014)	"Pocket Full of Dreams" (2014)

Music video
- "Heaven in Our Headlights" on YouTube

"Heaven in Our Headlights" is a song by Canadian pop rock band Hedley. It released from their fifth studio album, Wild Life. The song was issued to radio as the third official single from the album on June 17, 2014, while the music video premiered on June 19. The song sold 82,000 digital copies in Canada as of December 2014.

== Background and composition ==
Following the release of Wild Life's second single "Crazy for You", lead singer Jacob Hoggard said the group planned on releasing "Heaven in Our Headlights" as the next single. On June 17, 2014, the song was serviced for radio airplay.

The song was written by Jacob Hoggard, Brian Howes and Nolan Sipe. It was produced by Hoggard and Sipe. The track runs at 120 BPM and is in the key of C major. Hoggard described the song as a "road trip song."

== Music video ==
The music video for "Heaven in Our Headlights" premiered via MuchMusic on June 19, 2014. It was directed by Matt Leaf and Jacob Hoggard. The video is set mostly in a desert following a couple (Hoggard and a woman) on a road trip as well as scenes from their tour, Wild Live.

== Awards and nominations ==
Awards and nominations for "Heaven in Our Headlights"
Year	Organization	Award	Result	Ref(s)
2015	MuchMusic Video Awards	Pop Video of the Year	Nominated	
2015	MuchMusic Video Awards	Fan Fave Video of the Year	Nominated	
2015	SOCAN Awards	Pop/Rock Music Award	Won	

== Personnel ==
Credits for "Heaven in Our Headlights" adapted from album's liner notes.

Hedley

- Jacob Hoggard – vocals, acoustic guitar, keyboard, piano, banjo, Moog synthesizer
- Dave Rosin – guitar, background vocals
- Tommy Mac – bass, background vocals
- Chris Crippin – drums, background vocals

Additional musicians

- Nolan Sipe – guitar

Production

- Jacob Hoggard – producer, programming
- Nolan Sipe – producer, engineer
- Ben Kaplan – recording engineer
- Christopher Midgley – assistant recording engineer
- Jason "JVP" Van Poederooyen – mixing
- Ryan Peterson – editing

== Charts ==
=== Weekly charts ===
Weekly chart performance for "Heaven in Our Headlights"
Chart (2014–15)	Peak position
Canada (Canadian Hot 100)	14
Canada AC (Billboard)	5
Canada CHR/Top 40 (Billboard)	8
Canada Hot AC (Billboard)	4

=== Year-end charts ===
Year-end chart performance for "Heaven in Our Headlights"
Chart (2014)	Position
Canada (Canadian Hot 100)	52

== Release history ==
Release dates and formats for "Heaven in Our Headlights"
Region	Date	Format	Label	Ref.
Canada	June 17, 2014	Contemporary hit radio	Universal Music Canada	
