= Une fille comme moi =

Studio album by Priscilla Betti
- Released: 2 February 2004
- Recorded: France
- Genre: Pop
- Label: BMG

Priscilla Betti chronology
Priscilla (2002)	Une fille comme moi (2004)	Bric à brac (2005)

Singles from Une fille comme moi
- 1. "Toujours pas d'amour" Released: February 2004; 2. "Toi c'est moi" Released: April 2004; 3. "Jalousie" Released: September 2004

Une fille comme moi is the third album by French singer Priscilla Betti. It was released on February 2, 2004, and was supported by the French top five hit "Toujours pas d'amour", followed by the singles "Toi c'est moi" and "Jalousie" which achieved a moderate success in comparison. Une fille comme moi is Priscilla's most successful album, reaching the top ten in France.

All songs are composed by Philippe Osman (music, arrangements) and Bertrand Châtenet (lyrics, mixing).

According to the Swiss Charts website, the talent of the singer is confirmed throughout this album. The style is varied with pop songs such as "Toi c'est moi" or "Jalousie". The singer's voice and sense of rhythm are underlined on "Juste pour savoir" or "Quand le ciel..."

== Track listing ==
1. "Toujours pas d'amour" — 3:33
2. "Toi c'est moi" — 3:47
3. "Banquise" — 3:54
4. "Juste pour savoir" — 3:54
5. "Une fille comme moi" — 4:05
6. "Loin de ma famille" — 3:31
7. "Où est le problème" — 3:46
8. "Jalousie" - 3:39
9. "Quand le ciel..." — 3:59
10. "Un jour sur deux" — 3:37
11. "Toujours pas d'amour" (remix) — 3:26

== Personnel ==
- Lyrics by Bertrand Châtenet
- Music by Philippe Osman
- Arrangement, programmation and all instruments by Philippe Osman
- Mixing by Bertrand Châtenet
- Vocals by Priscilla
- Remixed version by Ghost
- Produced by B.Châtenet, P.Osman and P.Debort
- Produced by Patrick Debort and Denys Limon for Cap Mistral Corporation
- Edited by Mache Prod
- Recorded at Guillaume Tell and Mega studios in Suresnes

== Charts ==
=== Peak positions ===
Chart (2004)	Peak position
Belgian (Wallonia) Albums Chart	38
French SNEP Albums Chart	8
Swiss Albums Chart	83

=== Year-end charts ===
Chart (2004)	Position
French Albums Chart	75

== Certifications ==
Region	Certification	Certified units/sales
France (SNEP)	Gold	100,000^{*}
^{*} Sales figures based on certification alone.
