= Priscilla (album) =

Studio album by Priscilla Betti
- Released: December 2002
- Recorded: France
- Genre: Pop
- Label: Virgin Music

Priscilla Betti chronology
Cette vie nouvelle (2002)	Priscilla (2002)	Une fille comme moi (2004)

Singles from Priscilla
- 1. "Regarde-moi (teste-moi, déteste-moi)" Released: 9 December 2002; 2. "Tchouk tchouk musik" Released: 15 April 2003

Priscilla is the second studio album by French singer Priscilla Betti. It was released in December 2002 and was supported by the two hit singles "Regarde-moi (teste-moi, déteste-moi)" and "Tchouk tchouk musik" which both reached the top ten in France.

On the French Albums Chart, although the album was unable to enter the top ten, it was charted for 45 weeks. It eventually achieved Gold status.

== Track listing ==
All lyrics are written by Bertrand Châtenet; all music is composed by Philippe Osman

No.	Title	Length
1.	"Celle qui bat des ailes"	3:48
2.	"Coccinelle"	3:28
3.	"Tchouk tchouk musik"	3:24
4.	"Petit navire"	4:28
5.	"Regarde-moi (teste-moi, déteste-moi)"	3:27
6.	"À quelle heure?"	4:15
7.	"Prissou"	4:15
8.	"Isadora"	4:21
9.	"Non-Stop"	3:56
10.	"Lettre"	4:05
11.	"Message pour répondeur téléphonique (Fille)"	0:22
12.	"Message pour répondeur téléphonique (Garçon)"	0:22
Total length:		40:16

== Personnel ==
- Lyrics by Bertrand Châtenet
- Music by Philippe Osman
- Arrangement, programmation and all instruments by Philippe Osman
- Mixing by Bertrand Châtenet (all tracks), Jérôme Devoise (tracks 3,5) and V.Chevalot (track 10)
- Mastered by André Perriat at Top Master studio
- Vocals by Priscilla (all tracks), Annie Calvert (tracks 1,2,6,7,9), Philippe Osman (tracks 3,7-10)
- Produced by B.Châtenet, P.Osman and P.Debort
- Edited by Mache Prod
- Photo by Emmanuel Scorcelletti / GAMMA
- Graphic design by Barejo

== Charts ==
Chart (2003)	Peak position
Belgian (Wallonia) Albums Chart	40
French Albums Chart	16
Swiss Albums Chart	72

== Certifications ==
Region	Certification	Certified units/sales
France (SNEP)	Gold	100,000^{*}
^{*} Sales figures based on certification alone.
