= Kim Possible (soundtrack) =

Soundtrack album by Various artists
- Released: July 1, 2003
- Genre: Pop; dance-pop; pop rock; R&B
- Label: Walt Disney

The Kim Possible soundtrack is an album released on July 1, 2003 by Walt Disney Records. It contains songs from the Disney Channel series Kim Possible as well as additional songs by contemporary artists. The voice actors for the characters Kim Possible (Christy Carlson Romano), Ron Stoppable (Will Friedle), and Rufus (Nancy Cartwright) are also featured on the soundtrack.

== Background ==
The album was released with numerous alternate track listings worldwide. On March 22, 2005, Walt Disney Records released a new edition of the soundtrack dubbed the "Kim-Proved" edition. This version omits the songs "This Year" by A*Teens and "Work It Out" by Brassy and adds "Could it Be" by Christy Carlson Romano, "Rappin' Drakken" by Dr. Drakken, and "Call Me, Beep Me! (Movie Mix)" by Angela Michael.

In 2020, album was reissued digitally with yet another alternative track listing.

== Track listings ==
=== Original version - 2003 ===
1. "CALL ME, BEEP ME! (The Kim Possible Song)" - Christina Milian
2. "It's Just You" - LMNT
3. "I'm Ready" - Angela Michael
4. "Get Up on Ya Feet" - Aaron Carter
5. "Celebration" - Jump5
6. "Say The Word" - Kim Possible (Christy Carlson Romano)
7. "Summertime Guys" - Nikki Cleary
8. "This Year" - A*Teens
9. "Work it Out" - Brassy
10. "E! Is for Everybody" - Cooler Kids
11. "Come On, Come On" - Smash Mouth
12. "The Naked Mole Rap" - Ron Stoppable (Will Friedle) and Rufus (Nancy Cartwright)
13. "CALL ME, BEEP ME! (The Kim Possible Song)" (Tony Phillips Remix) - Christina Milian

=== Kim-Proved version - 2005 ===
1. "CALL ME, BEEP ME! (The Kim Possible Song)" - Christina Milian
2. "It's Just You" - LMNT
3. "I'm Ready" - Angela Michael
4. "Get Up on Ya Feet" - Aaron Carter
5. "Say The Word" - Kim Possible (Christy Carlson Romano)
6. "Celebration" - Jump5
7. "Could It Be" - Christy Carlson Romano
8. "Summertime Guys" - Nikki Cleary
9. "E! Is for Everybody" - Cooler Kids
10. "The Naked Mole Rap" - Ron Stoppable (Will Friedle) and Rufus (Nancy Cartwright)
11. "Come On, Come On" - Smash Mouth
12. "Rappin' Drakken" - Dr. Drakken (John DiMaggio)
13. "CALL ME, BEEP ME! (The Kim Possible Song)" (Tony Phillips Remix) - Christina Milian
14. "CALL ME, BEEP ME! (Movie Mix)" - Angela Michael

=== Italian version - 2006 ===
1. "CALL ME, BEEP ME! (The Kim Possible Song)" - Christina Milian
2. "Wake Up" - Hilary Duff
3. "Superstar" - Jamelia
4. "It's Just You" - LMNT
5. "Get Up on Ya Feet" - Aaron Carter
6. "Io ci sarò" - Kim Possible (Valentina Mari)
7. "Celebration" - Jump5
8. "Un amore nascosto" - Kim Possible (Valentina Mari)
9. "Summertime Guys" - Nikki Cleary
10. "E! Is for Everybody" - Cooler Kids
11. "La talpa senza pelo" - Ron Stoppable (Marco Vivio) e Rufus (Tatiana Dessi)
12. "Get Your Shine On" - Jesse McCartney
13. "Lavati la testa" - Dott. Drakken (Ambrogio Colombo)
14. "CALL ME, BEEP ME! (The Kim Possible Song)" (Tony Phillips Remix) - Christina Milian

=== German version - 2006 ===
1. "CALL ME, BEEP ME! (The Kim Possible Song)" - Banaroo
2. "Wake Up" - Hilary Duff
3. "Superstar" - Jamelia
4. "It's Just You" - LMNT
5. "Get Up on Ya Feet" - Aaron Carter
6. "Sag Nur Ein Wort" - Marius Claren/Saskia Tanfal
7. "Celebration" - Jump5
8. "Kann Das Sein" - Saskia Tanfal
9. "Summertime Guys" - Nikki Cleary
10. "E Is for Everybody" - Cooler Kids
11. "Nacktmull-Rap" - Marius Claren/Ron Stoppable/Stefan Krause/Rufus
12. "Come On Come On" - Smash Mouth
13. "Get Your Shine on" - Jesse McCartney
14. "Schäumen, Spülen Und Parier'n" - Dr Drakken/Jan Spitzer
15. "CALL ME, BEEP ME! (The Kim Possible Song)" (Tony Phillips Remix) - Christina Milian

=== French version - 2006 ===
1. "Mission Kim Possible" - Priscilla Betti
2. "Wake Up" - Hilary Duff
3. "Ma Vie" (French version) - Amine
4. "Superstar" - Jamelia
5. "It's Just You" - LMNT
6. "Get Up on Ya Feet" - Aaron Carter
7. "Suffit d'un Mot" - Mery
8. "Celebration" - Jump5
9. "Dis Pourquoi" - Veronica Antico
10. "Summertime Guys" - Nikki Cleary
11. "E Is for Everybody" - Cooler Kids
12. "Le Rap Du Taupinet Tondu" - Donald Reignoux as Robin Trépide (Ron Stoppable) & Michel Costa as Rufus
13. "Come On Come On" - Smash Mouth
14. "Get Your Shine on" - Jesse McCartney
15. "Mousse, Rince, Obéi" - Michel Elias as Dr. Drakken
16. "CALL ME, BEEP ME! (The Kim Possible Song)" - Christina Milian
17. "Code S-pion : La mission" - Fabienne Darnaud & Joan Faggianelli

=== Songs from Kim Possible - 2020 ===
1. "CALL ME, BEEP ME! (The Kim Possible Song)" - Christina Milian
2. "It's Just You" - LMNT
3. "I'm Ready" - Angela Michael
4. "Get Up on Ya Feet" - Aaron Carter
5. "Say The Word" - Kim Possible (Christy Carlson Romano)
6. "Summertime Guys" - Nikki Cleary
7. "This Year" - A*Teens
8. "E Is for Everybody" - Cooler Kids
9. "Come On, Come On" - Smash Mouth
10. "The Naked Mole Rap" - Ron Stoppable (Will Friedle) and Rufus (Nancy Cartwright)
11. "CALL ME, BEEP ME! (The Kim Possible Song)" (Tony Phillips Remix) - Christina Milian
12. "Could It Be" - Christy Carlson Romano
13. "CALL ME, BEEP ME! (Movie Mix)" - Angela Michael
14. "Rappin' Drakken" - Dr. Drakken (John DiMaggio)

== Charts ==
Year	Chart	Position
2003	The Billboard 200	125
