= Bric à brac (song) =

Single by Priscilla

from the album Bric à brac
- Released: June 27, 2005
- Genre: Pop
- Length: 4:12
- Label: Jive 82876 68874 2
- Songwriter(s): Bertrand Châtenet, Philippe Osman
- Producer(s): Patrick Debort

Priscilla singles chronology
"Jalousie" (2004)	"Bric à brac" (2005)	"Je danse donc je suis" (2005)

Music video
- "Bric à brac" on YouTube

"Bric à brac" is a song by French singer Priscilla from her fourth album Bric à brac. It was the album's opening track and it was released as its first single. The single came out simultaneously with the album on June 27, 2005, and reached number 31 in France.

== Track listing ==
All tracks are written by Bertrand Châtenet and Philippe Osman

CD single (Jive 82876 68874 2)
No.	Title	Length
1.	"Bric à brac"	4:12
2.	"Bric à brac" (Remix)	5:54

== Charts ==
Chart (2005)	Peak position
Belgium (Ultratip Bubbling Under Wallonia)	2
France (SNEP)	31
