= Joshua Peters =

American politician

- Peters in 2017

Member of the Missouri House of Representatives from the 76th district
- In office 2013–2019
- Preceded by: Chris Carter Jr.
- Succeeded by: Chris Carter

Personal details
- Born: August 25, 1987 (age 39) St. Louis, Missouri, U.S.
- Party: Democratic
- Education: Lincoln University (BS); Lindenwood University (MPA); University of Maryland (MGH)
- Occupation: Politician

Joshua D. Peters (born August 25, 1987) is a social and community impact practitioner and American civic leader. His work encompasses strategic initiatives within the Social and Community Impact function at Nike, Inc., focused on advancing community investment across Americas central region.

== Public service and political career ==
Peters held key legislative and operational positions within the office of a member of the United States Congress. He was later appointed by President Barack Obama as a Confidential Assistant to the Under Secretary of Education, Martha Kanter, where he contributed to the design of and rollout of the 'Financial Aid Shopping Sheet' a standardized tool enabling prospective studded to evaluate and compare financial aid packages with greater transparency.

Peters served in the Missouri House of Representatives, representing Missouri's 76th district from 2013 to 2019.

After learning about 18 fatal crashes, including 13 involving pedestrians, on Natural Bridge Avenue in the city of St. Louis. Peters successfully secured 7 million dollars to launch the Missouri Department of Transportation, Natural Bridge Safety Initiative. Peters and MoDOT partnered with St. Louis Metropolitan Police Dept. and six St. Louis Aldermen to designate a 4-mile segment of Natural Bridge between Goodfellow and Parnell, a Travel Safe Zone.

In 2016, Peters secured state funding for Lincoln University's 1890 Land-grant, which had not been appropriated by the state legislature since 1866. Peters stated, "Lincoln University is our state's most diverse institution and performs agricultural research that is vital to rural Missouri," Peters said. "It is well past time for Lincoln to be treated fairly and receive its full land-grant appropriation."

On April 24, 2017, Peters, filed a housing discrimination complaint to the United States Department of Housing and Urban Development. The case alleged that a concentration of facilities serving homeless people created a strong disparity within St. Louis City's Near Northside.

In addition to his official duties, Peters remained active within his party on April 5, 2017, he was appointed as the first congressional designee to the executive board of the Missouri Democratic Party.

== Corporate and social impact career ==
Following his legislative service, Peters transitioned into work focused on corporate social responsibility and community engagement initiatives.

== House committees ==
As a member of the Missouri House, Peters served on the following committees:

- International Trade
- Government Efficiency, Ranking Minority Member
- Budget
- Professional Registration and Licensing
- Agriculture Policy
- Appropriations-Public Safety and Correction
- Special Committee on Urban Issues
- Subcommittee on Appropriations - Agriculture, Conservation, Natural Resources, and Economic Development
- Subcommittee on Scope of Practice

== Affiliations ==
Peters is a member of Kappa Alpha Psi fraternity and served as a member of the board of Trustees of the Missouri Arts Council Trust, He holds the rank of Major of Civil Air Patrol U.S. Air Force Auxiliary. Peters retired from public office after being involved in a car accident, which left him incapacitated for three months of the legislative session.

Peters is a Catholic by faith.

== Elections ==
Missouri 76th District State Representative Special Election 2013
Party	Candidate	Votes	%	±%
Democratic	Joshua Peters	1,744	98.53%	Winner'"`UNIQ−−ref−00000051−QINU`"'

Missouri 76th District State Representative Special Election 2014
Party	Candidate	Votes	%	±%
Democratic	Joshua Peters	7,006	99.3%	Winner'"`UNIQ−−ref−0000005A−QINU`"'

== Political offices ==
Political offices
Preceded by Chris Carter Jr.	Member of Missouri House of Representatives from 76th District; 2013–present	Succeeded by incumbent
