= Jena Rose =

Musical artist (born 2001)

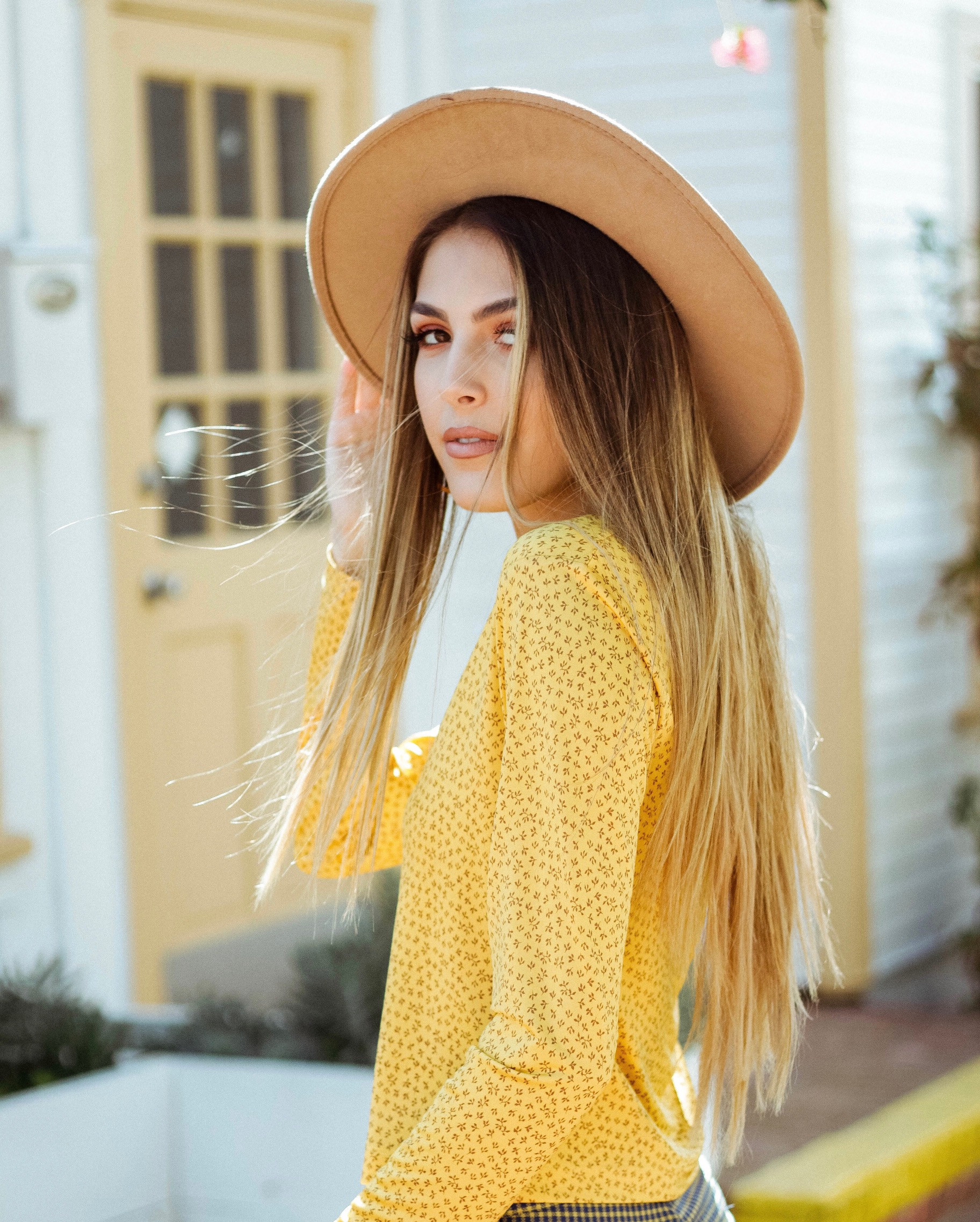
- Rose in 2017

Background information
- Born: Jena Rose Raphael; 2001 (age 24–25); Plano, Texas, U.S.
- Occupation: Singer-songwriter
- Instrument: Vocals
- Years active: 2015–present
- Website: jenarosemusic.com

Jena Rose Raphael (born 2001), known professionally as Jena Rose, is an American pop singer-songwriter from Plano, Texas. She has had three songs enter the Billboard Dance Club Songs chart, and released her debut EP, Reasons, on March 30, 2018.

In September 2023, she changed careers to go into real estate with joining former actress Cindy Ambuehl‘s organization.

== Early life ==
Rose was enrolled in piano lessons at age five. She started taking singing lessons and writing songs at age 9.

== Career ==
Rose had her first single in 2015, when Rose was 14, with her song "Take a Breath"on February 5, 2015. Her single "Sweet Love" was released on November 2, 2017. "Sweet Love" was remixed by a number of DJs, and these remixes were commercially released as an EP titled Sweet Love – The Remixes on November 22, 2017. The remixes spent 11 weeks on Billboard's Dance Club Songs chart, rising to no. 18. Rose has recorded songs with other artists, including "Crazy" featuring Sean Kingston and an acoustic version of "Sweet Love" with Tanner Patrick.

She released her debut EP, Reasons, on March 30, 2018. Rose wrote all of its songs and it was produced by Drew Scott. The lead single "Reasons" premiered on Billboard. Remixes of this single were commercially released as an EP titled Reasons – The Remixes the following month on April 17, 2018. The remixes of "Reasons" were added to the Billboard Dance Club Chart in their debut week, and the song went on to reach no. 14 on the chart and spent 12 weeks on the charts. The single "Lost at Sea" dedicated to her grandmother released on June 29, 2017 and remixes were released on September 28, 2018, as an EP titled Lost At Sea – The Remixes They spent 11 weeks on the chart and reached no. 18 on the charts on November 24, 2018. Later peaking at number 16.

She released another single on June 26, 2020, with Latin singer Casper Magico called “Forever Yours”. Its music video was released on July 30, 2020. On June 11, 2021, she released “Checkmate”, a Queen’s Gambit inspired track, which peaked at #38 on Mediabase Top 40 Chart while the music video spent seven weeks on MTV’s Top 10 Countdown. On July 29, 2022 she released “Being Good Is Boring”.

== Discography ==
=== Singles ===
Year	Title	Album
2015	"Take a Breath"	Non-album singles
2016	"Paper Walls"	Non-album singles
2016	"Turn the Page"	Non-album singles
2017	"Lost at Sea"	Non-album singles
2017	"Loved"	Non-album singles
2017	"Sweet Love"	Non-album singles
2018	"Reasons"	Reasons EP
2020	“Forever Yours”	N/A
2021	“Checkmate”	N/A
2022	“Being Good Is Boring”	N/A
