= Andee =

Canadian singer-songwriter (born 1990)

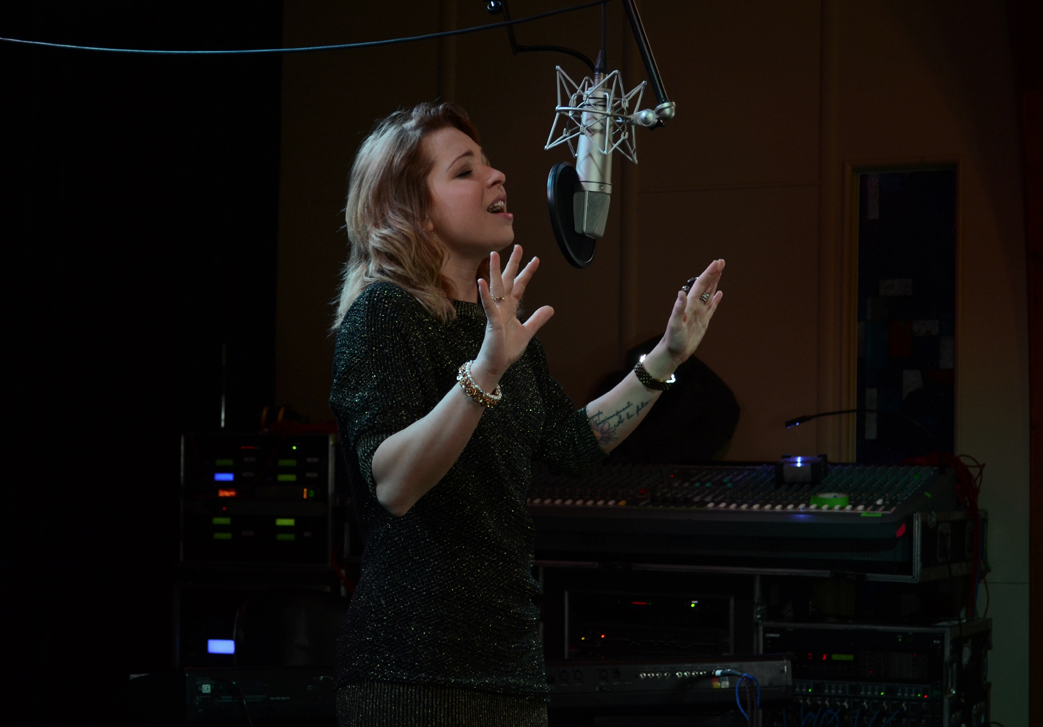
- Andee performing at The Chapel in February 2014

Background information
- Born: Andrée-Anne Leclerc; November 1, 1990 (age 35); Saint-Jean-Chrysostome, Quebec, Canada
- Genres: Pop rock, French pop
- Occupation: Singer-songwriter
- Years active: 2009–present
- Label: Coalition Music Records Universal Music Canada
- Website: www.andeeofficial.com

Andee (born Andrée-Anne Leclerc on November 1, 1990) is a Canadian singer-songwriter from Saint-Jean-Chrysostome, Quebec. She rose to fame as a finalist on the Quebecois singing competition Star Académie before pursuing a solo career in English and signing with Universal Music Canada in 2014. Her debut single, "Never Gone", was released May 19, 2014 and entered the Canadian Hot 100 at No. 94. Her debut studio album, Black and White Heart was released on May 26, 2015. Andee's latest EP, One, Plus One Equals Us, was released on March 26, 2021, under independent label Coalition Music Records.

== Biography ==
=== 1990–2012: Career beginnings and Star Académie ===
Andee started singing in church choirs, and her interest in music evolved into taking singing and guitar lessons, teaching herself piano, and writing her own original music by the age of 11. Andrée-Anne attended Cégep de Drummondville, where she studied pop and jazz vocal studies. At the age of 19, Andrée-Anne toured Thailand and Malaysia with the all-girl pop cover band, Akasha. Soon after returning from her tour in Asia, Andee signed up for the fifth season of the televised Quebec singing competition, Star Académie, where she was one of the top four female finalists. This opportunity led her to working with Sébastien Lefebvre, from the Canadian pop rock band, Simple Plan, and singing on the bilingual versions of the songs "Kiss You Inside Out" by Hedley and "Dum Da Dum" by Shawn Desman, in 2012.

=== 2013–present ===
In January 2014, Andee signed a deal with Universal Music Canada for her first album, as well as a management contract with Coalition Music. Andee continued to gain more mainstream success, with her song "We Are Gold" being used as a musical feature during the CBC's coverage of the 2014 Sochi Winter Olympics. Her first single, "Never Gone", was released on May 19, 2014, and the official French and English music videos followed on VEVO on June 26, 2014. "Never Gone" peaked at the number 40 spot on Billboard's Canadian Hot 100 Chart. Andee's second single, "Sorries", co-written by Pink, was released on October 21, 2014.

In July 2014, Andee shared the stage with Simple Plan at Brampton's Canada Day celebrations, and later performed at Quebec's Festival D'ete. In the fall of 2014, Andee supported Demi Lovato on the Canadian leg of the Demi World Tour. Andee joined CHUM-FM's Breakfast in Barbados 2015 alongside pop rock band OneRepublic in April 2015, and performed alongside Simple Plan for the FIFA Women's World Cup Trophy Tour on April 30, 2015, at Much in Toronto. Andee also performed with Jessie J at Metropolis in Montreal on May 6, 2015 and Cody Simpson at the Canadian National Exhibition September 1, 2015.

Andee released her debut album, Black and White Heart, on May 26, 2015. She also received a nomination for best new group or solo artist in the AC category for the 2015 Canadian Radio Music Awards for her song "Never Gone". In 2016 Black and White Heart was long listed for the 2016 Prism Prize. During 2015–2016 Andee was the opening act for Marianas Trench during their Quebec stops for their " Hey You Guys" tour.

With One, Andee returned with a fresh approach to her sound after overcoming a dark period in her life. She shared her journey with bipolar disorder and psychosis in the book "Mes tempêtes intérieures" by Vanessa Beaulieu that was released in 2018. This led her in new sonic directions with the help of producers Emery Taylor and Herag Sanbalian, although the focus remained on catchy melodies, sick beats and emotionally charged lyrics.

In March 2021, Andee and the cast of Star Académie, reunited for a 10-year anniversary.

Whether she is on stage or in the studio, Andee's goal is always to connect with listeners as intimately as she can. Plus One, is the second of two EPs that will make up Andee's full album under Coalition Music Records. One, Plus One Equal Us, released on March 26, 2021, comprising both EP's: One and Plus One.

In February 2024, she launched a new single with the Frères Grand entitled "Quel Dégât".

== Discography ==
=== Albums ===
Title	Details	Peak positions
Title	Details	CAN
Black and White Heart	Release date: May 26, 2015; Label: Universal Music Canada	16

=== Extended plays ===
Title	Details
One	Release date: November 15, 2019; Label: Coalition Music
Plus One	Release date: June 12, 2020; Label: Coalition Music
One, Plus One Equals Us	Release date: March 26, 2021; Label: Coalition Music

=== Singles ===
Year	Single	Peak chart positions				Album
Year	Single	CAN	CAN AC	CAN CHR	CAN Hot AC	Album
2014	"Never Gone"	40	6	25	15	Black and White Heart
2014	"Sorries"	53	7	22	12	Black and White Heart
2015	"Black and White Heart"	—	30	—	—	Black and White Heart
2015	"Tu Enflammes Mon Corps"	—	—	—	—	Black and White Heart
2017	"Les jours"	—	—	—	—	Non-album single
2019	"Cruel"	—	—	—	—	One
2020	"Case Départ"	—	—	—	—	Plus One
"—" denotes a recording that did not chart or was not released to that format.

==== Promotional singles ====
Year	Single	Album
2014	"We Are Gold"	Non-album single

=== Other charted songs ===
Year	Single	Peak chart positions	Album
Year	Single	CAN AC	Album
2014	"Christmas (Baby Please Come Home)"	3	Non-album single
"—" denotes a recording that did not chart or was not released to that format.

=== Guest appearances ===
Year	Single	Main artist	Note(s)
2012	"Kiss You Inside Out"	Hedley	Featured artist on the "Version Française" of the single; Credited as Andrée-Anne Leclerc
2013	"Dum da Dum"	Shawn Desman	Featured artist on the "Version Française" of the single; Credited as Andrée-Anne Leclerc

=== Music videos ===
Year	Video	Director
2014	"Never Gone"	Alon Isocianu
2014	"Sorries"	Cazhhmere Mike, Mike McLaughlin
2015	"Black and White Heart"	The Pesky Bastards
2020	"Cruel"	Brendan Barnard & Ryan Cowan from Secodo Productions
