= Sébastien Lefebvre =

Canadian musician (born 1981)

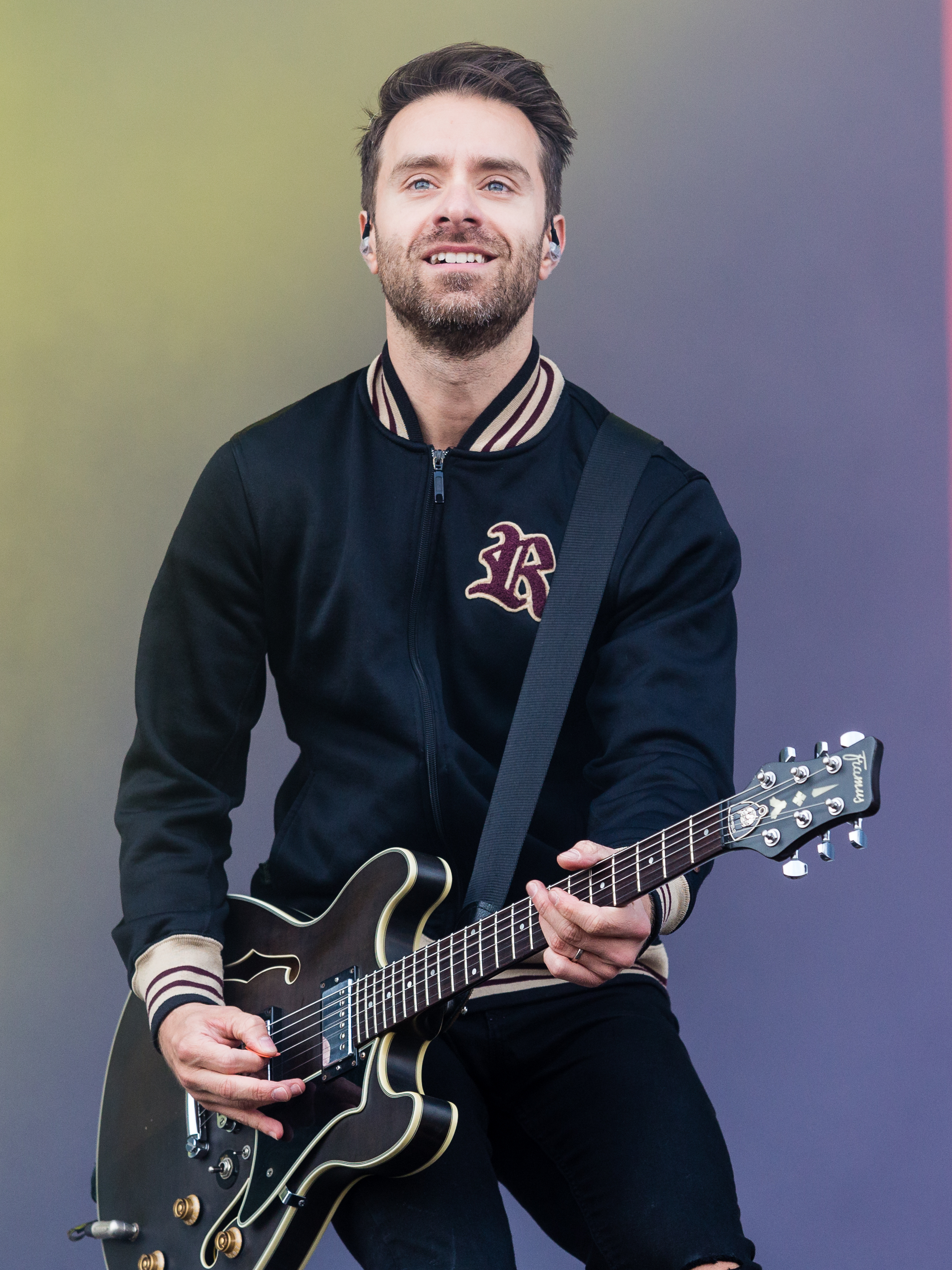
- Lefebvre performing with Simple Plan in 2017

Background information
- Also known as: Seb, Sebby
- Born: June 5, 1981 (age 44); Montreal, Quebec, Canada
- Genres: Pop-punk; alternative rock; pop rock; emo; punk rock; power pop
- Occupations: Musician; actor
- Instruments: Guitar; vocals; bass
- Years active: 1999–present
- Labels: Lava; Atlantic; Coalition
- Member of: Simple Plan
- Website: sebastienlefebvre.ca

Sébastien Lefebvre MSC (born June 5, 1981) is a Canadian musician, who is best known as the rhythm guitarist and backing vocalist for the rock band Simple Plan. He has also released solo albums and duo work.

== Career ==
=== Solo ===
In 2007, Lefebvre and Patrick Langlois from MusiquePlus created "Man of the Hour", a music podcast.

In early 2009, Lefebvre recorded an acoustic EP entitled You Are Here / Vous Êtes Ici. It was released on October 20, 2009, under Coalition Entertainment Inc. The first single "I Fall for You" was released on September 8, 2009. A music video was also released on YouTube, directed by Simple Plan bandmate, Chuck Comeau.

Lefebvre released a second EP, called Les Robots, in 2011. It was available for free upon release. He released his third EP More Sake Por Favor in 2012.

=== Collaboration with Katie Rox ===
In November 2010, Lefebvre and fellow Canadian musician Katie Rox released an EP entitled, Christmas Etc...

=== Production ===
Lefebvre has accumulated a number of production and songwriting credits, including on Canadian singer-songwriter Andee's debut album Black and White Heart. The lead single from the album, "Never Gone" won an Anglophone Song Award from SOCAN Montréal in 2015. Lefebvre has also produced Wilfred Le Bouthillier's fourth album, Je poursuis ma route and self-produced a Simple Plan cover of No Use for a Name's song "Justified Black Eye" for the Tony Sly tribute album, The Songs of Tony Sly: A Tribute.

== Equipment ==
Lefebvre currently uses Framus, specifically the Mayfield. He currently uses Mesa Boogie and Framus amplifiers. He uses a modified Boss chorus pedal and T-Rex Replica and Tremster.

== Discography ==
=== With Simple Plan ===
- No Pads, No Helmets...Just Balls (2002)
- Still Not Getting Any... (2004)
- Simple Plan (2008)
- Get Your Heart On! (2011)
- Taking One for the Team (2016)
- Harder Than It Looks (2022)

You Are Here/Vous Etes Ici (2009)

Track listing
No.	Title	Length
1.	"Décoller"	1:31
2.	"Comatose"	4:01
3.	"La Nouvelle Vie"	3:21
4.	"Good Night"	3:02
5.	"I Fall for You"	3:47
6.	"Life Goes On"	3:09
7.	"The One"	2:39

Les Robots (2011)

Track listing
No.	Title	Length
1.	"Fabrication"	1:17
2.	"Sending You A Letter"	3:30
3.	"Catch Me (with Katie Rox)"	3:11
4.	"Tu Me Manques"	2:37
5.	"The Last Time We Kiss"	3:06
6.	"Crossed Out"	3:38
7.	"Getting Stuck in my Head"	3:02

More Sake Por Favor (2012)

Track listing
No.	Title	Length
1.	"L'Histoire"	1:24
2.	"My Dear"	3:02
3.	"Always"	4:01
4.	"Au Secours"	3:13
5.	"Mystérieuse"	3:52
6.	"This Bed"	3:36
7.	"I Raise My Glass"	5:34

=== Sébastien & Katie Rox ===
Christmas Etc... (2010)

Track listing
No.	Title	Length
1.	"Stay (It's Christmas)"	3:15
2.	"Other Side"	3:35
3.	"Rich"	4:15

== Filmography ==
=== Director ===
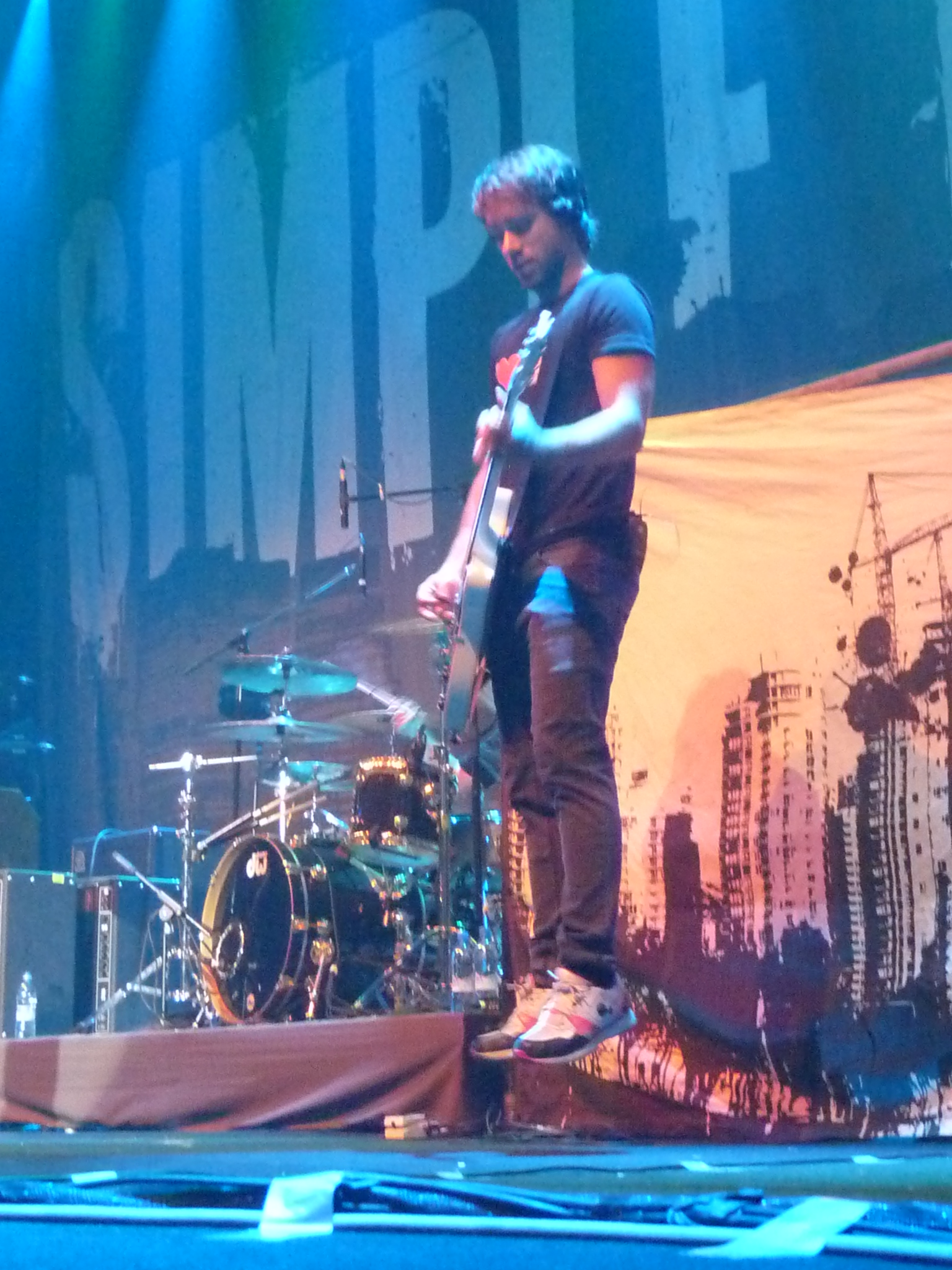
Lefebvre in Moscow, 18 August 2009.

- Simple Plan: Self Titled DVD (2008)
- Simple Plan: Still Not Getting Any... DVD (2004)
- Simple Plan: A Big Package for You (2003)

=== Actor ===
Year	Title	Role	Notes
2003	The New Tom Green Show		1 episode
2003	Simple Plan: A Big Package for You	Himself	
2004	What's New, Scooby Doo?	Himself (voice)	1 episode
2004	New York Minute	Himself	
2004	Simple Plan: Still Not Getting Any...	Himself	
Punk Rock Holocaust	Himself		
2005	Simple Plan: MTV Hard Rock Live	Himself	
2006–present	Man of the Hour	Himself	
2008	Simple Plan: Self Titled	Himself	
