= 2014 MuchMusic Video Awards =

Annual edition of the awards show

- Date: June 15, 2014
- Location: 299 Queen Street West
- Country: Canada
- Hosted by: Kendall Jenner, Kylie Jenner, Lauren Toyota, and Scott Willats

Highlights
- Most awards: Hedley (3)
- Most nominations: Drake; Hedley (6)
- Website: http://mmva.muchmusic.com

Television/radio coverage
- Network: Much, CTV

The 2014 MuchMusic Video Awards (MMVAs) was held on June 15, 2014 outside the Much headquarters in downtown Toronto. Kendall Jenner and Kylie Jenner served as co-hosts for the show.

The ceremony, which marked the 25th edition of the MMVAs, was simulcast live on Much and CTV.

== Winners and nominees ==
(winners in bold) Video of the Year

- Arcade Fire - "Afterlife"
- Drake - "Worst Behavior"
- **Hedley - "Anything"**
- SonReal - "Everywhere We Go"
- The Weeknd ft. Drake - "Live For"

Post-Production of the Year

- **City and Colour - "Thirst"**
- Hedley - "Crazy For You"
- Sam Roberts Band - "We're All in This Together"
- Serena Ryder- "What I Wouldn't Do"
- Tokyo Police Club - "Hot Tonight"

Dance Video of the Year

- A Tribe Called Red ft. Northern Voice - "Sisters"
- **Autoerotique - "Asphyxiation"**
- Chromeo ft. Toro Y Moi - "Come Alive"
- Keys N Krates - "Dum Dee Dum"
- Thugli - "Run This"

Director of the Year

- Arcade Fire - "Afterlife" Director: Emily Kai Bock
- Drake - "Worst Behavior" Directors: Director X & Drake
- Hedley - "Anything" Director: John JP Poliquin
- SonReal - "Everywhere We Go" Director: Peter Huang
- **Thugli - "Run This" Directors: [[Amos Le Blanc|Amos Le Blanc]] & Ohji Inoue**

Pop Video of the Year

- Down With Webster - "Chills"
- **Hedley - "Anything"**
- Mia Martina f. Dev - "La La/Danse"
- Serena Ryder- "What I Wouldn't Do"
- Tegan and Sara - "Goodbye, Goodbye"

Rock/Alternative Video of the Year

- Arcade Fire - "Reflektor"
- City and Colour - "Thirst"
- July Talk - "Guns + Ammunition"
- **Sam Roberts Band - "Shapeshifters"**
- Tokyo Police Club - "Hot Tonight"

Hip Hop Video of the Year

- Classified ft. B.o.B - "Higher"
- **Drake - "Worst Behavior"**
- D-Sisive - "Friend of Mine"
- P. Reign ft. A$AP Rocky - "We Them"
- SonReal - "Everywhere We Go"

MuchFact Video of the Year

- Autoerotique - Asphyxiation"
- Sam Roberts Band - "Shapeshifters"
- **SonReal - "Everywhere We Go"**
- Thugli - "Run This"
- Victoria Duffield - "More Than Friends"

International Video of the Year – Artist

- Avicii ft. Aloe Blacc - "Wake Me Up"
- Beyoncé ft. Jay-Z - "Drunk in Love"
- Iggy Azalea ft. Charli XCX - "Fancy"
- Kanye West - "Bound 2"
- Katy Perry ft. Juicy J - "Dark Horse"
- **Lorde - "Royals"**
- Miley Cyrus - "Wrecking Ball"
- Pharrell - "Happy"
- Selena Gomez - "Come and Get It"
- Taylor Swift ft. Ed Sheeran - "Everything Has Changed"

International Video of the Year – Group

- 5 Seconds of Summer - "She Looks So Perfect"
- Daft Punk ft. Pharrell Williams - "Lose Yourself to Dance"
- Disclosure ft. Sam Smith - "Latch"
- Foster the People - "Coming of Age"
- **Imagine Dragons - "Demons"**
- Kings of Leon - "Supersoaker"
- Macklemore & Ryan Lewis ft. ScHoolboy Q & Hollis - "White Walls"
- Maroon 5 - "Love Somebody"
- Mumford & Sons - "Hopeless Wanderer"
- One Direction - "Story of My Life"

International Video of the Year by a Canadian

- Avril Lavigne - "Rock N Roll"
- **Drake ft. Majid Jordan - "Hold On, We're Going Home"**
- Justin Bieber - "All That Matters"
- MAGIC! - "Rude"
- The Weeknd - "Belong to the World"

Your Fave Video

- Arcade Fire - "Reflektor"
- Drake - "Worst Behavior"
- **Hedley - "Anything"**
- SonReal - "Everywhere We Go"
- The Weeknd ft. Drake - "Live For"

Your Fave Artist/Group

- Avril Lavigne
- Drake
- Hedley
- **Justin Bieber**
- The Weeknd

Your Fave International Artist/Group

- Imagine Dragons
- Katy Perry
- Lorde
- Miley Cyrus
- **Selena Gomez**

== Performers ==
Acts that performed during the show include:

- Hedley - "Crazy for You"
- Ed Sheeran - "Sing"
- MAGIC! - "Rude"
- Kiesza - "Hideaway"
- Lorde - "Tennis Court"/"Team"
- Sam Roberts Band - "We're All in This Together"
- Virginia to Vegas ft. Alyssa Reid - "We Are Stars"
- Imagine Dragons - "Demons"/"Radioactive"
- Ariana Grande - "Problem"

== Presenters ==
- Kendall Jenner and Kylie Jenner - presented International Video of the Year – Artist
- Victoria Duffield and Nikki Yanofsky - introduced Your Fave International Artist/Group nominees
- Jena Malone - introduced MAGIC!
- Laura Vandervoort - presented International Video of the Year – Group
- Mia Martina and SonReal - introduced Your Fave Video nominees
- Kellan Lutz - introduced Kiesza
- Down with Webster - presented Rock/Alternative Video of the Year
- Fefe Dobson and Arkells - introduced Your Fave Artist/Group nominees
- P.K. Subban - presented Pop Video of the Year
- The Weeknd - introduced Sam Roberts Band
- Serena Ryder - presented Your Fave International Artist/Group
- Marianas Trench - introduced Virginia to Vegas and Alyssa Reid
- Kiernan Shipka - presented Your Fave Video
- Colton Haynes - introduced Imagine Dragons
- Chloë Grace Moretz - presented Your Fave Artist/Group
- Ed Sheeran - presented Video Of The Year
