= Casse comme du verre =

Studio album by Priscilla Betti
- Released: 10 December 2007
- Recorded: France
- Genre: Pop
- Label: Jive Records

Priscilla Betti chronology
Bric à brac (2005)	Casse comme du verre (2007)	La vie sait (2017)

Casse comme du verre is the fifth album recorded by French singer Priscilla Betti. It was released on 10 December 2007 on the Jive Records label.

The album reached No. 111 on the French SNEP Albums Chart and was ranked in the top 200 for seven weeks. Two singles were released : "Chante !", which didn't chart, and "Casse comme du verre". Casse comme du verre was Priscilla's least successful album to date.

Tracks from the album were used in the TV series Chante!, which starred Priscilla.

The album sold 30,000 copies.

== Track listing ==
1. "Je dis stop" – 3:26
2. "Chante !" – 4:02
3. "Casse comme du verre" – 3:29
4. "The winner is..." – 3:23
5. "Ma place au soleil" – 4:17
6. "Prête à me battre" – 3:28
7. "Tu me donnes" – 3:34
8. "À ta cheville" – 4:06
9. "Ma peur" – 3:37
10. "L'homme que j'aime" – 3:06
11. "Un ami" – 4:12
12. "Je vais m'en sortir" – 4:05

== Charts ==
Chart (2008)	Peak position
Belgian (Wallonia) Albums Chart	100
French SNEP Albums Chart	111
