= Bric à brac =

Studio album by Priscilla Betti
- Released: 27 June 2005
- Recorded: France
- Genre: Pop rock
- Label: Jive Records

Priscilla Betti chronology
Une fille comme moi (2004)	Bric à brac (2005)	Casse comme du verre (2007)

Singles from Bric à brac
- 1. "Bric à brac" Released: 27 June 2005; 2. "Je danse donc je suis" Released: 17 October 2005

Bric à brac is the fourth album recorded by French singer Priscilla Betti. It was released on June 27, 2005 by Jive Records.

The album was less successful than Priscilla's previous ones in terms of sales and chart trajectories; it peaked at number 20 on the French SNEP Albums Chart on 20 July 2005, but dropped quickly, totaling four weeks in the top 50 and 23 weeks on the chart (top 200). The album had two singles, "Bric à brac" and "Je danse donc je suis", which achieved moderate success in France, reaching chart positions 31 and 45, respectively.

The album sold 50,000 copies.

== Track listing ==
1. "Bric à brac" — 4:12
2. "Je danse donc je suis" — 4:26
3. "Ce soir j'ai choisi..." — 3:57
4. "Tout est à refaire" — 3:47
5. "Fuir" — 4:14
6. "Tout nouveau tout beau" — 3:55
7. "Te rendre doux" — 3:37
8. "Si tout est fini" — 3:39
9. "L'amour et moi" — 4:18
10. "Loin d'ici" — 3:17
11. "Bric à brac" (remix) — 5:54

== Charts ==
Chart (2005)	Peak position
Belgian (Wallonia) Albums Chart	74
French Albums Chart	20
