= Nikki Cleary =

American pop-rock singer

Brittney Rose "Nikki" Cleary (born May 11, 1988, Albany, New York) is an American pop-rock singer.

She first entered the pop market with the song "I.M. Me" while still using her given name. Her first album, Everything I Wished For, was released by the Free Falls record label in 2002 after two years of recording. The album reached #45 on the Billboard Top Independent Albums chart. When Cleary signed with Jive Records in summer 2002, they asked to change her name because they already had a Britney on their roster. Her eponymous debut album was released a year later.

She appeared on a Nickelodeon Kids' Choice Awards record in 2003, with her single "1, 2, 3". She also performed on Nickelodeon's All That. Cleary also did a version of "Summertime Guys", used on the Kim Possible soundtrack. Her song "Hated" was on the Mean Girls film soundtrack.

Cleary attended Mohonasen's Draper Middle School in Schenectady, New York, and Clayton A. Bouton High School in Voorheesville, New York. She was married in summer 2009 and has four children.

== Discography ==
- Everything I Wished For (2002)
- Nikki Cleary (2003)
