= Priscilla Betti =

French singer

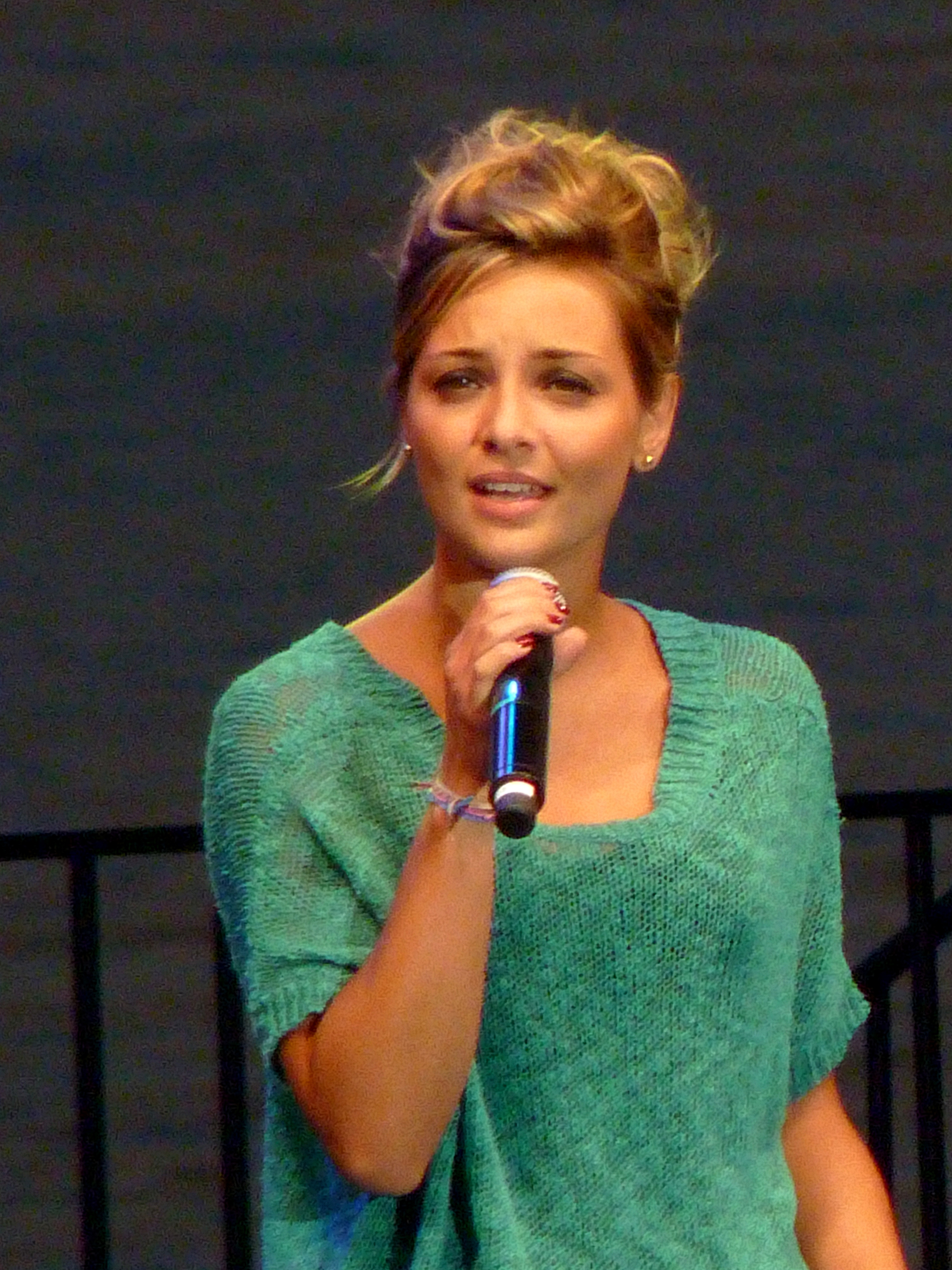
- Betti in 2012

Background information
- Born: Préscillia Cynthia Samantha Betti; 2 August 1989 (age 37); Nice, Alpes-Maritimes, Provence-Alpes-Côte d'Azur, France
- Genres: Chanson, pop
- Occupations: Singer, actress
- Years active: 2001–present
- Labels: Sony BMG; Jive Records; Begin Prod
- Website: priscillabetti.fr

Préscillia Cynthia Samantha Betti (born 2 August 1989 in Nice), known professionally as Priscilla or Priscilla Betti, is a French singer and actress. She released her first single at the age of 12, and has released six albums. She played the main role of Tina Ravel in the French teen musical TV series Studio 24 from 2008 to 2011.

== Biography ==
Priscilla Betti was born on 2 August 1989 into a family living in Nice, Alpes-Maritimes, Provence-Alpes-Côte d'Azur.

Her mother, Annie takes care of her career and her father, Jean-Pierre, is a painter in letters. Priscilla has two sisters: Sandra who is also a singer and Séverine who is a pharmacy assistant.

When Priscilla was eleven years old, she took part in the television children's talent show Drôles de petits champions, on 23 February 2001, on TF1, and was noticed by a producer from the American company Metro-Goldwyn-Mayer, Patrick Debort. On 25 September, she released her first single "Quand je serai jeune" under the record company Sony BMG.

That same year, Priscilla went to New York City and met her idol Britney Spears, who presented her with a Gold record for her single "Quand je serai jeune".

Betti's first album, Cette Vie nouvelle, was released in June 2002. It was certified Silver in France for sales of 50,000 copies. Her second album, Priscilla was released only six months after the first one, in December 2002. The album's first single, "Regarde-moi (teste-moi, déteste-moi)" was certified Gold in France for sales over 250,000 copies. The second single, "Tchouk tchouk musik", was certified Silver for sales over 250,000 copies. Priscilla sold over 100,000 copies in France, and was certified Gold.

Betti's third album, Une Fille comme moi, was released in early 2004. The first single, "Toujours pas d'amour", peaked at number five on the French singles chart and was certified Silver in France for sales over 250,000 copies. The album peaked at number eight on the album chart, and was certified Gold in France.

After following traditional schooling until the end of 8th grade, she decided not to enter secondary school, instead taking correspondence courses so that she could better concentrate on her artistic career.

Betti's fourth album, Bric à brac, was released in the summer of 2005. It peaked at number 20 on the French albums chart.

Starting from February 2008 Betti played the main role of Tina Ravel in the musical teen TV series Studio 24 on France 2 in the block programming KD2A. The fourth and last season aired in 2011. In addition to France, the series was also shown in Belgium, Italy and Brazil. Songs from the first season were released as Betti's fifth album, Casse comme du verre, in December 2007. The album peaked only at number 111 on the French albums chart.

In the fall of 2014 Betti made her stage debut as the lead in a stage adaptation of the musical Flashdance which was shown in Théâtre du Gymnase in Paris until March 2015.

In 2015, she participated in season 6 of Danse avec les stars (the French version of Dancing with the Stars) with her partner Christophe Licata. They finished as runners-up.

== Discography ==
=== Studio albums ===
| Year | Title | Date of release | Certification (France) | Peak position | | | |
|---|---|---|---|---|---|---|---|
| Year | Title | Date of release | Certification (France) | FR | FR (DD) | BE (WA) | SUI |
| 2002 | Cette Vie nouvelle | June 2002 | Silver (2003) | 18 | — | 44 | 53 |
| 2002 | Priscilla | December 2002 | Gold (2003) | 16 | — | 40 | 72 |
| 2004 | Une Fille comme moi | February 2004 | Gold (2004) | 8 | — | 38 | 83 |
| 2005 | Bric à Brac | June 2005 | — | 20 | — | 74 | — |
| 2007 | Casse comme du verre | December 2007 | — | 111 | — | 100 | — |
| 2017 | La vie sait (Note: Released under the name Priscilla Betti) | May 2017 | — | 35 | — | 102 | — |

=== Singles ===
| Year | Title | Date of release | Certification (France) | Peak position | | | | Album |
|---|---|---|---|---|---|---|---|---|
| Year | Title | Date of release | Certification (France) | FR | FR (DD) | BE (WA) | SUI | Album |
| 2001 | "Quand je serai jeune" | September 2001 | Gold (2001) | 10 | — | 23 | — | Cette Vie nouvelle |
| 2002 | "Cette Vie nouvelle" | March 2002 | — | 9 | — | 36 | — | Cette Vie nouvelle |
| 2002 | "Bla bla bla" | June 2002 | — | 37 | — | — | — | Cette Vie nouvelle |
| 2002 | "Regarde-moi (teste-moi, déteste-moi)" | December 2002 | Gold (2003) | 5 | — | 9 | 81 | Priscilla |
| 2003 | "Tchouk tchouk musik" | April 2003 | Silver (2003) | 7 | — | 38 | 47 | Priscilla |
| 2004 | "Toujours pas d'amour" | February 2004 | Silver (2004) | 5 | — | 21 | 39 | Une Fille comme moi |
| 2004 | "Toi c'est moi" | April 2004 | — | 16 | — | — | — | Une Fille comme moi |
| 2004 | "Jalousie" | September 2004 | — | 21 | — | — | — | Une Fille comme moi |
| 2005 | "Bric à brac" | June 2005 | — | 31 | — | — | — | Bric à brac |
| 2005 | "Je danse donc je suis" | October 2005 | — | 45 | — | — | — | Bric à brac |
| 2006 | "Mission Kim Possible" | June 2006 | — | — | — | — | — | Mission Kim Possible |
| 2007 | "Chante!" | November 2007 | — | — | — | — | — | Casse comme du verre |
| 2008 | "Casse comme du verre" | 2008 | — | — | — | — | — | Casse comme du verre |
| 2015 | "Moi je chante" | 11 December 2015 | — | 109 | — | — | — | |
| 2016 | "Changer le monde" | December 2016 | — | 119 | — | — | — | La vie sait |
| 2017 | "La vie sait" | January 2017 | — | 116 | — | — | — | La vie sait |

== Filmography ==
=== Fiction ===
- 1999: Annie as Annie (dialogue and singing in the French dub version, later version for DVD and video)
- 2004: Mean Old Albert as Chelsea (theatrical feature film)
- 2008-2011: Studio 24 as Tina Ravel (lead role in television series)
- 2015: Secret d'Hiver as Émilie (unreleased crowdfunded feature film)
- 2017: Nos chers voisins as Anaïs (guest star in the episode Nos chers voisins au ski)

=== Reality shows ===
- 2015: Danse avec les Stars season 6 - contestant, finalist
- 2018: Celebrity Island - contestant

== On stage ==
- 2014-2016: Flashdance as Alex Owens

== Bibliography ==
- Priscilla c'est moi, Michel Lafon Ed. (2003)
- Priscilla, Stéphanie-Anne Euranie, Rouchon Ed. (2003)
- Priscilla une étoile montante, Rouchon Ed. (2006)
- Chante !, Catherine Kalengula, Hachettes Ed. (2008)
- Chante !, Pilot et Torta, Soleil Productions Ed. (will be published on 9 July 2008)
