= Natalise =

American singer-songwriter

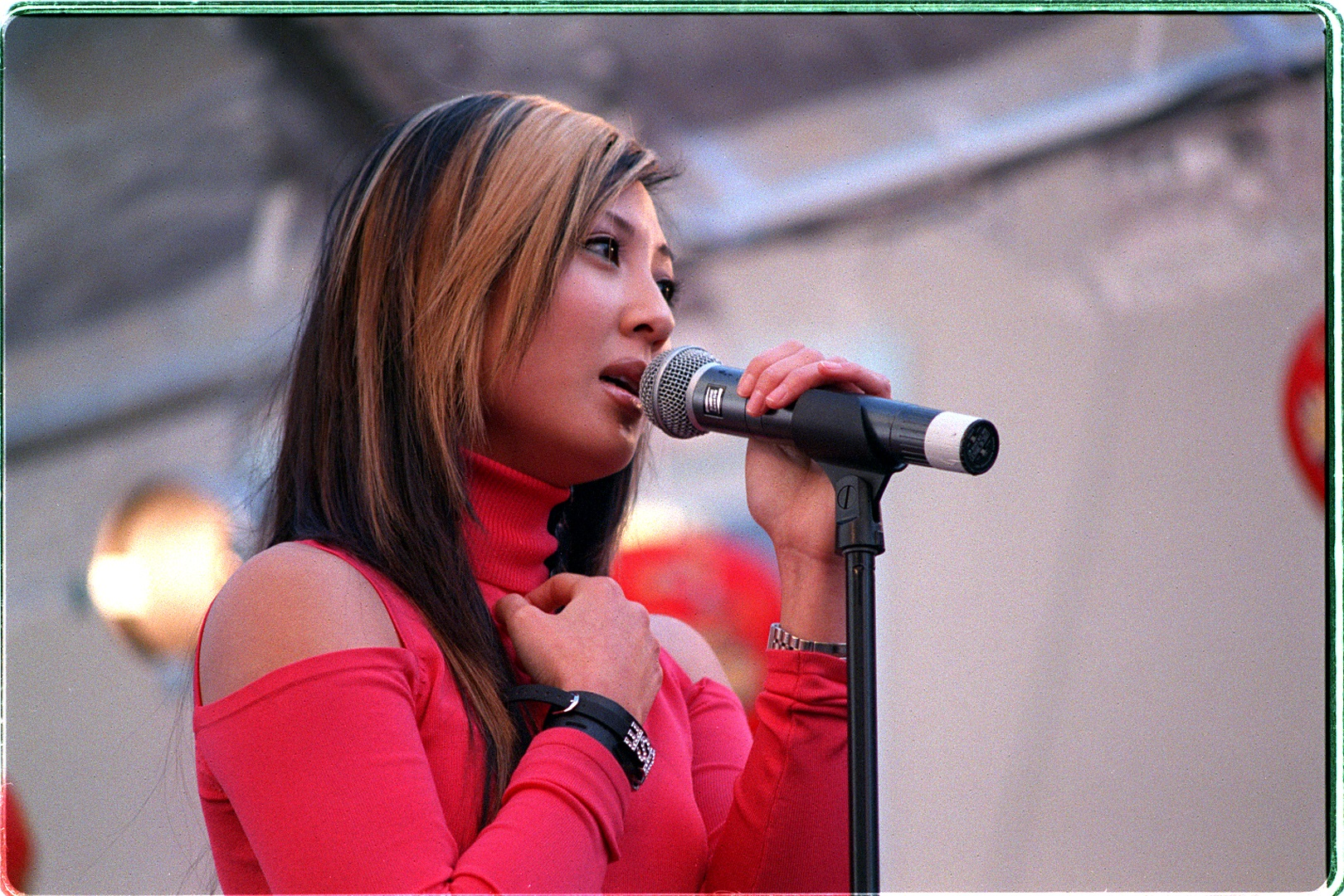
- Natalise in San Francisco, 2004

Background information
- Genres: Pop, Acoustic, Electronic, Dance
- Occupations: singer-songwriter
- Instruments: Singing, piano, guitar
- Years active: 2002–present
- Labels: Stars823 Records
- Website: http://www.natalisemusic.com

Natalise (born Robin Nathalis Chow, on September 27, 1985) is an American singer-songwriter. Natalise has been featured on television networks such as the WB, UPN, CBS, ABC, and MTV. She is also known for her appearances in The New York Times, Blender, and Maxim.

Natalise's first single "Love Goes On" from the album Forever Now was made popular when it aired on San Francisco's KYLD, Wild 94.9. Her subsequent singles "Wonderful" and "Enough" also received airplay on San Francisco's pop/adult AC station Alice 97.3. Natalise's second album I Came to Play received awards for Best Dance CD, Best Produced, Best Video by a Female, and Best Dance Song by Muse's Muse. Natalise was also voted "Girlfriend of the Day" in August 2008 by Maxim and "Video of the Week" by Blender.com. Many of Natalise's songs, including "The Hotness" and "I Came to Play" were heard on various MTV programs, such as "Yo Momma," "My Super Sweet Sixteen," and "Next." She was also heard on "Degrassi: The Next Generation" and "One Tree Hill."

Natalise has performed at various Los Angeles iconic venues, such as the House of Blues, the Roxy, and the Viper Room. She has also sung the National Anthem for the Golden State Warriors on many occasions.

== Career ==
Natalise started taking piano lessons when she was 3, dance at 7, and went on to study at the San Francisco Conservatory of Music, focusing on Opera and Musical Theatre from the age of eight to 14. During her early teens, she also sang in her church choir, as well as traveled and competed as a jazz singer with her high school band.

Natalise attended Stanford University, graduating with high-honors in three years with a degree in Communication with a focus in Journalism. She also received her MBA from Stanford Graduate School of Business.

Natalise resides in Los Angeles.

== Discography ==
=== Albums ===
- Forever Now (2003)
- I Came to Play (2005)

=== Singles ===
- "Love Goes On" (2003)
- "Wonderful" (2003)
- "Enough" (2006)
- "Open Me" (2011)
