= Regarde-moi (teste-moi, déteste-moi) =

Single by Priscilla

from the album Priscilla
- B-side: "Prissou"
- Released: 9 December 2002
- Recorded: France
- Genre: Pop
- Length: 3:27
- Label: Jive
- Songwriter(s): Bertrand Châtenet; Philippe Osman
- Producer(s): Bertrand Châtenet; Philippe Osman; Patrick Debort

Priscilla singles chronology
"Bla bla bla" (2002)	"Regarde-moi (teste-moi, déteste-moi)" (2002)	"Tchouk tchouk musik" (2003)

"Regarde-moi (teste-moi, déteste-moi)" is a song recorded by French singer Priscilla. It was released on December 9, 2002 in France and in January 2003 in Belgium and Switzerland as the first single from her second album Priscilla. The single reached the top ten in France and Belgium. In France it was certified Gold for selling over 250,000 copies, and it remains her best-selling single.

== Lyrics and music video ==
The song was written by Bertrand Châtenet, and the music was composed and arranged by Philippe Osman. Jérôme Devoise participated in the mixing of the song, with Bertrand Châtenet (both had worked with Mylène Farmer in the 1980s). Background vocals are performed by Priscilla.

Lyrically, Priscilla says that she likes to make herself conspicuous and that for this she does not hesitate to do something unusual. The music video shows Priscilla accompanied by a female friend in a fast-food restaurant, where she knocks over a young boy on a skateboard during the first verse, then a waitress during the second verse. When she sings the refrain, she performs a choreography with other girls. On 28 December 2011, Priscilla performed a slow version on her song on the show Les annees 2000 : le retour !, broadcast on M6.

== Chart performance ==
In France, the single charted for 29 weeks on the French Singles Chart (top 100), 23 of them in the top 50. It debuted at number 62 on 7 December 2002 and climbed regularly until reaching number five in its tenth week and stayed for six weeks in the top ten. It was certified Gold disc by the Syndicat National de l'Édition Phonographique, and ranked at number 23 on year-end chart. In Belgium (Wallonia), it entered the chart on 11 January 2003 at number 40, reached number nine five weeks later, where it stayed for two weeks and totalled 11 weeks on the chart. It was the 53rd best-selling single of the year in that region. In Switzerland, it marked the first appearance of Priscilla on the Swiss Singles Chart, briefly ranking at number 81 on 26 January 2003.

== Track listing ==
- CD single

No.	Title	Length
1.	"Regarde-moi (teste-moi, déteste-moi)"	3:27
2.	"Prissou"	4:15
3.	"Regarde-moi (teste-moi, déteste-moi)" (instrumental)	3:27

- Digital download

No.	Title	Length
1.	"Regarde-moi (teste-moi, déteste-moi)"	3:27

== Personnel ==
- Lyrics by Bertrand Châtenet
- Music by Philippe Osman
- Arrangement, programmation and all instruments by Philippe Osman
- Mixing by Bertrand Châtenet and Jérôme Devoise
- Mastered by André Perriat at Top Master studio
- Vocals by Priscilla
- Produced by B.Châtenet, P.Osman and P.Debort

== Charts ==
=== Weekly charts ===
Weekly charts for "Regarde-moi (teste-moi, déteste-moi)"
Chart (2003)	Peak position
Belgium (Ultratop 50 Wallonia)	9
Europe (Eurochart Hot 100 Singles)	17
France (SNEP)	5
Switzerland (Schweizer Hitparade)	81

=== Year-end charts ===
Year-end charts for "Regarde-moi (teste-moi, déteste-moi)"
Chart (2003)	Position
Belgium (Ultratop 50 Wallonia)	57
France (SNEP)	23

== Certifications ==
Certifications for "Regarde-moi (teste-moi, déteste-moi)"
Region	Certification	Certified units/sales
France (SNEP)	Gold	250,000^{*}
^{*} Sales figures based on certification alone.
