= Story of the Year discography =

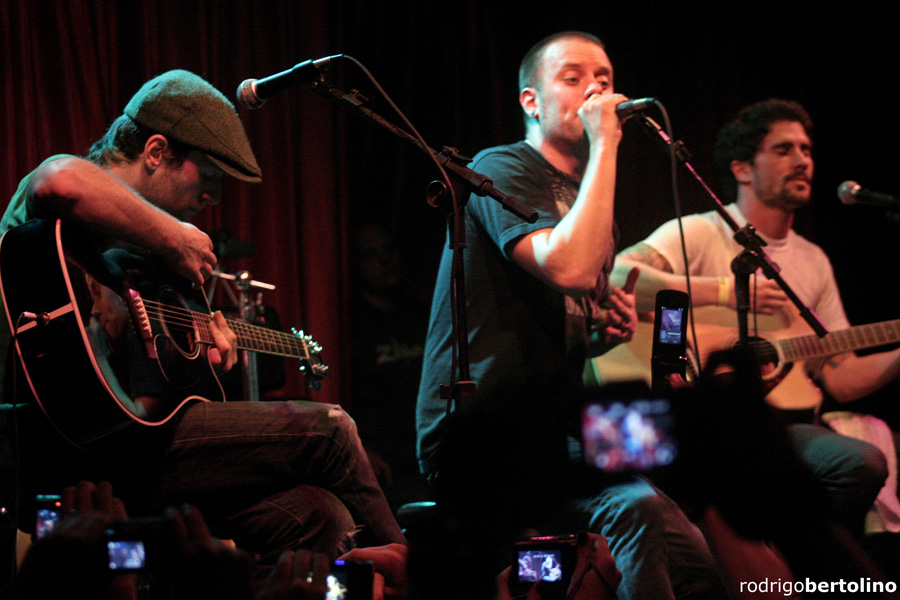
- Studio albums: 8
- Extended plays: 3
- Live albums: 1
- Singles: 26
- Video albums: 1
- Music videos: 23

The discography of the American rock band Story of the Year consists of eight studio albums, one live album, three extended plays, 26 singles, one video album and 23 music videos.

== Albums ==
=== Studio albums ===
List of studio albums, with selected chart positions and certifications
Title	Album details	Peak chart positions					Certifications
Title	Album details	US	US Alt.	US Rock	AUS	UK	Certifications
Page Avenue	Released: September 16, 2003; Label: Maverick; Formats: CD, CS, DL, LP	51	—	—	—	—	RIAA: Platinum
In the Wake of Determination	Released: October 11, 2005; Label: Maverick; Formats: CD, DL	19	—	—	38	149	
The Black Swan	Released: April 22, 2008; Label: Epitaph; Formats: CD, DL	18	4	4	25	136	
The Constant	Released: February 16, 2010; Label: Epitaph; Formats: CD, DL	42	4	5	88	—	
Page Avenue: Ten Years and Counting	Released: October 8, 2013; Label: Self-released; Formats: DL	—	—	—	—	—	
Wolves	Released: December 8, 2017; Label: Self-released; Formats: CD, DL, LP	—	—	—	—	—	
Tear Me to Pieces	Released: March 10, 2023; Label: SharpTone; Formats: CD, DL, LP	—	—	—	—	—	
A.R.S.O.N.	Released: February 13, 2026; Label: SharpTone; Formats: CD, DL, LP	—	—	—	—	—	
"—" denotes a recording that did not chart or was not released in that territory.

=== Live albums ===
List of live albums, with selected chart positions
Title	Album details	Peak chart positions	Certifications
Title	Album details	US	Certifications
Live in the Lou/Bassassins	Released: May 10, 2005; Label: Maverick; Formats: CD+DVD, digital download	138	RIAA: Gold

=== Video albums ===
List of video albums
Title	Album details
Our Time Is Now: Two Years in the Life of...	Released: May 13, 2008; Label: Image; Formats: DVD

== Extended plays ==
List of extended plays
Title	EP details
Three Days Broken (as Big Blue Monkey)	Released: July 1, 1998; Label: Self-released; Formats: CD
Truth in Separation (as Big Blue Monkey)	Released: September 26, 1999; Label: Self-released; Formats: CD
Story of the Year (as Big Blue Monkey)	Released: May 9, 2002; Label: Criterion; Formats: CD

== Singles ==
List of singles, with selected chart positions, showing year released and album name
Title	Year	Peak chart positions			Album
Title	Year	US Alt.	US Main. Rock	UK	Album
"Until the Day I Die"	2003	12	—	62	Page Avenue
"Anthem of Our Dying Day"	2004	10	—	—	Page Avenue
"Sidewalks"	2004	40	—	—	Page Avenue
"We Don't Care Anymore"	2005	28	38	—	In the Wake of Determination
"Take Me Back"	2006	—	—	—	In the Wake of Determination
"Wake Up"	2008	—	—	—	The Black Swan
"Message to the World"	2008	—	—	—	The Black Swan
"The Antidote"	2008	—	—	—	The Black Swan
"Terrified"	2009	—	—	—	The Black Swan
"To the Burial"	2009	—	—	—	The Constant
"I'm Alive"	2010	—	36	—	The Constant
"To the Burial"	2010	—	—	—	The Constant
"The Dream Is Over"	2010	—	—	—	The Constant
"Bang Bang"	2017	—	—	—	Wolves
"Miracle"	2017	—	—	—	Wolves
"I Swear I'm Okay"	2017	—	—	—	Wolves
"Real Life"	2022	—	—	—	Tear Me to Pieces
"Tear Me to Pieces"	2022	—	—	—	Tear Me to Pieces
"Take the Ride"	2022	—	—	—	Tear Me to Pieces
"War"	2023	—	40	—	Tear Me to Pieces
"2005"	2023	—	—	—	Tear Me to Pieces
"Afterglow"	2023	—	—	—	Tear Me to Pieces
"A Silent Murder" (Note: "A Silent Murder" originally appeared on the band's second studio album In the Wake of Determination as a hidden track before it was released as a standalone single.)	2023	—	—	—	Non-album singles
"Can't Slow Down" (with Kayzo)	2024	—	—	—	Non-album singles
"Gasoline (All Rage Still Only Numb)"	2025	—	15	—	A.R.S.O.N.
"Disconnected"	2026	—	—	—	A.R.S.O.N.
"—" denotes a recording that did not chart and/or was not released in that territory.

== Music videos ==
List of music videos, showing year released and director
Title	Year	Director(s)
"Until the Day I Die"	2003	Ryan Smith and Frank Borin
"Anthem of Our Dying Day"	2004	Joe Hahn
"Sidewalks"	2004	Villains
"We Don't Care Anymore"	2005	Kevin Kerslake
"Take Me Back"	2006	Ryan Smith
"Wake Up"	2008	Ryan Smith
"The Antidote"	2008	—N/a
"Terrified"	2009	—N/a
"I'm Alive"	2010	—N/a
"Bang Bang"	2017	Ryan Phillips
"Praying for Rain"	2017	Ryan Phillips
"How Can We Go On"	2018	Ryan Phillips
"Miracle"	2019	Jordan Phoenix & Ben Vogelsang
"Bulls on Parade" (featuring Bo Dean)	2020	—N/a
"Real Life"	2022	Jordan Phoenix
"Tear Me to Pieces"	2022	Jordan Phoenix
"Take the Ride"	2022	Jordan Phoenix
"War"	2023	Jordan Phoenix
"2005"	2023	Unknown
"Afterglow"	2023	Jordan Phoenix
"Gasoline (All Rage Still Only Numb)"	2025	Jordan Phoenix and Adam Russell
"Disconnected"	2026	Jordan Phoenix
"See Through"	2026	Jordan Phoenix
