= Addicted (Simple Plan song) =

2003 single by Simple Plan

- Single cover used for vinyl releases.

Single by Simple Plan

from the album No Pads, No Helmets...Just Balls
- B-side: "Surrender"; "One by One" (live)
- Released: February 24, 2003
- Genre: Pop-punk
- Length: 3:52
- Label: Lava
- Songwriters: Pierre Bouvier; Chuck Comeau; Arnold Lanni; Sébastien Lefebvre; Jeff Stinco
- Producer: Arnold Lanni

Simple Plan singles chronology
"I'd Do Anything" (2002)	"Addicted" (2003)	"Perfect" (2003)

Alternate single cover
- Single cover used for CD releases.

Music video
- "Addicted" on YouTube

"Addicted" is a song by Canadian rock band Simple Plan from the group's debut album No Pads, No Helmets...Just Balls. The band wanted "Addicted" as the first single; however, due to a film opportunity, "I'm Just a Kid" was chosen instead. It ultimately appeared on the soundtrack for the 2002 teen comedy film The New Guy.

"Addicted" was released to US radio on February 24, 2003. The CD version includes a cover of Cheap Trick song "Surrender" and the video for "Addicted", while the 7-inch vinyl version includes "Surrender" and a demo of "One by One". "Addicted" became Simple Plan's first top-50 hit in the United States, peaking at number 45 on the Billboard Hot 100. In 2004, it was re-released in Australia following the success of "Perfect" and reached number 10.

== Music video ==
The music video was directed by Ryan Smith and Frank Borin, also known as Smith n' Borin, whom previously directed the first two music videos for the band: "I'm Just a Kid" and "I'd Do Anything". In the clip, the band destroy possessions in a room, and ends with an explosion, inspired by an effect in the film The Natural (1984).

== Track listings ==
UK CD single

1. "Addicted" – 3:57
2. "Surrender" – 2:58
3. "Addicted" (video)

Australian CD single

1. "Addicted"
2. "Perfect" (acoustic version)
3. "Grow Up" (live in Japan)
4. "American Jesus" (live in Japan)
5. "Simple Plan Loves to Go Down... Under" (live and backstage footage)
6. Pat's scrapbook (exclusive Australian tour pictures)
7. "Addicted" (video)
8. "I'd Do Anything" (video)

== Charts ==
=== Weekly charts ===
Charts (2003–2004)	Peak position
Australia (ARIA)	10
Scotland Singles (Official Charts)	63
UK Singles (Official Charts)	63
UK Rock & Metal (Official Charts)	15
US Billboard Hot 100	45
US Pop Airplay (Billboard)	11

=== Year-end charts ===
Charts (2003)	Position
US Mainstream Top 40 (Billboard)	36

== Certifications ==
Region	Certification	Certified units/sales
United States (RIAA)	Gold	500,000^{‡}
^{‡} Sales+streaming figures based on certification alone.

== Release history ==
Region	Date	Format(s)	Label(s)	Ref.
United States	February 24, 2003	Alternative radio	Lava	
United Kingdom	June 23, 2003	7-inch vinyl; CD	Lava	
Australia (re-release)	August 16, 2004	CD	Lava	
