= Smith n' Borin =

American filmmaking duo

Smith n' Borin is the pseudonym for the filmmaking duo Ryan Smith and Frank Borin. They are known for directing music videos in the early 2000s, particularly within the pop-punk scene. They has directed music videos for Simple Plan, Bowling for Soup, Good Charlotte, New Found Glory, and Story of the Year, as well as Duran Duran, Xzibit and Cypress Hill.

Smith and Borin met as freshmen at Loyola Marymount University in 1997 and they developed a reputation for directing hip-hop music videos.

In 2005, Smith n' Borin were slated to directing a family comedy film for Lions Gate Films, titled Kidnapped and starring Lil' JJ and Bobb'e J. Thompson but it was cancelled.

Borin continued directing music videos, often solo or with other partners with credits including 5 Seconds of Summer, Calum Scott, and Becky G and went on to found the production company UnderWonder Content and has directed videos for Harry Styles, Zayn Malik, and Lil Nas X. Smith also continued directing music videos, with solo credits for Lostprophets and Breaking Benjamin; he has transitioned into documentary filmmaking. His recent work includes the Emmy-winning documentary NFL 360: Who If Not Us and the 2024 Tribeca Festival selection Soldiers of Song, both focusing on stories from Ukraine.

== Selected videography ==
- Bone Thugs-N-Harmony - "Can't Give it Up" (2000)
- New Found Glory - "Hit or Miss" (2001)
- Xzibit - "Get Your Walk On" (2001)
- Simple Plan - "I'm Just A Kid" (2002)
- Obie Trice featuring Eminem - "Rap Name" (2002)
- Cypress Hill - "Lowrider" (2002)
- Bowling for Soup - "Girl All the Bad Guys Want" (2002)
- Simple Plan - "I'd Do Anything" (2002)
- Good Charlotte - "The Anthem" (2003)
- Simple Plan - "Addicted" (2003)
- Good Charlotte - "Girls & Boys" (2003)
- Story of the Year - "Until the Day I Die" (2003)
- Simple Plan - "Don't Wanna Think About You" (2004)
- Bowling for Soup - "1985" (2004)
- Bowling for Soup - "Almost" (2005)
- Duran Duran - "What Happens Tomorrow" (2005)
- Rooster - "Come and Get Some" (2005)
