= Until the Day I Die =

Single by Story of the Year

from the album Page Avenue
- B-side: "Sidewalks" (acoustic version)
- Released: August 12, 2003
- Recorded: 2003
- Genre: Post-hardcore; emo; pop-punk; screamo
- Length: 3:55
- Label: Maverick; Reprise
- Songwriters: Dan Marsala; Ryan Phillips; Adam Russell; Philip Sneed; Josh Wills
- Producer: John Feldmann

Story of the Year singles chronology
"Until the Day I Die" (2003)	"Anthem of Our Dying Day" (2004)

Audio sample
- file; help

Music video
- "Until the Day I Die" on YouTube

"Until the Day I Die" is the debut single by American rock band Story of the Year. It is the second track on their debut album, Page Avenue (2003). "Until the Day I Die" was released to radio on August 12, 2003 and charted at number 12 on the Alternative Songs chart. It also charted in the UK at number 62. The song's success was bolstered by heavy rotation on MTV2 and Fuse.

== Background ==
When Goldfinger frontman John Feldmann first heard the band, he didn't just sign on to produce; he actively stripped down their songwriting. He had them play through songs at a house in Orange County and gave "brutal" feedback, telling them exactly what parts were filler. After Feldmann sent the demos for "Until the Day I Die," "Razorblades," and "Anthem of Our Dying Day" to Maverick Records, the label gave them total creative freedom. The band was surprised because they were only 20 or 21 at the time and didn't realize how much influence a major label usually exerted.

== Writing and recording ==
"Until the Day I Die" was written in the group's van while they were touring. The intro guitar riff was written in a 15-passenger van while the band was on a two-week tour with Goldfinger. Guitarist Ryan Phillips originally suggested "Until the Day I Die" as a band name, but Marsala felt it worked better as a song title. Once the title was set, the opening lyrics followed immediately. Feldmann played a massive role, helping the band refine their songs at a house in Orange County the night before they showcased for major label Maverick at The Viper Room in West Hollywood, California. The band had recently changed their name from Bigbluemonkey to Story of the Year when they signed with Maverick.

The band intentionally avoided screaming on some tracks to ensure they were radio-friendly. However, the "vulnerable" screamed bridge in "Until the Day I Die" felt natural and was kept in, which ended up being a revolutionary sound for mainstream rock radio at the time. The song "magically came together" after the intro riff and opening lyrics were composed.

While often interpreted as a romantic song, Marsala reveals it was originally about the band’s internal relationship—the love and hate dynamic of living in a van and being on the road constantly.

The dark imagery in the lyrics was heavily inspired by bands like Taking Back Sunday and Saves the Day.

== Release ==
"Until the Day I Die" was released to radio on August 12. The group wanted to tour for a year before their label Maverick Records started pushing a single. They grew up in the 1990s when labels were focused on investing in development. Russell, citing the Red Hot Chili Peppers and their song "Under the Bridge" as an example, said the band was afraid of being labelled sell-outs due to a big single. However, label executives was unwavering in their decision to release "Until the Day I Die". Around this time, Maverick Records was using BigChampagne. The company had a top 20 downloads section, based on data culled from peer-to-peer networks, which featured "Until the Day I Die". However, the song was receiving less airplay on radio than other artists. Jeremy Welt, head of new media at Maverick Records, convinced radio stations in certain markets to play the band during prime-time listening hours, which helped increase sales.

== Music video ==
A music video, directed by Ryan Smith and Frank Borin, also known as Smith n' Borin, was released along with the single in 2003. Dan Marsala said "We had no idea how to do a video — we just did everything by trial and error". The video was filmed at The Creepy Crawl in St. Louis in August of 2003. Because the band members were St. Louis locals, they were able to pack the tiny club with actual fans rather than hired extras. The "extended stage" was literally pieces of wood bolted onto the existing small stage to allow the band enough room to do their signature backflips and high-energy stunts. The venue had no air conditioning and was packed with people, creating the sweaty, high-energy "madness" seen in the final edit. The band notes the video is dated only by their "huge Dickies shorts" and early-2000s haircuts, but they credit Smith and Borin for capturing their live energy without relying on over-the-top tropes. The song's received heavy rotation on MTV2 and Fuse.

== Reception ==
Exclaim! writer Sam Sutherland cited "Until the Day I Die" as a good example of what the rest of Page Avenue sounds like with its appealing hooks and melodies, combined with an acceptable amount of screaming vocals and octave parts to please people who are seeking more of a bite to their music.

In March 2006, Cleveland Scene said Page Avenue and "Until the Day I Die" helped push screamo into the mainstream musical landscape. In March 2022, Cleveland.com ranked "Until the Day I Die" at number 79 on their list of the top 100 pop-punk songs. Alternative Press remarked, "if you were a teenager in the early 2000s, chances are you had the lyrics to Story of the Year’s breakout 2003 single “Until The Day I Die” as your AIM away message." They also said that the song's screamed bridge "polarized the industry in revolutionary ways when unclean vocals were a foreign concept on mainstream radio".

== In popular culture ==
The song featuring in a trailer for the 2004 sports drama film Friday Night Lights.

== Personnel ==
Personnel per booklet

Story of the Year

- Dan Marsala – lead vocals
- Ryan Phillips – lead guitar
- Adam Russell – bass
- Josh Wills – drums
- Philip Sneed – rhythm guitar (music video)
- Greg Haupt – rhythm guitar (recording)

Additional musicians

- John Feldmann – additional background vocals

Production

- John Feldmann – producer, engineer, mixing
- Mark Blewett – additional engineering
- Joe Gastwirt – mastering

== Charts ==
=== Weekly charts ===
Weekly chart performance for "Until the Day I Die"
Chart (2004)	Peak position
Scotland Singles (OCC)	81
UK Singles (OCC)	62
US Alternative Airplay (Billboard)	12

=== Year-end charts ===
Year-end chart performance for "Until the Day I Die"
Chart (2004)	Position
US Modern Rock Tracks (Billboard)	36
