= I'm Just a Kid =

2002 single by Simple Plan

Single by Simple Plan

from the album No Pads, No Helmets...Just Balls
- B-side: "One by One"; "Grow Up"
- Released: February 4, 2002
- Genre: Pop-punk; emo
- Length: 3:18
- Label: Atlantic; Lava
- Songwriters: Pierre Bouvier; Chuck Comeau; Arnold Lanni; Sébastien Lefebvre; Jeff Stinco
- Producer: Arnold Lanni

Simple Plan singles chronology
"I'm Just a Kid" (2002)	"I'd Do Anything" (2002)

Audio sample
- file; help

Music videos
- "I'm Just a Kid" on YouTube; "I'm Just a Kid" (Amazon Original version) on YouTube

"I'm Just a Kid" is a song by Canadian rock band Simple Plan. The song appeared on their first album, No Pads, No Helmets...Just Balls, and was released as their debut single on February 4, 2002. The song saw a resurgence in popularity in April 2020 on the social media platform TikTok, where the song was used in a challenge that involves family members re-creating childhood photos. On May 26, 2020, "I'm Just a Kid" was certified platinum by the Recording Industry Association of America (RIAA).

== Background ==
Lead singer Pierre Bouvier said he and drummer Chuck Comeau wrote "I'm Just a Kid" about how they felt when they attending high school, namely "feel[ing] like it's the end of the world". The band wanted "Addicted" as the first single; however, due to a film opportunity, "I'm Just a Kid" was chosen instead. It ultimately appeared on the soundtrack for The New Guy (2002).

== Music video ==
The music video for "I'm Just a Kid", directed by Frank Borin and Ryan Smith, also known as Smith n' Borin, which is based on the 2002 teen comedy film The New Guy, which the song is featured in, is about how an awkward, average guy (DJ Qualls) attempts to impress a popular girl (Eliza Dushku) by attempting to perform dangerous stunts, but other, more popular boys (played by the band members) interrupt to take his place. They fail to succeed and are injured, and the main characters look on with pained expressions of pity and a certain amount of schadenfreude. Ending with the average guy simply speaking to the girl and her walking off with him while the heavily injured popular boys watch in disbelief. There is also a surreal sequence, in which the archetypal popular boy, played by rhythm guitarist and backing vocalist Sébastien Lefebvre, is hit by a school bus. The video was made with actors from the movie The New Guy, such as Qualls and Tony Hawk. As such, it was released as an extra on the DVD and VHS of The New Guy. As well, in the video, there is a clip of Hawk taken from the final football game in the movie. Most of the scenes in the video were filmed at Long Beach Polytechnic High School in Long Beach, California.

== Track listing ==
1. "I'm Just a Kid" (single version)
2. "One by One"
3. "Grow Up"

== Certifications ==
Certifications for "I'm Just a Kid"
Region	Certification	Certified units/sales
New Zealand (RMNZ)	Gold	15,000^{‡}
United Kingdom (BPI)	Silver	200,000^{‡}
United States (RIAA)	2× Platinum	2,000,000^{‡}
^{‡} Sales+streaming figures based on certification alone.

== Release history ==
Release dates and formats for "I'm Just a Kid"
Region	Date	Format(s)	Label(s)	Ref.
United States	February 4, 2002	Alternative radio	Atlantic; Lava	
United States	February 25, 2002	Hot adult contemporary radio	Atlantic; Lava	
Australia	May 13, 2002	CD	Atlantic; Lava	

== Legacy ==
- A version of this song featuring LØLØ premiered in November 2022 as an Amazon Original song.
- A parody version titled "I'm An Adult" was made in 2024 by Calgary-based band CHILIØ, which rewrites the song from a grown-up perspective. Pierre Bouvier was part of the marketing for this version, and the parody gained popularity on TikTok.
- On March 3, 2026, American pop-punk band Bowling for Soup released a cover of the track, ahead of the two bands' joint "Bigger Than You Think!" summer tour. The band described the cover as "our love letter to a band and a song that means the world to us" on their social media pages.
