= Lakeline =

Lakeline may refer to:

- Lakeline, Ohio
- Lakeline Mall
- Lakeline (Capital MetroRail station)
