= In the Wake of Determination =

Studio album by Story of the Year
- Released: October 11, 2005
- Recorded: April–May 2005
- Studio: Gravity, Chicago, Illinois; The Steamy Nook, St Louis, Missouri
- Genre: Post-hardcore; alternative metal
- Length: 45:23
- Label: Maverick
- Producer: Steve Evetts; Story of the Year

Story of the Year chronology
Live in the Lou/Bassassins (2005)	In the Wake of Determination (2005)	The Black Swan (2008)

Singles from In the Wake of Determination
- 1. "We Don't Care Anymore" Released: August 16, 2005; 2. "Take Me Back" Released: January 17, 2006

In the Wake of Determination is the second studio album by American rock band Story of the Year and it was released on October 11, 2005. After the Page Avenue tour ended in late 2004, the band started working with producer Steve Evetts in 2005, to record their second studio album. The album is much heavier sounding than the previous album. As of October 2007, the album had sold 180,000 units and failed to achieve the same success that the band's two previous releases had. Although not as successful as its predecessor, the album debuted at No. 19 on the Billboard 200.

The album was the band's last release on a major label, as they left Maverick Records the following year before signing with independent label Epitaph Records.

== Background ==
Story of the Year released their debut album Page Avenue in September 2003 through major label Maverick Records. The album, which was produced by John Feldmann, received substantial airplay at radio and video outlets. By April 2004, the album was certified gold in the US. Vocalist Dan Marsala said the success of the album "started to get to all of us ... [We] got lumped in with all of these new bands ... that aren't really that good". Marsala became critical of Feldmann, stating that Feldmann "originally changed our sound. All of his records have the same sort of sound".

In July 2004, MTV reported that the group would start recording their next album in January 2005. In August, Marsala said the group were working on new material. After the touring cycle for Page Avenue concluded in late 2004, the group immediately began writing for their second album. Most of the writing sessions took place at guitarist Ryan Phillips' house, which also acted as a practice area. The writing sessions consisted of the group jamming eight hours a day for five days a week. Demos were recorded with Mbox and drum machine software.

== Recording ==
Opting not to work with Feldmann again, the group brought in Steve Evetts to produce. Marsala said one of the reasons they chose Evetts was due to him producing some of Marsala's favorite albums. Marsala added that Evetts let the group have free rein in regards to doing whatever they wanted. The group wanted to capture their live sound, which Marsala said was a bit heavier than what was heard on Page Avenue. In late March, they started pre-production, which lasted into mid-April. Following this, they began recording drums at Gravity Studios in Chicago, Illinois. Here, the group performed alongside drummer Josh Wills while he tracked drums.

In late April, sessions moved to Phillips' personal studio, The Steamy Nook in St Louis, Missouri. Phillips reasoned that it was better to do it at home since they would have more time to record, since travelling wouldn't be a factor. They began tracking guitars until early May. Phillips tracked his guitar solos in a single day, and by the end, "there was skin hanging off all of my fingers and I could barely bend the strings anymore." Evetts engineered the sessions with assistance from Allan Hessler. The recordings were mixed by Evetts at Bay 7 in Valley Glen, California, before being mastered by Tom Baker at Precision Mastering.

== Composition ==
In the Wake of Determination drew comparison to Thrice, with Marsala's voice recalling Bad Religion frontman Greg Graffin. Discussing the title, Marsala said: "[W]e knew exactly what we wanted to do, and we knew how we wanted to come across. We were just really determined ... That was our mindset the entire time." All of the music and lyrics were written by the band. After the music was written, Marsala and bassist Adam Russell would get together and fit the lyrics to it. On some occasions, Marsala would bring a lot of lyrics that required minor tweaking. On other occasions, the pair would be in a room for hours before coming up with a line. Throughout the process, some of the members were worried about living up to the expectations of Page Avenue. For this album, Phillips focused on making his solos complement the song, fit within the structure, and come across as more melodic. On the demos, Phillips' solos featured tapping and shredding, something that he realized was due to simply wanting "gnarly solos."

=== Tracks 1–5 ===
"We Don't Care Anymore" was one of the last songs written for the album. Marsala said the song was about "doing things for yourself, not for the approval of others." According to Phillips, the track was a result of an agreement between him and his girlfriend: "I got all pissed off, got up, opened up Pro-tools, and started recording shit. By 6 am I had the entire song recorded." "Take Me Back" drew comparison to Siren Song of the Counter Culture (2004)-era Rise Against. It talks about growing up and learning how ignorance is bliss. Russell claimed half of the lyrics happened by accident, due to him and Marsala writing a few pages of lyrics about the same topic. According to Phillips, the song's initial iteration "didn't work", so the group re-worked it until it evolved into a "full on rock tune."

With "Our Time Is Now", Marsala aimed to write a positive song that "made people want to get up off their ass and do something". The track bounces between the groove metal and punk rock styles; Marsala took inspiration from his favorite hardcore punk albums. Marsala said "Taste the Poison" was about "any kind of addiction." He explained: "I've seen a lot of friends let things consume them and in the long run it ends up ruining everything they've worked for." The track originally ran for over 6 minutes, however, when the group tried working on it, they initially had no success with it. Marsala wrote the majority of lyrics for "Stereo" while on a plane. He said it was about the state of the music industry and how people in it were focused on making money instead of enjoying the music they write. Russell said the track had "all the cool elements" of Page Avenue mixed in with "more intensity and heaviness."

=== Tracks 6–12 ===
"Five Against the World" originally had a different chorus, which Marsala said "just wasn't strong enough" compared to the verses. They came up with another chorus for it during recording. Marsala said the track was about how far they've progressed as a group. Phillips was inspired to write the song after watching Cocktail (1988). Russell said it had elements of Pantera, Foo Fighters, Boston and hardcore punk. "Sleep" was nearly left off the album. Guitarist Philip Sneed said the track lacked vocals and the structure needed work. After choosing all of the songs intended for the album, Phillips showed some unused demos to Evetts. Upon hearing the one for "Sleep", he insisted that it be recorded. The group subsequently rewrote it. "Meathead" displays the band's hardcore punk origins; the music for it was written six months before lyrics were added. Marsala was struggling with what to write about for it until he and Russell "realized that we needed a song about tough guy assholes."

"March of the Dead" was the first track the group worked on for the album. Marsala said the track is "just encouraging people not to be lead blindly into any situation." It originally featured several time signatures and tempo changes until the group worked on it during pre-production. The chorus initially existed as four separate ideas that were combined into one. With "Pay Your Enemy", Marsala wanted to write "a good heavy sing along" track. The guitar riff in the bridge was taken from a Page Avenue outtake. Marsala was hesitant with "Wake Up the Voiceless" when Phillips showed him the track as he thought it sounded more like Survivor. Wills said the song had an "Eye of the Tiger"-feel to it. ""Is This My Fate?" He Asked Them" tackles the theme of discrimination against the LGBT community. Phillips came up with the main riff for it when he was jamming with a friend of his. Russell, who normally did not write music, came up with the riff in the chorus. The album's hidden track "A Silent Murder / Slow Jam" was conceived as the intro for "Taste the Poison". Phillips said it was split into separate tracks after Marsala tracked "this awesome melody" over it.

== Release ==
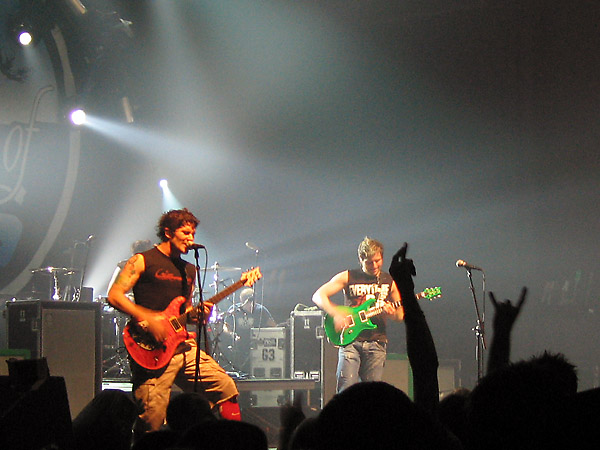
Guitarists Philip Sneed and Ryan Phillips performing on the 2006 Taste of Chaos tour.

On July 22, 2005, In the Wake of Determination was announced for release in October, and "We Don't Care Anymore" was posted on the group's Myspace profile. "Our Time Is Now" was posted on Myspace on August 2. The group performed on the Warped Tour between August 3 and 15. "We Don't Care Anymore" was released to radio on August 16. On the same day, "Take Me Back" was posted on the band's Myspace. Around this time, a music video was filmed for "We Don't Care Anymore". It was shot on a Los Angeles soundstage with director Kevin Kerslake. On August 27, the album's track listing and artwork were revealed. A few people came up with ideas for the artwork, which the group were hesitant to go with. As a result, Phillips and Russell created the final artwork.

In September and October, the group went on a US tour with Funeral for a Friend, Anberlin and He Is Legend. To coincide with the tour, the "We Don't Care Anymore" music video was released. Between September 22 and the album's release, the group uploaded behind-the-scenes clips taken during the recording process. In the Wake of Determination was released on October 11 through Maverick Records. The iTunes edition included the bonus track "Unheard Voices". Throughout the week, the group performed songs from it on Fuse's 7th Avenue Drop program. In October and November, the band performed on the International Taste of Chaos tour which visited Mexico, Australia, Japan, the UK and Germany. The band did a number of radio shows, and some headlining shows with support from Stretch Arm Strong, in December.

In January 2006, the group went tour with Every Time I Die, From First to Last, He Is Legend and Adair. "Take Me Back" was released to radio on January 17. Two days later, a music video was released for the track. From February to April, the band went on the 2006 Taste of Chaos North American tour; they were replaced by Thursday for the Canadian dates. Also in April, the band went on tour of the UK with Stretch Arm Strong and Bleed the Dream. To coincide with this, "Take Me Back" was released as a CD single with live versions of "Until the Day I Die" and "And the Hero Will Drown" as B-sides. In July, the band went on a tour Japan and South Korea, before touring Canada alongside Hawthorne Heights and Anberlin, In October and November, the band went on a tour of the US alongside Anberlin, Greeley Estates and Monty Are I.

== Reception ==
Professional ratings
Review scores
Source	Rating
AllMusic	3.5/5 stars
Chicago Tribune	Favorable
Robert Christgau	(dud)
Exclaim!	Favorable
Melodic	3/5 stars
Ox-Fanzine	7/10
Riverfront Times	Unfavorable
Rock Hard	9/10

AllMusic reviewer Johnny Loftus said the album was a "rewardingly heavy" collection that manages to be accessible for those that enjoyed the power ballad "Anthem of Our Dying Day" on Page Avenue. Loftus complimented Evetts production, saying he brought out the "hardness without shutting down" the group's melodic nature. Music critic Robert Christgau gave the album a "dud". Ariana Rock of Exclaim! wrote that the group created an "epic" record that "gets the kids singing along, stomping their feet and screaming their names." While complimenting the "crunching guitars and anthemic choruses", Rock compared the band to Thrice. Melodic staff member Kaj Roth said the album was a "natural" follow-up to Page Avenue in that it featured "all the classic ingredients from screamo emo to energetic riffs and melodic choruses."

Selling close to 42,000 copies in its first week, In the Wake of Determination charted at number 19 on the Billboard 200. It also charted at number 17 on the Digital Albums chart. Outside of the US, it charted at number 38 in Australia and number 149 in the UK. "We Don't Care Anymore" charted at number 11 on the Alternative Songs chart and number 36 on the Mainstream Rock chart.

== Track listing ==
All music composed by Story of the Year; all lyrics written by Dan Marsala and Adam Russell.

No.	Title	Length
1.	"We Don't Care Anymore"	3:31
2.	"Take Me Back"	4:07
3.	"Our Time Is Now"	4:08
4.	"Taste the Poison"	3:44
5.	"Stereo"	3:31
6.	"Five Against the World"	3:13
7.	"Sleep"	4:13
8.	"Meathead"	2:25
9.	"March of the Dead"	3:49
10.	"Pay Your Enemy"	3:09
11.	"Wake Up the Voiceless"	4:18
12.	""Is This My Fate?" He Asked Them"	5:15
Total length:		45:23

Hidden track
No.	Title	Length
1.	"A Silent Murder / Slow Jam"	2:36

iTunes bonus track
No.	Title	Length
13.	"Unheard Voice"	3:11
Total length:		48:34

== Personnel ==
Personnel per booklet.

Story of the Year

- Dan Marsala – lead vocals
- Adam Russell – bass, vocals, tuba
- Philip Sneed – rhythm guitar, vocals
- Josh Wills – drums, percussion
- Ryan Phillips – lead guitar

Production

- Steve Evetts – producer, engineer, mixing
- Story of the Year – producer, additional photos
- Allan Hessler – assistant engineer
- Tom Baker – mastering
- Ryan Phillips – artwork
- Adam Russell – CD design
- Chapman Baehler – band photos

== Charts ==
Chart performance for In the Wake of Determination
Chart (2005)	Peak position
Australian Albums (ARIA)	38
Canadian Albums (Nielsen SoundScan)	42
UK Albums (OCC)	149
UK Rock & Metal Albums (Official Charts)	10
US Billboard 200	19
