= Perfect (Simple Plan song) =

2003 single by Simple Plan

Single by Simple Plan

from the album No Pads, No Helmets...Just Balls
- B-side: "Perfect" (acoustic version); "Happy Together"
- Released: August 25, 2003
- Genre: Emo; pop-punk; power pop
- Length: 4:40 (promotional single version); 4:37 (album version); 4:07 (acoustic version)
- Label: Lava
- Songwriters: Arnold Lanni; Simple Plan
- Producer: Arnold Lanni

Simple Plan singles chronology
"Addicted" (2003)	"Perfect" (2003)	"Don't Wanna Think About You" (2004)

Music video
- "Perfect" on YouTube

"Perfect" is a song by Canadian rock band Simple Plan. It was serviced to US radio on August 25, 2003, and officially released as the fourth and final single from their debut studio album, No Pads, No Helmets...Just Balls (2002). The single's B-side, "Happy Together", is a cover of the 1967 Turtles song and was previously being featured in the soundtrack of the 2003 film Freaky Friday. "Perfect" became a top-40 hit in the band's native Canada as well as in Australia, New Zealand, and the United States.

== Background and composition ==
"Perfect" was written by the band with music composer Arnold Lanni. Regarding the lyric "Hey dad, look at me" and "I'm sorry I can't be perfect", drummer Chuck Comeau stated that this song "is his idea", to tell his parents that he is not perfect, he cannot be perfect because Comeau's parents were not supportive of his career choice, so in the song Comeau tells that he made it and he is not perfect and he cannot be perfect. Bassist and backing vocalist David Desrosiers also stated that this song was "about him" before he starts an acoustic version of the song. In another song of Simple Plan titled "Problem Child" (also sequel-alike for Perfect) from their fifth studio album Taking One for the Team (2016), Comeau stated that "Problem Child" is "a part 2 of Perfect". Comeau also stated that this song is about his brother who supports him in his music career.

== Chart performance ==
"Perfect" became Simple Plan's biggest hit on the US Billboard Hot 100, peaking at number 24. It was also a top-10 hit in Australia, peaking at number six, and reached number 14 in New Zealand. In 2005, the song become band's first top-10 single on the Canadian Singles Chart, peaking at number five.

== Music video ==
In the music video of the single, directed by Liz Friedlander, the band are playing on the roof of a house. Throughout the video, it shows how teens are trying to escape such pressure by letting everything out and realizing that they cannot keep their pain in any longer.

== Track listing ==
Standard CD single

1. "Perfect" (radio version)
2. "Perfect" (acoustic)
3. "Happy Together"

== Charts ==
=== Weekly charts ===
Chart (2003–2005)	Peak position
Australia (ARIA)	6
Canada (Nielsen SoundScan)	5
Canada CHR (Nielsen BDS)	13
Canada Hot AC Top 30 (Radio & Records)	28
New Zealand (Recorded Music NZ)	14
US Billboard Hot 100	24
US Adult Pop Airplay (Billboard)	24
US Pop Airplay (Billboard)	5

=== Year-end charts ===
Chart (2004)	Position
Australia (ARIA)	32
US Adult Top 40 (Billboard)	80
US Mainstream Top 40 (Billboard)	29

== Certifications ==
Region	Certification	Certified units/sales
Australia (ARIA)	Platinum	70,000^{^}
New Zealand (RMNZ)	Gold	15,000^{‡}
United States (RIAA)	Platinum	1,000,000^{‡}
^{^} Shipments figures based on certification alone.^{‡} Sales+streaming figures based on certification alone.

== Release history ==
Region	Date	Format(s)	Label(s)	Ref.
United States	August 25, 2003	Contemporary hit radio	Lava	
United States	November 10, 2003	Hot adult contemporary radio	Lava	
Australia	April 5, 2004	CD	Lava	
