= We Don't Care Anymore =

Single by Story of the Year

from the album In the Wake of Determination
- Released: August 16, 2005
- Recorded: 2005
- Genre: Post-hardcore, alternative metal
- Length: 3:31
- Label: Maverick, Reprise
- Songwriters: Dan Marsala; Ryan Phillips; Adam Russell; Philip Sneed; Josh Wills
- Producers: Steve Evetts, Story of the Year

Story of the Year singles chronology
"Sidewalks" (2004)	"We Don't Care Anymore" (2005)	"Take Me Back" (2006)

Music video
- "We Don't Care Anymore" on YouTube

"We Don't Care Anymore" is a song by American rock band Story of the Year. It was released as the first single from their second studio album, In the Wake of Determination. "We Don't Care Anymore" was posted on the group's MySpace profile on July 22, 2005 and then released to radio on August 16.

== Background ==
"We Don't Care Anymore" was one of the last songs written for the album. Lead singer Dan Marsala said the song was about "doing things for yourself, not for the approval of others." According to lead guitarist Ryan Phillips, the track was a result of an agreement between him and his girlfriend: "I got all pissed off, got up, opened up Pro-tools, and started recording shit. By 6 am I had the entire song recorded."

== Music video ==
Around this time, a music video was filmed for "We Don't Care Anymore". It was shot on a Los Angeles soundstage with director Kevin Kerslake.

== Personnel ==
- Dan Marsala – lead vocals
- Ryan Phillips – lead guitar
- Adam Russell – bass
- Josh Wills – drums
- Philip Sneed – rhythm guitar

== Use in media ==
The song is featured in the video games Arena Football and MLB 06: The Show.

== Charts ==
Chart (2005)	Peak position
US Mainstream Rock	38
US Active Rock	36
US Modern Rock Tracks	28
