= Lakeline Mall =

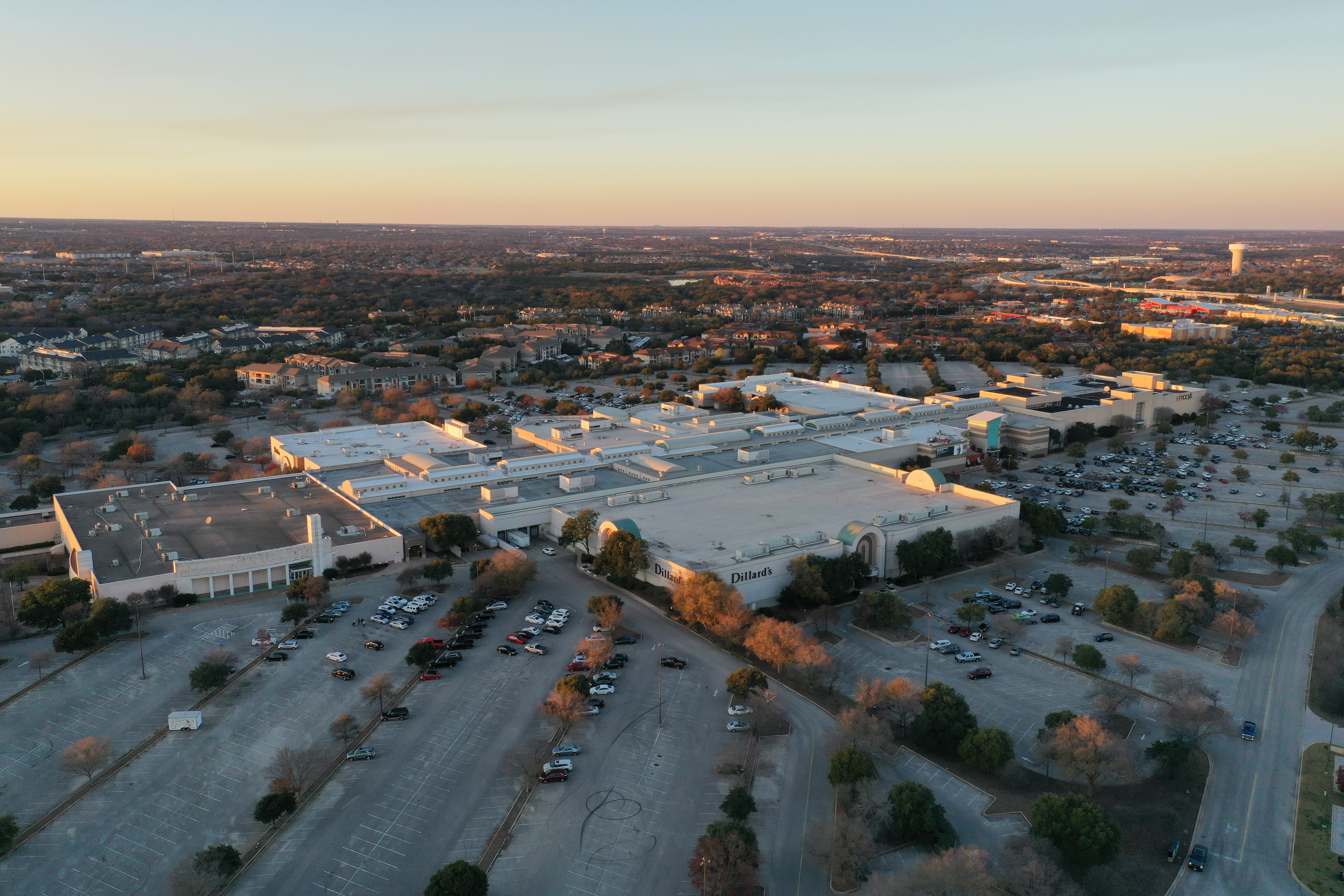
- Location: Austin, Texas, United States
- Coordinates: 30.470°N 97.807°W
- Opened: October 11, 1995; 31 years ago
- Developer: Simon Property Group
- Manager: Simon Property Group
- Owner: Simon Property Group
- Num. of stores: 109
- Num. of anchor tenants: 6 (4 open, 2 vacant)
- Floor area: 1,098,830 square feet (102,085 m^{2})
- Floors: 2
- Website: www.simon.com/mall/lakeline-mall

Lakeline Mall is a super-regional shopping mall located in north Austin, Texas, at the intersection of RR 620 and US 183. Although the mall has a Cedar Park postal code, it is physically within the City of Austin. Developed by Simon Property Group, the mall opened on October 11, 1995, following a nearly decade-long delay in construction. It has 1,098,830 square feet (102,085 m^{2}) of gross leasable area across two floors.

Of the mall's six anchor spaces, four are currently occupied by Macy's, JCPenney, Dillard's, and AMC Theatres. The former Sears and Dillard's Men & Children spaces are vacant.

== Description ==
Lakeline Mall is one of only two enclosed shopping malls in Austin, distinguishing it from the area's more common open-air "power centers." The mall spans two floors and totals 1,098,830 square feet (102,085 m^{2}) of gross leasable area.

The McBride Company, the interior designer, has stated the entertainment core's curved facades—housing the food court and movie theater—were intended to evoke the dome of the Texas State Capitol, which Austin's building code prohibits structures from exceeding in height. The mall's original 1995 decor featured large-scale replicas of Austin landmarks and hot air balloon displays with lighting effects simulating flames.

== History ==
Developers originally envisioned Lakeline Mall as a regional hub on par with Barton Creek Square. Groundbreaking was slated for late 1986, but the project stalled for nearly ten years due to the savings and loan crisis and the discovery of two endangered cave-dwelling invertebrates on the site, which required an incidental take permit from the U.S. Fish and Wildlife Service before construction could proceed.

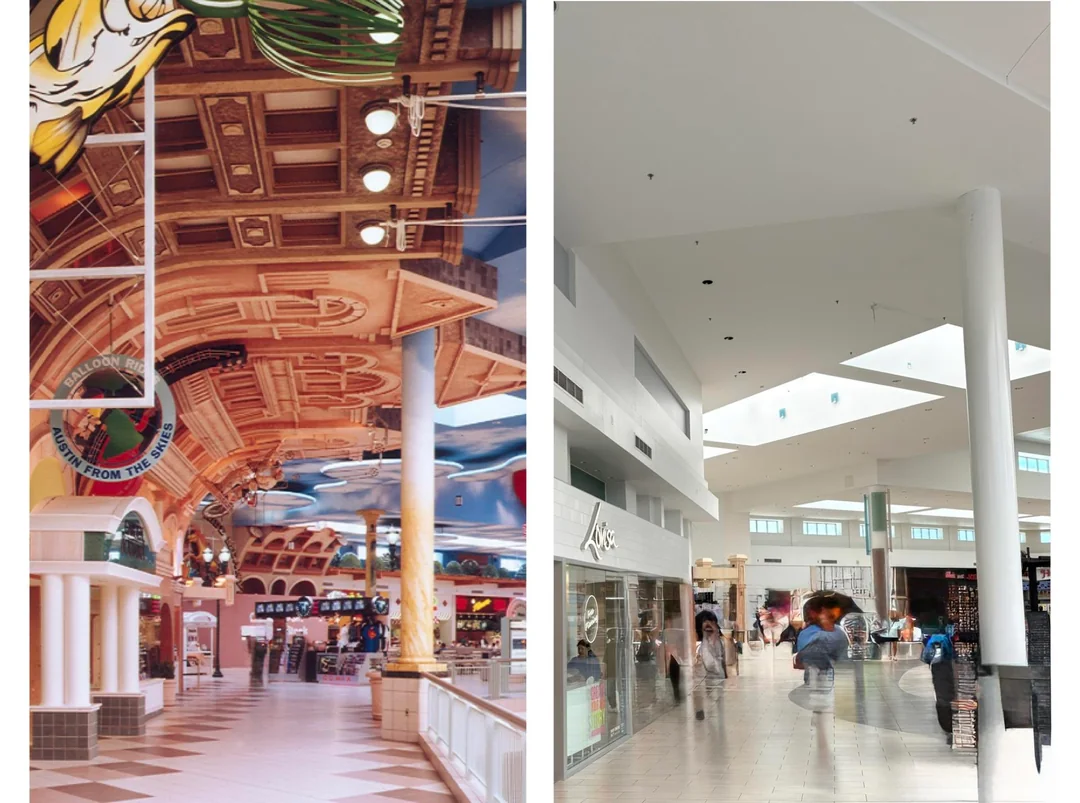
The Lakeline Mall food court before and after the 2013 renovation, showcasing the removal of the original hot air balloons and themed Austin landmark replicas.

The mall finally opened on October 11, 1995, debuting a highly themed interior by The McBride Company. The original decor featured large-scale replicas of Austin landmarks and hot air balloons equipped with lighting effects that simulated firing flames. The mall initially struggled to attract steady foot traffic; some tenants, such as the Electronics Boutique, turned to promotions like free games and prizes to meet sales targets before customer traffic increased. The themed decor remained until a 2007 renovation by Simon Property Group, part of a three-year initiative, replaced it with a modern design.

== 2021 fire ==
On September 9, 2021, a second-alarm fire broke out in the mall's food court, with flames spreading up the hood exhaust system into the roof. The Austin Fire Department extinguished the blaze with no injuries reported. A smaller, unrelated fire had previously damaged the mall's Serrano's Tex-Mex restaurant in August 2016, caused by an electrical short in its outdoor lighting; no injuries were reported.

== In popular culture ==
Lakeline Mall was featured in the 2002 movie The New Guy.

== Anchor tenants ==
- Dillard's
- JCPenney
- Macy's
- AMC Theatres

== Former anchor tenants ==
- Foley's (converted to Macy's in September 2006)
- Mervyn's (closed as of February 2006)
- Sears (closed as of September 2018; now vacant)
- Dillard's Men & Children (converted from former Mervyn's space in 2006; now vacant)

== Gallery ==
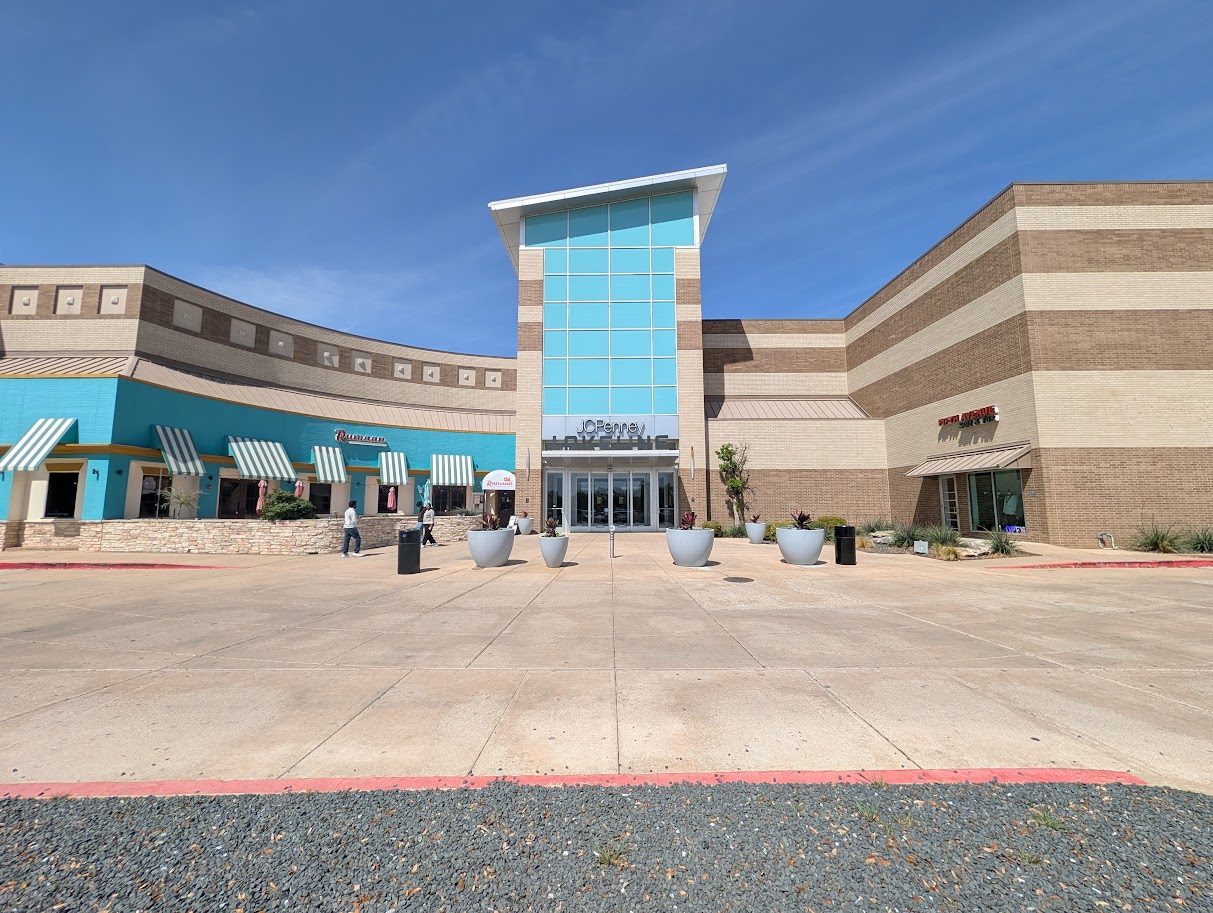
Main East Entrance

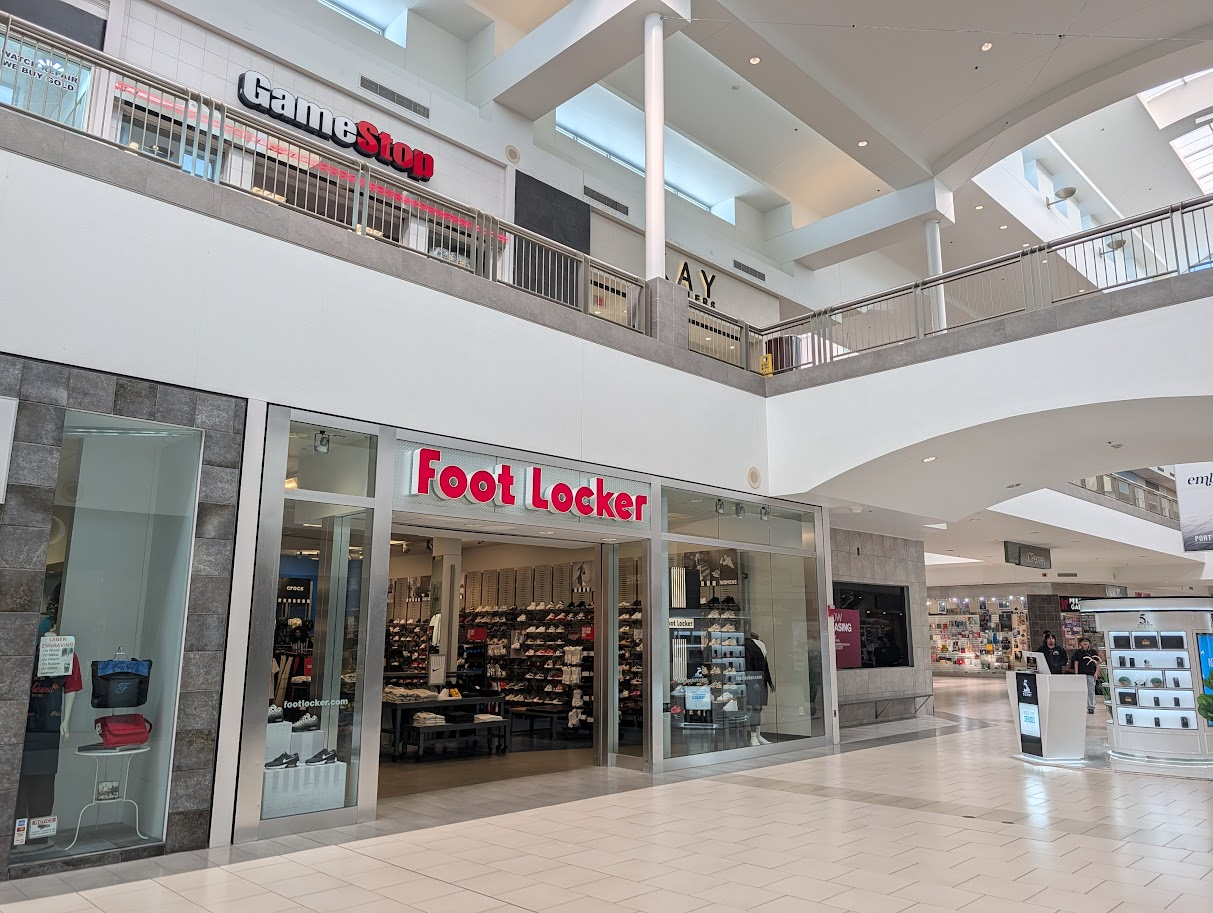
The main interior concourse

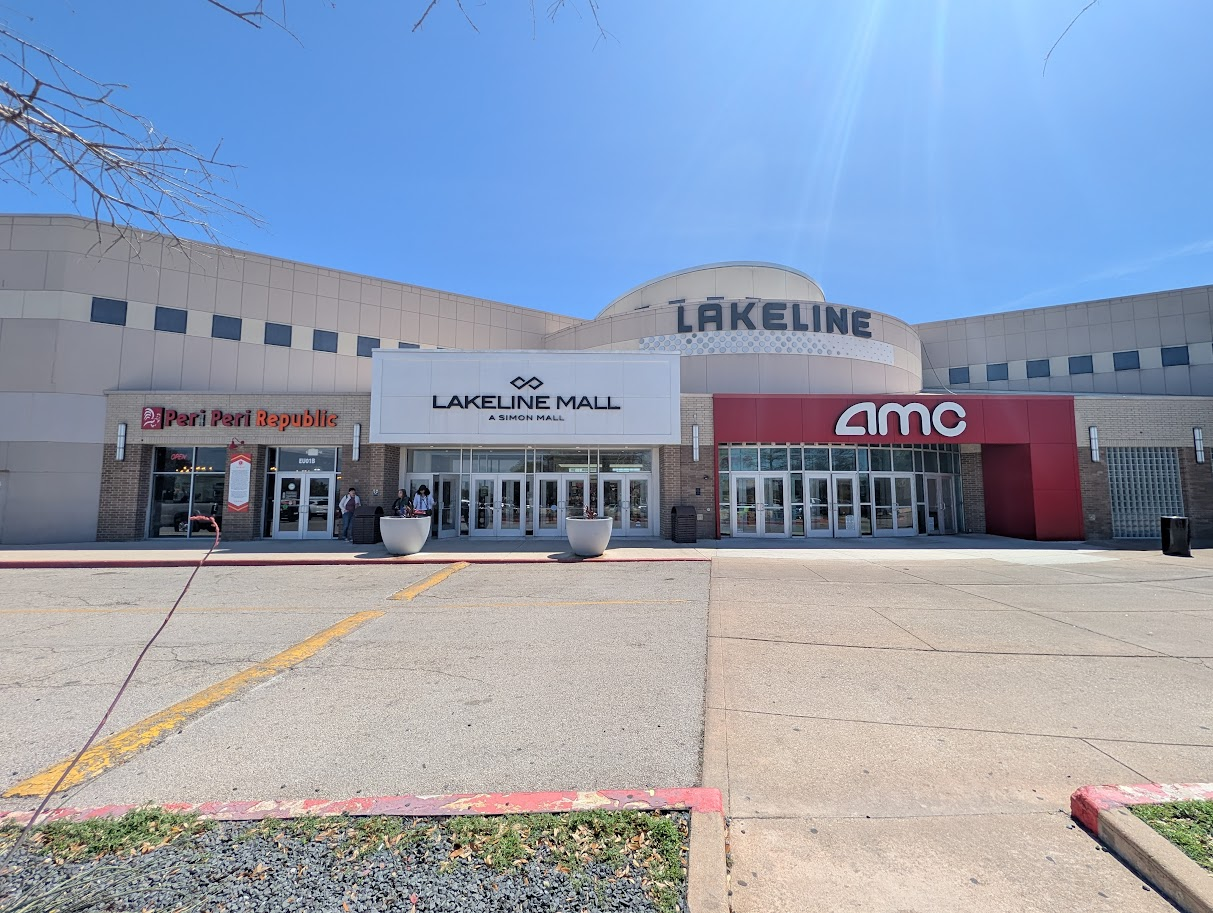
Food Court entrance

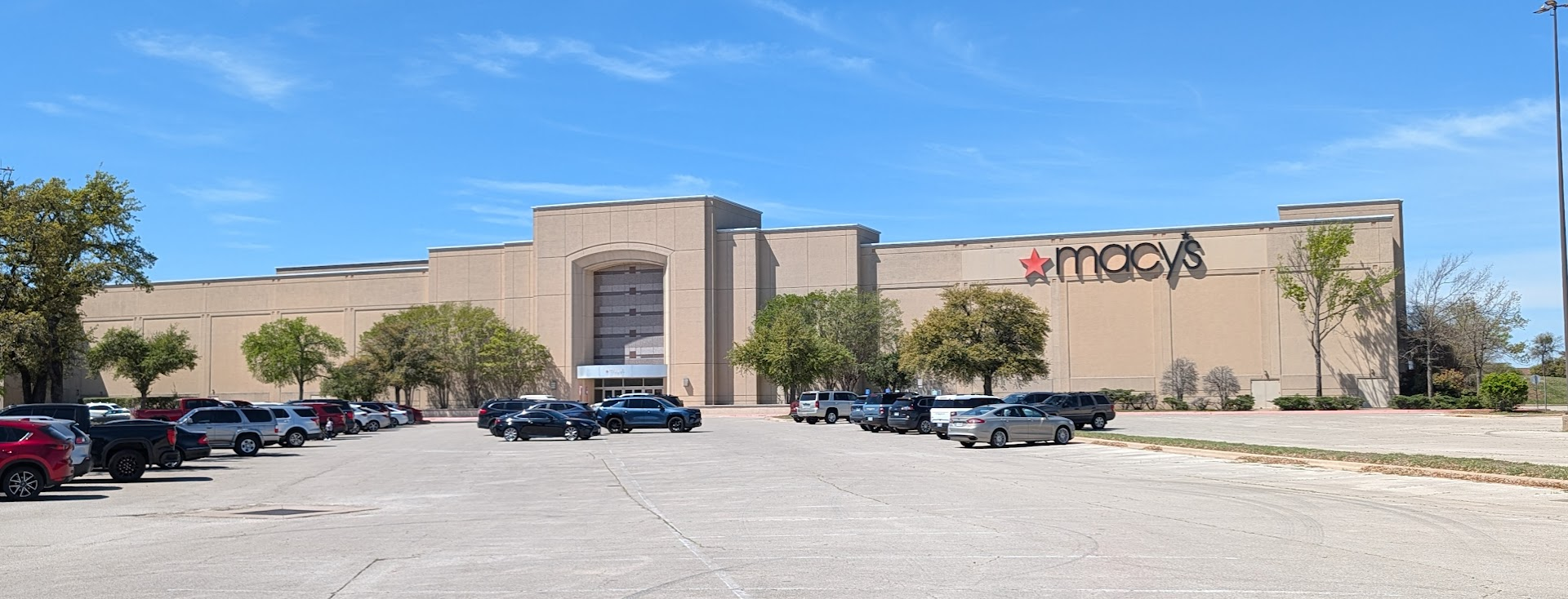
Macy's exterior

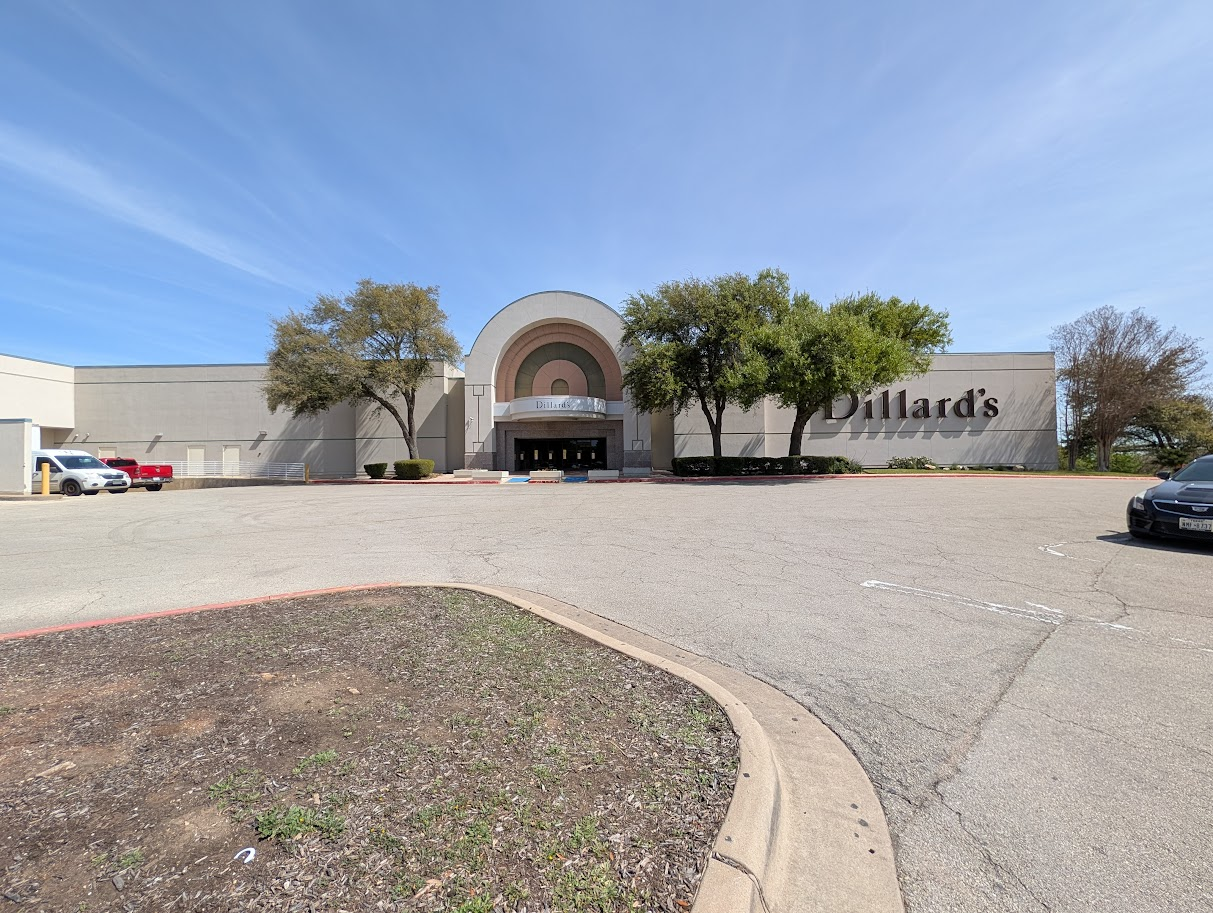
Dillard's exterior

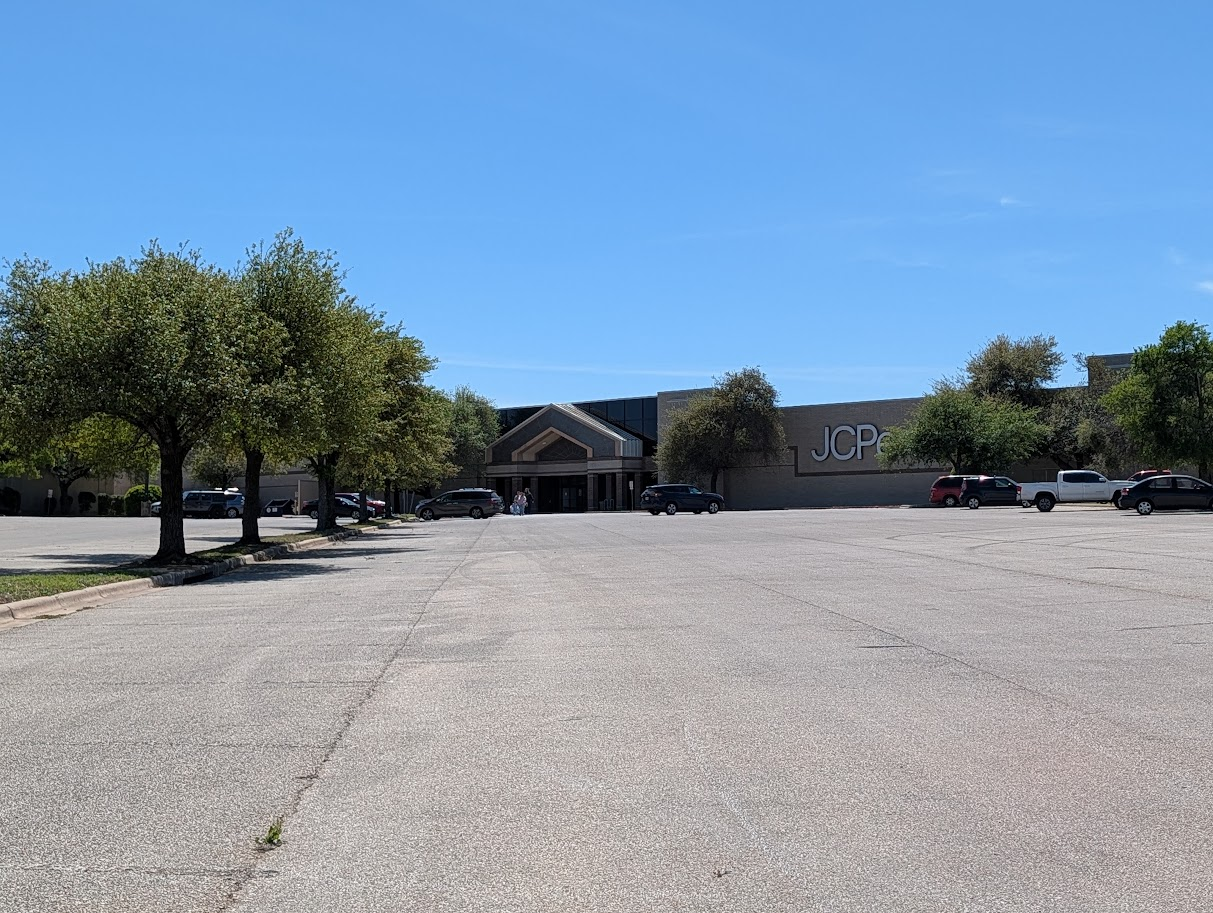
JCPenney exterior

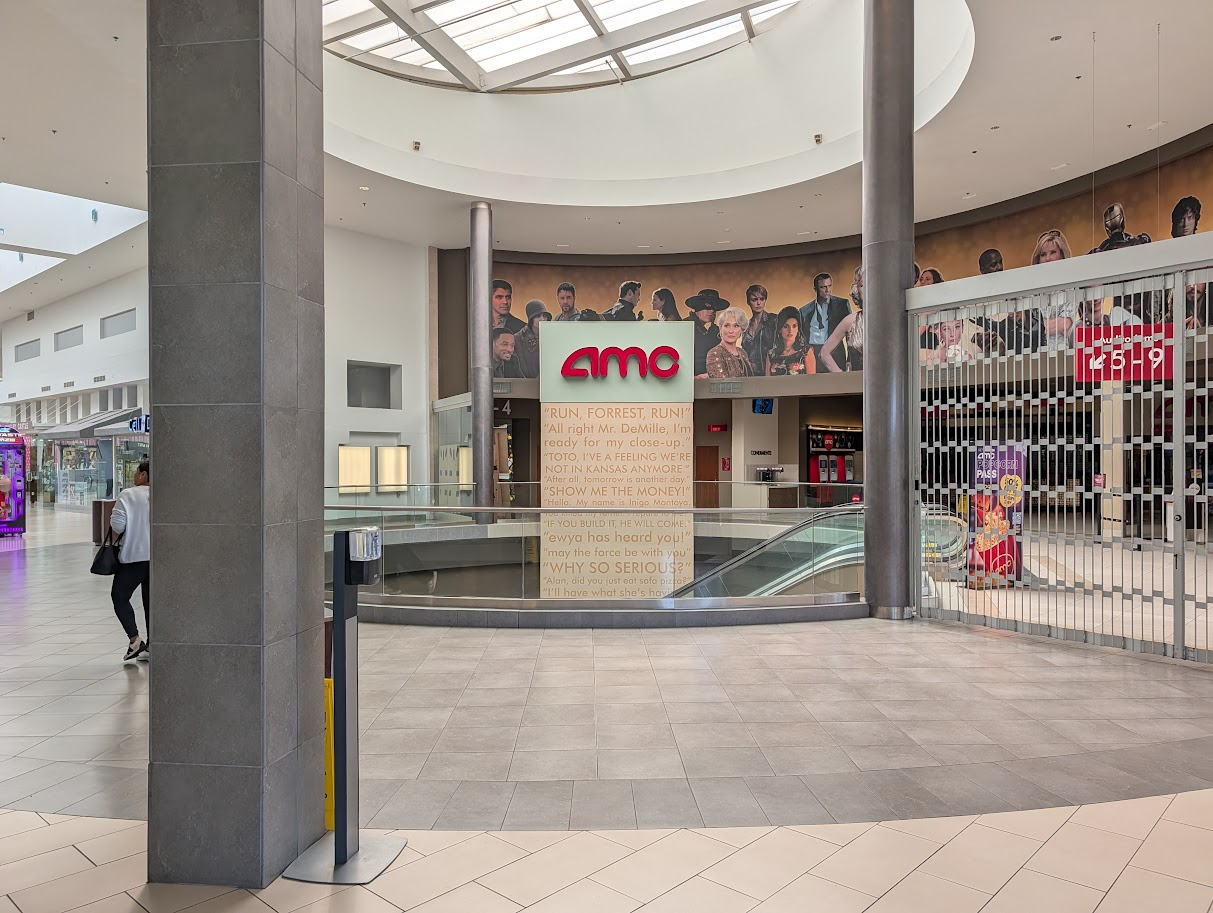
AMC Theatre entrance
