= Sidewalks (Story of the Year song) =

Single by Story of the Year

from the album Page Avenue
- Released: October 5, 2004
- Recorded: 2003
- Length: 3:34
- Label: Maverick
- Songwriters: Dan Marsala; Ryan Phillips; Adam Russell; Philip Sneed; Josh Wills
- Producer: John Feldmann

Story of the Year singles chronology
"Anthem of Our Dying Day" (2004)	"Sidewalks" (2004)	"We Don't Care Anymore" (2005)

Music video
- "Sidewalks" on YouTube

"Sidewalks" is the third and final single from Story of the Year's debut album, Page Avenue (2003). A music video was released for "Sidewalks"; the track was released as a single on October 5, 2004. The song peaked at No. 40 on the Billboard Modern Rock Tracks chart.

== Background ==
For "Sidewalks", rhythm guitarist Philip Sneed said the group wanted it to have a "different attitude" compared to the rest of the songs by incorporating strings and bongos. It was almost entirely written by Sneed; it talks about relationships and missing the simpler periods in life. Sneed wrote the main riff before showing it to the rest of the band, who liked it. When learning that they planned to add strings, Sneed wrote the rest of the song with strings in mind.

== Music video ==
Bassist Adam Russell and lead guitarist Ryan Phillips co-directed the video for the song, which was based on its sound than its lyrics, produced by production company Villains.

== Personnel ==
- Dan Marsala – lead vocals
- Ryan Phillips – lead guitar
- Adam Russell – bass
- Josh Wills – drums
- Philip Sneed – rhythm guitar

== Use in media ==
A cover version of "Sidewalks" is featured in the video game Donkey Konga 2. "Sidewalks" is also featured in the TV series One Tree Hill.

== Charts ==
Chart (2004)	Peak position
US Modern Rock Tracks (Billboard)	40

== Release history ==
Release dates and formats for "Sidewalks"
Region	Date	Format	Label(s)	Ref.
United States	January 25, 2005	Mainstream airplay	Maverick; Reprise	
