= Wolves (Story of the Year album) =

Studio album by Story of the Year
- Released: December 8, 2017
- Recorded: 2016–2017
- Genre: Melodic hardcore
- Length: 55:07
- Label: Self-released
- Producer: Aaron Sprinkle

Story of the Year chronology
The Constant (2010)	Wolves (2017)	Tear Me to Pieces (2023)

Singles from Wolves
- 1. "Bang Bang" Released: October 26, 2017; 2. "I Swear I'm Okay" Released: November 10, 2017; 3. "Miracle" Released: November 17, 2017

Wolves is the fifth studio album by American rock band Story of the Year. The album was released on December 8, 2017. In October 26, 2017, the band released "Bang Bang", their first single in seven years.

== Background ==
After touring constantly for close to a decade, the band took a hiatus and started families. During that time, bass guitarist Adam Russell and the ensemble part ways with Philip Sneed taking over on bass. In March 2018, Sneed announced his departure, along with the return of Russell to the band. The group funded their album via PledgeMusic.

== Composition ==
Lead vocalist Dan Marsala states that "Bang Bang" "encompasses the message of the album at large – the idea of the wolves closing in and time running out". The singer goes on to say that "Wolves is a metaphor for time slipping away; how it’s like a pack of wolves closing in".

== Track listing ==
Standard edition
No.	Title	Length
1.	"Wolves" (instrumental)	0:52
2.	"How Can We Go On"	3:25
3.	"Bang Bang"	3:43
4.	"Youth" (instrumental)	0:51
5.	"I Swear I'm Okay"	4:20
6.	"Miracle"	3:51
7.	"Can Anybody Hear Me"	4:28
8.	"A Part of Me"	4:01
9.	"Give Up My Heart"	5:16
10.	"The Eternal Battle for Mike Cronin's Soul (To Be Alive Again)"	4:02
11.	"My Home"	4:33
12.	"Goodnight, My Love"	4:07
13.	"Like Ghosts"	4:11
14.	"Praying for Rain"	7:27
Total length:		55:07

PledgeMusic exclusive bonus track
No.	Title	Length
15.	"Bang Bang" (alternate version) (additional downloadable track)	3:56
Total length:		59:03

== Personnel ==
Story of the Year

- Dan Marsala – lead vocals
- Ryan Phillips – guitars
- Philip Sneed – bass guitar, vocals
- Josh Wills – drums, percussion

== Charts ==
Chart (2017)	Peak position
US Independent Albums (Billboard)	9
US Top Current Album Sales (Billboard)	78
