= Anthem of Our Dying Day =

Single by Story of the Year

from the album Page Avenue
- Released: April 13, 2004
- Recorded: 2003
- Genre: Post-hardcore
- Length: 3:40
- Label: Maverick; Reprise
- Songwriters: Dan Marsala; Ryan Phillips; Adam Russell; Philip Sneed; Josh Wills
- Producer: John Feldmann

Story of the Year singles chronology
"Until the Day I Die" (2003)	"Anthem of Our Dying Day" (2004)	"Sidewalks" (2004)

Music video
- "Anthem of Our Dying Day" on YouTube

"Anthem of Our Dying Day" is the second single from Story of the Year's debut album, Page Avenue (2003). "Anthem of Our Dying Day" was released to radio on April 13, 2004; followed by a music video on April 28. The song reached number 10 on the Modern Rock Tracks.

== Background ==
Drummer Josh Wills wrote the first verse of "Anthem of Our Dying Day", before jamming out the rest of it with the band. Working on the lyrics, bassist Adam Russell had Saves the Day and Glassjaw in mind; rhythm guitarist Philip Sneed said the track was about ghosts.

== Track listing ==
No.	Title	Length
1.	"Anthem of Our Dying Day"	3:40
2.	"The Heart of Polka Is Still Beating"	3:45
3.	"Sidewalks" (alternate version)	3:34

== Music video ==
In early 2004, the group supported Linkin Park on their US arena tour. During the tour, the band learned Joe Hahn, the DJ of Linkin Park had directed their music videos, which they really liked. After talking to their management, the band befriended Hahn, who subsequently directed a music video for "Anthem of Our Dying Day".

Story of the Year frontman Dan Marsala revealed that the band was originally offered the lead spot on the Spider-Man 2 soundtrack with "Anthem of Our Dying Day". The band ultimately turned it down because the studio wanted them to edit the music video to include footage from the film. Marsala admitted they were "scared of the craziness" and worried that fans would make fun of them for the commercial tie-in. Because they passed on the opportunity, the slot went to Dashboard Confessional for the song "Vindicated", which became a massive commercial success.

== Personnel ==
- Dan Marsala – lead vocals
- Ryan Phillips – lead guitar
- Adam Russell – bass
- Josh Wills – drums
- Philip Sneed – rhythm guitar (music video)
- Greg Haupt – rhythm guitar (recording)

== Charts ==
=== Weekly charts ===
Weekly chart performance for "Anthem of Our Dying Day"
Chart (2004)	Peak position
US Alternative Airplay (Billboard)	10

=== Year-end charts ===
Year-end chart performance for "Anthem of Our Dying Day"
Chart (2004)	Position
US Modern Rock Tracks (Billboard)	45
