= A.R.S.O.N. =

Studio album by Story of the Year
- Released: February 13, 2026
- Length: 34:32
- Label: SharpTone
- Producers: Colin Brittain; Kevin McCombs

Story of the Year chronology
Tear Me to Pieces (2023)	A.R.S.O.N. (2026)

Singles from A.R.S.O.N.
- 1. "Gasoline (All Rage Still Only Numb)" Released: October 16, 2025; 2. "Disconnected" Released: January 14, 2026

Professional ratings
Review scores
Source	Rating
Kerrang!	4/5
New Noise Magazine	5/5 stars

A.R.S.O.N. (initialism for All Rage Still Only Numb) is the seventh studio album by American rock band Story of the Year. The album was released on February 13, 2026 through SharpTone Records.

== Track listing ==
All tracks are written by Dan Marsala, Ryan Phillips, Adam Russell, Josh Wills, and Colin Brittain, with additional songwriters listed.

No.	Title	Writer(s)	Length
1.	"Gasoline (All Rage Still Only Numb)"	Dan Book	2:59
2.	"Disconnected"	Elijah Noll	3:14
3.	"See Through"	James Fauntleroy; Dominique Sanders	2:38
4.	"Fall Away" (featuring Jacoby Shaddix of Papa Roach)		2:56
5.	"3 am"	John Hall	3:13
6.	"Into the Dark"	Book	3:27
7.	"My Religion"	Book	3:08
8.	"Halos"	Kevin McCombs	3:12
9.	"Good for Me / Feel So Bad"	Book	2:55
10.	"Better Than High"		3:23
11.	"I Don't Wanna Feel Like This Anymore"	McCombs; Noll	3:27
Total length:			34:32

== Personnel ==
=== Story of the Year ===
- Dan Marsala – vocals
- Ryan Phillips – guitars
- Adam Russell – bass
- Josh Wills – drums

=== Technical personnel ===
- Colin Brittain – producer
- Kevin McCombs – producer, mixing, engineer
- Dan Book – co-producer (tracks 1, 6–9)
- Vincent Ernst – co-producer (tracks 1, 6–11)
- Jonathan Gering – co-producer (tracks 2–4)
- Dominique Sanders – co-producer (track 3)
- Randy Slaugh – co-producer (track 5)
- Alex Cutler – engineer
- Marcus Wallinder – cover, artwork, layout

== Charts ==
Chart (2026)	Peak position
UK Album Downloads (Official Charts)	63
