= The New Guy =

2002 teen comedy film directed by Ed Decter

- Theatrical release poster
- Directed by: Ed Decter
- Written by: David Kendall
- Produced by: Todd Garner; Gordon Gray; Mark Ciardi
- Starring: DJ Qualls; Eliza Dushku; Zooey Deschanel; Lyle Lovett; Eddie Griffin
- Cinematography: Michael D. O'Shea
- Edited by: David Rennie
- Music by: Ralph Sall
- Production companies: Columbia Pictures; Revolution Studios; Frontier Pictures; Bedlam Pictures
- Distributed by: Sony Pictures Releasing
- Release date: May 10, 2002
- Running time: 88 minutes
- Country: United States
- Language: English
- Budget: $13 million
- Box office: $31.1 million

The New Guy is a 2002 American teen comedy film directed by Ed Decter, written by David Kendall and starring DJ Qualls, Eliza Dushku, Zooey Deschanel, Lyle Lovett, and Eddie Griffin. The film tells the story of a scrawny high schooler named Dizzy Harrison (Qualls) gets himself expelled to reinvent his identity at a new school. With advice from a prison inmate (Griffin), he transforms into the "cool" Gil Harris, winning over the school and dating the head cheerleader (Dushku). The New Guy was released by Sony Pictures Releasing on May 10, 2002. The film received generally negative reviews, but was a modest box office success.

== Plot ==
Prison inmate Luther speaks directly to the camera in the opening, telling the story of Dizzy Gillespie Harrison, an 18-year-old nerdy high school senior in Austin, Texas. Dizzy is friends with Nora, Kirk, and Glen, who together started a funk rock band called "Suburban Funk" and are addicted to video games. After the school librarian accidentally gives him a penile fracture, Dizzy becomes despondent. He acts recklessly and is temporarily sent to prison, where he meets Luther. He then resolves to get himself expelled from his high school so that he can attend a new one and attain a better social status there. After numerous attempts, he is successfully expelled from his high school, Rocky Creek.

He enrolls at East Highland High and head cheerleader Danielle welcomes the newcomer to school. Her friend Courtney invites Dizzy to a party and through a mishap, he gives her the impression that he has blown her off. Using a photo given to him by the prison inmates and help from his old friends, Dizzy manages to escape the party with his reputation intact. Upon returning home, however, he finds his father has sold their house and quit work to supervise him, which results in them living in a trailer.

Danielle asks Dizzy to encourage the school to go to see the football team play; he, referencing General Patton and Braveheart, gives an impassioned speech to the downtrodden team, inspiring them to win their first game in years. He is soon enlisted by the coach and principal to plan the school's homecoming dance, and becomes imbued with school spirit, shedding his bad boy image. Danielle breaks up with Conner and starts a relationship with Dizzy.

However, Dizzy and Gil are fast becoming too big for one body. When Nora berates Dizzy for becoming the same person he once hated, he uses his newfound popularity to confront Conner. Dizzy and Danielle spur the students to reunite, and the lines dividing the different cliques are broken.

After Rocky Creek's loss to East Highland, Barclay, Rocky Creek's running back and one of Dizzy's former tormentors, slowly starts realizing who Gil is, as East Highland High celebrates their victory. At school the next day, while East Highland still celebrates, Barclay confronts and attempts to fight Dizzy, but before he can do anything, he is attacked by the entire student body. After the attack, Conner helps Barclay up from the ground, telling him he wants to know what he knows about Dizzy.

The homecoming dance, which Dizzy's funk band is supposed to play, is crashed by the students of Rocky Creek. Barclay and Conner, who have joined forces to set a trap for Dizzy, play an embarrassing video of the librarian incident. However, Luther and the other inmates arrive to save Dizzy, tying up the two bullies. Nora admits longstanding feelings for Glen, and Danielle reveals to Dizzy that she was also not popular while growing up and ditched her old friends once she gained popularity later on due to desperately wanting to fit in. She forgives him for hiding who he was, and they kiss.

Luther ends the film, and the man he is talking to is revealed to be David Hasselhoff. In a mid-credits scene, Dizzy and Danielle mount a horse and ride off into the sunset together. However, Danielle falls off the horse and Dizzy rides away.

== Cast ==
- DJ Qualls as Dizzy Gillespie Harrison / Gil Harris
- Eliza Dushku as Danielle
- Eddie Griffin as Luther
- Zooey Deschanel as Nora
- Lyle Lovett as Bear Harrison
- Jerod Mixon as Kirk
- Parry Shen as Glen
- Rachael E. Stevens as Tina
- Ameer Baraka as Barclay
- Kina Cosper as Estelle
- Ross Patterson as Conner Maguire
- Geoffrey Lewis as Principal Zaylor
- Kurt Fuller as Mr. Undine
- Sunny Mabrey as Courtney
- Illeana Douglas as Miss Kiki Pierce
- Justine Johnston as Mrs. Whitman
- Matt Gogin as Ed Ligget
- Julius Carry as Coach
- Christa Campbell as Tommy Lee's Girlfriend (uncredited)

Cameo appearances

- Jerry O'Connell
- Charlie O'Connell
- Vanilla Ice
- Tony Hawk
- Ethan Embry
- Silkk the Shocker
- David Hasselhoff
- Master P
- Tommy Lee
- Kool Mo Dee
- Horatio Sanz
- Henry Rollins
- Josh Todd
- Jai Rodriguez
- C-Murder
- Jermaine D. Mauldin
- M. C. Gainey
- Kyle Gass
- Gene Simmons
- James Brown (archival footage)
- Valente Rodriguez

== Production ==
In March 2000, it was reported that Walt Disney Studios had greenlit The New Guy, based on an idea by producer Todd Garner and written by David Kendall centering on a high school senior who in an effort to shake his uncool image gets himself expelled and set up at a new school only for his plan to become threatened with the arrival of his nemesis from his old school. Ed Decter was slated to make his directorial debut on the film. Following Garner's departure from Disney, Garner took The New Guy with him and established it at Revolution Studios. DJ Qualls was slated to star as the lead character while Eddie Griffin was in negotiations to play as the con who assists Qualls' character in his lies.

The film was shot in Austin and around Austin (San Marcos, Elgin, and Del Valle) used Texas State University, Driskell Hotel, and an FYE at Lakeline Mall between October 23, 2000, to January 12, 2001.

== Unrated version ==
In the 92-minute unrated cut, Dizzy appears to be a "child of divorce." He once had a mother named Beth Anne but she left the family while Dizzy was doing his "godfather of soul" routine. Miss Kiki Pierce talks about Dizzy's excessive masturbation and becomes his stepmother in the uncensored version (unlike the PG-13 version).

According to the storyline in the uncensored version, Gil Harris had apparently murdered a guy in Rhode Island before being sent off to prison while no back story was made for the name in the theatrical version.

== Reception ==
Rotten Tomatoes gives the film a score of 7% based on 98 reviews, with an average rating of 3.30/10. The consensus reads: "Incoherent, silly, and unoriginal, The New Guy offers up the same old teen gross-out comedy cliches." Metacritic, which uses a weighted average, assigned the film a score of 24 out of 100, based on 23 critics, indicating "generally unfavorable" reviews.

The film grossed $31,167,388 worldwide against a $13 million production budget.

== Soundtrack ==
The soundtrack for the film was released on April 23, 2002, by Epic Records and Sony Music Soundtrax.

1. "The New Guy" by Mystikal
2. "I'm Just a Kid" by Simple Plan
3. "You Really Got Me" by Eve 6
4. "Keep the Party Goin'" by Juvenile
5. "So Fresh, So Clean" by OutKast
6. "Outsider" by Green Day
7. "Uh Huh" by B2K
8. "So Dizzy" by Rehab
9. "Breakout" by OPM
10. "Dark Side" by Wheatus
11. "I Love You" by Nine Days
12. "Heart in Hand" by Vertical Horizon
13. "Hi-Lo" by JT Money
14. "Let It Whip" by SR-71

Songs that were featured in the film but do not appear on the soundtrack include:

- "Super Bad" by James Brown
- "Action Figure Party" by Action Figure Party
- "(Rock) Superstar" by Cypress Hill
- "Click Click Boom" by Saliva
- "Boléro" by Hungarian State Orchestra
- "The Good, the Bad and the Ugly" by Ennio Morricone
- "In the Air Tonight" by Phil Collins
- "Also sprach Zarathustra" by Interstellar Force
- "Dammit, I Changed Again" by The Offspring
- "Bounce" by Glo & Eklips
- "She's a Bad Mama Jama (She's Built, She's Stacked)" by Carl Carlton
- "The Battle Hymn of the Republic" by St. John's Cathedral Choirs and Festival Orchestra
- "Lookin' for Love" by Johnny Lee
- "Girl All the Bad Guys Want" by Bowling for Soup
- "New Religion Every Day" by American Steel
- "Soar" by All Too Much
- "The New You" by Laptop
- "The Anthem" by Good Charlotte
- "Wannabe Gangster” by Wheatus
