= The Black Swan (Story of the Year album) =

Studio album by Story of the Year
- Released: April 22, 2008
- Recorded: October–December 2007
- Studio: Barbarosa, Bavonm, Virginia; Foxy
- Genre: Post-hardcore; alternative rock; alternative metal
- Length: 49:04
- Label: Epitaph
- Producer: Michael Baskette; John Feldmann

Story of the Year chronology
In the Wake of Determination (2005)	The Black Swan (2008)	The Constant (2010)

Singles from The Black Swan
- 1. "Wake Up" Released: February 19, 2008; 2. "Message to the World" Released: July 1, 2008 (radio airplay); 3. "The Antidote" Released: December 6, 2008; 4. "Terrified" Released: June 30, 2009

The Black Swan is the third studio album by American rock band Story of the Year. The album was released on April 22, 2008.

== Background and recording ==
Story of the Year's second album In the Wake of Determination was released in October 2005 through major label Maverick Records. By July 2006, the band had accumulated nine-and-a-half new tracks for their next album. They spent the following five months working on a live DVD until February 2007, when work began on a new album in earnest. During this time, Maverick Records folded and was incorporated into another major label, who opted to drop the band from their contract.

On October 29, 2007, it was announced that the band had signed to independent label Epitaph Records. In addition, it was mentioned that the band were in the studio with producer John Feldmann, aiming to release their next album in spring 2008. The band explained the switch to an independent: "If a band doesn't have a mega bubble–gum shiny pop hit, chances are the label will not even put the record out, much less push it. To [us], it just doesn't seem like a very cool environment to be in". The sessions with Feldmann at Foxy Studios resulted in "Wake Up", "Tell Me (P.A.C.)", "Message to the World", and "Terrified"; Matt Appleton and Kyle Moorman served as engineers. Michael Baskette, who produced the remaining songs, aided with the group's drum sound, knowing when to make a certain hit sound harder. Sessions with Baskette occurred at Studio Barbarosa in Bavon, Virginia. Dave Holdredge acted as his engineer, while Jeff Moll did digital editing. Recording was reportedly finished by the end of December. Chris Lord-Alge mixed "Wake Up", while the remaining songs were mixed by Baskette and Holdredge at Barbarosa; Ted Jensen mastered the album at Sterling Sound.

== Composition ==
Marsala said it had the heavy tone of Determination and the melodic/poppy nature of Page Avenue, drawing comparisons to Underoath, Alexisonfire and BoySetsFire. The album was named after Nassim Nicholas Taleb's book, The Black Swan: The Impact of the Highly Improbable, on unpredictable events and randomness. One theme found in a few of the songs ("Wake Up", "Terrified", and in particular "Pale Blue Dot (Interlude)") is the concept that human existence is insignificant in comparison to the universe as a whole, and that wars, fighting and killing seem pointless.

Opener "Choose Your Fate" is an anti-George W. Bush track that is reminiscent of Atreyu with its breakdowns and melodic-screamo bridge section. It was similar in style to the band's "Divide and Conquer" (from Page Avenue) and "March of the Dead" (from Determination). "Angel in the Swamp" takes influence from the Movielife, touching on pop punk, and concluding with Queens of the Stone Age-esque guitar work. Marsala wrote it in response to a message he received on Myspace. The sender relayed that she had been in an abusive household and was having problems; she mentioned that the only thing that was helping her was the group's music.

"We're Not Gonna Make It" talks about a couple in a biracial-relationship; its chorus recalled the Page Avenue single "Anthem of Our Dying Day". The piano ballad "Terrified" is a lo-fi track that channels Funeral for a Friend, specifically their song "History". The track "Pale Blue Dot (Interlude)" was inspired by the famous photograph of the same name and features an excerpt from astronomer Carl Sagan's book Pale Blue Dot: A Vision of the Human Future in Space read by its author. "Welcome to Our New War" was compared to Bullet for My Valentine.

== Release ==
On January 26, 2008, The Black Swan was announced for release in April, and "Wake Up" was made available for streaming. The album's artwork and track listing were revealed two days later. "Wake Up" was released to radio on February 19. On April 2, the music video for it premiered on MTV; it sees the band performing in an abandoned warehouse while people use spray-paint around them. In early April, the band appeared at the Bamboozle Left festival. The Black Swan was made available for streaming on April 15, 2008, before being released on April 22. Between June and August, the band performed on the 2008 Warped Tour. "Message to the World" was released to radio on July 1. The group toured as part of the 2008 Taste of Chaos European tour in October. The band performed at the Musink Festival in February 2009. A music video was released for "Terrified" on July 1, 2009; it trails a soldier in Iraq as his wife and daughter await his return home. Clips of the soldier are intermixed with video diary-style footage of his family.

== Reception ==
Professional ratings
Review scores
Source	Rating
AbsolutePunk	71%
AllMusic	3.5/5 stars
Alternative Press	3/5
Gigwise	8/10 stars
Las Vegas Review-Journal	A
Melodic	4.5/5 stars
Metal.de	8/10
Rock Hard	8/10

The Black Swan was received favorable reviews from critics, many of whom praised the songwriting. AbsolutePunk staff member Drew Beringer felt that the album "re-energized the band" as it was packed with 13 songs that are "set to rock your balls off", creating the best material they could offer. Alternative Press writer Luke O'Neil remarked that people who enjoyed their debut "may be surprised at the consistently hard-edged power throughout" The Black Swan, as the band "still display a canny ear for pop at times". The staff at Chart Attack, who were not impressed with their second album, said that it "may be safe to say that SOTY are sounding more like their old selves again. They highlighted "Wake Up" and "Tell Me (P.A.C.)" as examples of the band "recaptur[ing] the catchiness of their songs, instead of just focusing on loud guitars and screaming". Melodic writer Henrik Holmgren remarked that the "first thing I notice is the sound, it almost shoots out of my speakers", going on to praise the musicianship and state that it was on par with their debut.

Rock Hard reviewer Marcus Schleutermann wrote that the guitar riffs, "which are quite cool in themselves, the screams and the uptempo passages are so 'skillfully' integrated in terms of production that they don't really hurt". Cleveland Scene's Michael Gallucci thought that it "drives home each and every point with ear-piercing screams, amp-shredding riffs, and world-in-crisis lyrics". The staff at Las Vegas Review-Journal commented that while it had its drawbacks, "such as a sound that’s almost too consistent between tracks as well as few lyrics that are automatically memorable; but fortunately, the songs are extremely tight". Luisa Mateus of Gigwise posed the question: "Can you imagine taking all the bits of your exes that you like and combining them to make one hunk of a man? That’s pretty much what you get from this CD". Metal.de writer Heiko Eschenbach said that "musically it doesn't offer any major changes, but in the end it's far more than just solid". AllMusic reviewer Corey Apar wrote that although they seem "self-assured [...] all it really means is, well, The Black Swan is another Story of the Year album", mentioning that it would not convert any non-fans.

It debuted on the UK rock charts at number 6 and at number 18 on the US Billboard 200 chart, selling about 21,000 copies in its first week. It is the band's highest charting release to date.

== Track listing ==
All songs written by Story of the Year.

No.	Title	Producer	Length
1.	"Choose Your Fate"	Michael Baskette	3:34
2.	"Wake Up"	John Feldmann	3:32
3.	"The Antidote"	Baskette	4:00
4.	"Tell Me (P.A.C.)"	Feldmann	3:59
5.	"Angel in the Swamp"	Baskette	4:29
6.	"The Black Swan"	Baskette	3:45
7.	"Message to the World"	Feldmann	4:04
8.	"Apathy Is a Deathwish"	Baskette	3:31
9.	"We're Not Gonna Make It"	Baskette	4:03
10.	"Cannonball"	Baskette	3:50
11.	"Terrified"	Feldmann	4:00
12.	"Pale Blue Dot (Interlude)"	Baskette	1:06
13.	"Welcome to Our New War"	Baskette	5:11
Total length:			49:04

International bonus track
No.	Title	Length
14.	"Never Let It Go"	3:42

iTunes bonus tracks
No.	Title	Length
14.	"The Truth Shall Set Me Free"	4:00
15.	"Never Let It Go" (pre-order only)	3:42

Additional b-sides
No.	Title	Length
1.	"The Virus" (from "The Antidote" single)	3:51
2.	"Turn Up the Radio" (from "Terrified" single)	3:52
3.	"Save One" (from "Wake Up" single)	4:09

== Personnel ==
Personnel per booklet.

Story of the Year

- Dan Marsala – lead vocals
- Ryan Phillips – guitar
- Philip Sneed – guitar, backing vocals
- Adam Russell – bass guitar
- Josh Wills – drums

Additional musicians

- John Feldmann – additional string arrangements, percussion, keys, vocals
- Matt Appleton – additional keys, vocals
- Julian Feldmann – additional vocals (track 11)

Production

- Michael Baskette – producer (all except tracks 2, 4, 7 and 11), mixing (all except track 2)
- Dave Holdredge – mixing (all except track 2), engineer (all except tracks 2, 4, 7 and 11)
- Jef Moll – digital editing
- John Feldmann – producer (tracks 2, 4, 7 and 11), recording (tracks 2, 4, 7 and 11)
- Matt Appleton – engineer (tracks 2, 4, 7 and 11)
- Kyle Moorman – engineer (tracks 2, 4, 7 and 11)
- Chris Lord-Alge – mixing (track 2)
- Ted Jensen – mastering
- Studio One – swan logo
- Bryan Sheffield – band photography

== Release history ==
Country	Release date	Format
Worldwide	April 19, 2008	Regular download
Worldwide	April 22, 2008	Regular Compact Disc

== Charts ==
Chart performance for The Black Swan
Chart (2008)	Peak position
Australian Albums (ARIA)	25
UK Independent Albums (Official Charts)	8
UK Rock & Metal Albums (Official Charts)	6
US Billboard 200	18
US Independent Albums (Billboard)	3
