= The Constant (Story of the Year album) =

Studio album by Story of the Year
- Released: February 16, 2010
- Recorded: May 2009
- Studios: Barbarosa, Bavon, Virginia
- Genres: Post-hardcore; alternative rock; alternative metal
- Length: 41:42
- Label: Epitaph
- Producer: Michael "Elvis" Baskette

Story of the Year chronology
The Black Swan (2008)	The Constant (2010)	Wolves (2017)

Singles from The Constant
- 1. "To the Burial" Released: December 7, 2009; 2. "I'm Alive" Released: January 1, 2010; 3. "The Dream Is Over" Released: August 9, 2010

The Constant is the fourth studio album by American rock band Story of the Year. It was released on February 16, 2010, through Epitaph Records and, like the band's previous record, was produced by Michael "Elvis" Baskette who has also produced albums by Alter Bridge, Chevelle, Escape the Fate, blessthefall, Fact, and A Change of Pace. This was the last studio album to feature bassist Adam Russell who left the band in 2014. Russell would rejoin the band in 2018.

== Background and recording ==
In May 2009, guitarist Ryan Phillips revealed that the band were in the writing process for their next album.

The Constant was recorded at Studio Barbarosa in Bavon, Virginia, with producer Michael Baskette and engineer Dave Holdredge. Jef Mall did digital editing, while Casey White acted as studio assistant. Baskette and Holdredge mixed the recordings, which were then mastered by Ted Jensen at Sterling Sound.

== Composition ==
Frontman Dan Marsala explained that the album title symbolizes the band's work ethic and commitment to both themselves and their fans. "Music is the constant thing in life for us," he said. "When I go to bed I think about music and when I wake up it's the first thing on my mind. The Constant can mean anything; hopefully our band will go on forever and we want music to remain a constant thing in our lives no matter what."

== Release ==
In November and December 2009, the band went on a US tour with the Devil Wears Prada, All That Remains and Haste the Day. "To the Burial" was posted on the band's Myspace profile on December 7, 2009. On December 10, Russell and Phillips premiered "I'm Alive" from the album on the Point radio station. The band released "I'm Alive" as a single on January 1, 2010. On January 6, 2010, The Constant was announced for release the following month; alongside this, its artwork and track listing were posted online. "I'm Alive" was released to alternative radio on February 2. The Constant was made available for streaming on Myspace on February 10, 2010, before it was released on February 16, 2010 through Epitaph Records. It was promoted with a tour of the Southern US states in March and April 2010; the trek included an appearance at the Extreme Thing festival.

On August 9, 2010, the band announced that the third and final single off the record will be "The Dream Is Over". In late September and October 2011, the band toured Australia as part of the Soundwave Counter-Revolution festival.

== Reception ==
Professional ratings
Aggregate scores
Source	Rating
Metacritic	65/100
Review scores
Source	Rating
AbsolutePunk	73%
AllMusic	3.5/5 stars
Exclaim!	Unfavorable
Melodic	4/5 stars
Ox-Fanzine	6/10 stars
Punknews.org	2/5 stars
Rock Hard	8/10
Rock Sound	6/10 stars
Sputnikmusic	3.5/5
Ultimate Guitar	7/10

The album debuted at No. 42 on the Billboard 200 charts with sales of 14,115.

== Track listing ==
All lyrics written by Dan Marsala and Adam Russell, all music composed by Story of the Year.

No.	Title	Length
1.	"The Children Sing"	4:07
2.	"The Ghost of You and I"	3:55
3.	"I'm Alive"	4:15
4.	"To the Burial"	3:48
5.	"The Dream Is Over"	3:52
6.	"Remember a Time"	4:05
7.	"Holding On to You"	3:43
8.	"Won Threw Ate"	3:44
9.	"Ten Years Down"	3:53
10.	"Time Goes On"	4:06
11.	"Eye for an Eye"	2:14
Total length:		41:42

Japanese edition bonus track
No.	Title	Length
12.	"Your Unsung Friend"	4:19
Total length:		46:01

Digital download exclusive bonus tracks
No.	Title	Length
12.	"Your Unsung Friend"	4:19
13.	"Tonight We Fall"	3:47
Total length:		49:48

== Personnel ==
Personnel per booklet.

Story of the Year

- Dan Marsala – lead vocals
- Ryan Phillips – guitar
- Philip Sneed – guitar, vocals, keys, synthesizers
- Adam Russell – bass
- Josh Wills – drums, percussion

Additional musicians

- Dave Holdredge – strings, string arrangements
- Kalei Sneed – children's choir (track 1)
- Sydney Baskette – children's choir (track 1)
- Alexis Baskette – children's choir (track 1)
- The Bookworms – gang vocals

Production and design

- Michael "Elvis" Baskette – producer, mixing
- Dave Holdredge – mixing, engineer
- Jef Mall – digital editing
- Casey White – studio assistant
- Ted Jensen – mastering
- Nick Pirtchard – art, design, cover photo
- Tim Harman – band photo
- Josh Wills – subway photo

== Charts ==
Chart performance for The Constant
Chart (2010)	Peak position
Australian Albums (ARIA)	88
UK Independent Albums (Official Charts)	37
UK Rock & Metal Albums (Official Charts)	24
US Billboard 200	42
US Independent Albums (Billboard)	24
US Top Alternative Albums (Billboard)	4
US Top Rock Albums (Billboard)	5
