= Tear Me to Pieces =

Studio album by Story of the Year
- Released: March 10, 2023
- Recorded: 2022
- Studio: Record Room East (Nashville)
- Length: 33:08
- Label: SharpTone
- Producer: Colin Brittain; Kevin McCombs; Lachlan "Lucky" West

Story of the Year chronology
Wolves (2017)	Tear Me to Pieces (2023)	A.R.S.O.N. (2026)

Singles from Tear Me to Pieces
- 1. "Real Life" Released: August 24, 2022; 2. "Tear Me to Pieces" Released: October 12, 2022; 3. "Take the Ride" Released: November 24, 2022; 4. "War" Released: January 17, 2023; 5. "2005" Released: February 15, 2023; 6. "Afterglow" Released: March 10, 2023

Professional ratings
Review scores
Source	Rating
Kerrang!	4/5

Tear Me to Pieces is the sixth studio album by American rock band Story of the Year. The album was released on March 10, 2023 through SharpTone Records. This is their first studio album without guitarist and backing vocalist Philip Sneed and their first new music since 2010 that features bassist Adam Russell after coming back to the band in 2018.

== Release ==
With the band about to start a two–month festival and headlining tour, the first single, "Real Life", was released on August 24, 2022, along with an accompanying music video featuring Dan and his wife Jen. On October 12, the album's title track was released as the second single. The music video features the band playing in an old church with their friends and fans. On the same day, the album title, artwork, and track listing were released. A month later, the third single, "Take the Ride", was released with the music video containing footage from their When We Were Young festival performance the previous month.

On January 17, 2023, the album's fourth single, "War", was released. On February 15, the fifth single, "2005", was released. With the theme of the song reminiscing about the band's early days, the music video appropriately is made up of footage filmed of the band on and off-stage in and around 2005. On the same day, the band announced they would be supporting Yellowcard on select dates for their 20th anniversary of Ocean Avenue tour. The album was released on March 10, 2023, as well as the sixth and final single, "Afterglow".

== Track listing ==
All tracks are written by Adam Russell, Colin Brittain, Daniel Marsala, Josh Wills and Ryan Phillips, except where noted.

No.	Title	Writer(s)	Producer(s)	Length
1.	"Tear Me to Pieces"		Colin Brittain	2:56
2.	"Real Life"		Brittain	2:44
3.	"Afterglow"		Brittain	2:53
4.	"Dead and Gone"	Russell; Cameron Walker-Wright; Marsala; Wills; Lachlan West; Phillips	Brittain; Kevin McCombs; Lucky West	3:03
5.	"War"	Nick Bailey; Elisha Noll; Russell; Walker-Wright; Brittain; Marsala; Wills; West; Phillips	Brittain; West	2:54
6.	"Can't Save You"	Jordan Witzigreuter; Russell; Brittain; Marsala; Wills; West; Phillips	Brittain; West	3:29
7.	"2005"	Keith Varon; Bailey; Russell; Brittain; Marsala; Wills; Phillips	Brittain	2:51
8.	"Sorry About Me"		Brittain	3:29
9.	"Take the Ride"	Nick Furlong; Bailey; Russell; Brittain; Marsala; Wills; Phillips	Brittain	2:58
10.	"Knives Out"	Kevin Skaff; Russell; Brittain; Marsala; Wills; Phillips	Brittain; McCombs	3:04
11.	"Use Me"	Aaron Gillespie; Kyle Fishman; Bailey Russell; Brittain; Marsala; Wills; Phillips	Brittain	2:47
Total length:				33:08

== Personnel ==
Adapted from Tidal.

Story of the Year

- Dan Marsala – lead vocals
- Ryan Phillips – guitars
- Adam Russell – bass guitar
- Josh Wills – drums

Production personnel

- Produced by Colin Brittain, Kevin McCombs (4–10), Lachlan "Lucky" West (4–6)
- Additional guitars on "Knives Out" by Kevin Skaff
- Additional engineer & guitar tech – Joe Dunn
- Synths & additional production by Jonathan Gering
- Additional BG Vox by Erica Silva
- Vibe Tech – Jon Bon Lohman
- Layout & design by Mike Forester & Adam Russell
- Additional composers: Cameron Walker-Wright (4–5), Lachlan West (4–6), Nick Bailey (5–11), Elisha Noll (5), Jordan Witzigreuter (6), Keith Varon (7), Nick Furlong (9), Kevin Skaff (10), Aaron Gillespie (11), Kyle Fishman (11)

== Charts ==
Chart (2023)	Peak position
UK Album Downloads (Official Charts)	45
UK Rock & Metal Albums (Official Charts)	20
US Top Album Sales (Billboard)	24
US Top Current Album Sales (Billboard)	16
