= Page Avenue =

Studio album by Story of the Year
- Released: September 16, 2003
- Recorded: November 2002, c. March or April 2003
- Studios: Foxy, Marina del Rey, California; Avex, Waikiki
- Genres: Post-hardcore; alternative rock; pop-punk; emo; screamo
- Length: 41:49
- Label: Maverick
- Producer: John Feldmann

Story of the Year chronology
Story of the Year (2002)	Page Avenue (2003)	Live in the Lou/Bassassins (2005)

Singles from Page Avenue
- 1. "Until the Day I Die" Released: August 12, 2003; 2. "Anthem of Our Dying Day" Released: April 13, 2004; 3. "Sidewalks" Released: October 5, 2004

Page Avenue is the debut album by American rock band Story of the Year. Goldfinger frontman John Feldmann, who served as a talent scout for Maverick Records, began working on demos with the band, and eventually for their debut album. Sessions took place at Feldmann's home studio, Foxy Studios in Marina del Rey, California; the group tracked three songs before guitarist Greg Haupt left in November 2002. Guitarist Philip Sneed was drafted in and sessions recommenced in early 2003. The album's release through Maverick Records was pushed back several times to September 16, 2003.

The band toured as part of the Warped Tour before "Until the Day I Die" was released as a radio single. In early 2004, the band supported Linkin Park on their US arena tour; they subsequently worked with Linkin Park's Joe Hahn on a music video for "Anthem of Our Dying Day". The track was released as a single in April 2004, and the group embarked on a headlining US tour. A second stint on the Warped Tour followed, taking a month-long break, and headlining the Nintendo Fusion Tour. A music video was released for "Sidewalks"; the track was released as a single in October.

Critics drew comparisons between the group and Thrice, Finch, and the Used, the lattermost being another act that Feldmann had produced. Page Avenue peaked at number 51 on the Billboard 200. It was certified gold by the Recording Industry Association of America (RIAA) in April 2004, then platinum in March 2021, serving as one of the first post-hardcore albums to achieve either status. "Until the Day I Die", "Anthem of Our Dying Day" and "Sidewalks" all charted on the Alternative Songs chart, with the first two reaching the chart's top 20. "Until the Day I Die" also reached the top 75 in the UK. An acoustic version of the album was released in October 2013, which coincided with an anniversary tour.

== Background ==
Prior to the formation of Story of the Year, its members had played in local bands as early as 1995: Dan Marsala and Ryan Phillips in 67 North, Phillips and Josh Wills in Means Well, and Phillips and Adam Russell in Locash. With Marsala on drums and Phillips on guitar, the pair formed Bigbluemonkey. Soon afterwards, John Taylor and Perry West joined the band on vocals and bass, respectively. After performing in St. Louis, Missouri, and touring the Midwest, the group released two EPs: Three Days Broken in 1998 and Truth in Separation in 1999. Following high school graduation, the members were able to focus on the band. Shortly afterwards, Taylor and West left the group resulting in Marsala shifting from drums to vocals. Wills and Russell joined the group on drums and bass, respectively.

Since Means Well, Wills had been a close friend of Marsala and Phillips, following Bigbluemonkey on road trips and acting as their drum technician. Prior to joining, Russell was originally a guitarist and had no experience on bass. In February 2002, they recruited guitarist Greg Haupt, formerly of Disturbing the Peace, and released the Story of the Year EP. In May, the band performed at a local radio festival, Pointfest. The group sneaked into Goldfinger's tour bus while the band was playing and left copies of a home video that featured pranks akin to Jackass and a live show. In June, the group moved to Orange County, California, and built their own practice space. Two weeks later, they were contacted by Goldfinger's manager John Reese, who informed them the band wanted to take them on tour.

Partway through the tour, Goldfinger frontman John Feldmann said that he wanted to produce their demos to try to attract a record deal. They did pre-production acoustically, and tracked demos of "Until the Day I Die" and "Anthem of Our Dying Day" in the process. Following the tour's conclusion, Feldmann showed the home video to major label Maverick Records, for whom he acted as a talent scout. In September, the group changed their name from Bigbluemonkey to Story of the Year at the urging of Feldmann, who disliked the name. At the time, they claimed they had discovered that a blues group named Big Blue Monkey already existed. Later, on their podcast Page Avenue Crew, they clarified that they just did not care for the name and had just made up the excuse of another band having the same name. In October, the band signed to Maverick Records following a showcase. In the process, Reese became their manager.

== Writing and recording ==
Prior to signing with Maverick, the group wanted to improve their song writing. As Marsala explains: "[W]e had songs, but we knew we wanted new stuff and we wanted to like really get serious." After signing, the band began working on material for their debut album, writing for roughly a month at Feldmann's house. Feldmann helped the group structure their songs better. Recording took place at Feldmann's home studio, Foxy Studios in Marina del Rey, California. The studio space consisted of one bedroom, which featured drums. Feldmann had stapled egg crates and glued foam to the walls to give the room better sound. He acted as producer and engineer with additional engineering by Mark Blewett. In November 2002, the group tracked "Anthem of Our Dying Day", "Until the Day I Die" and "Razorblades", which were the only songs they had at the time. However, before they planned to return to the studio, Haupt left the group over creative and personal reasons. The band spent the following seven weeks writing more music and searching for a new guitarist. They heard that guitarist Philip Sneed was on uncertain terms with his band Maybe Today.

Sneed joined the group after flying out to California and practicing with the band. Accumulating 25–30 songs, the band returned to the studio in March or April 2003. They narrowed the choice of songs to ten after a week or two, and spent the following six weeks recording them. Sessions took place seven days a week, up to 15 hours per day. Feldmann informed Maverick that they should record in Hawaii. They subsequently recorded at Avex Studios in Waikiki, Hawaii, tracking strings for two songs. The group said they "spent 6 days in the sun and like 7 hours actually working." During the recording of "Falling Down", Wills was unable to play the song's beat. Feldmann didn't want to edit the drums to make it sound like a drum machine, so Marsala opted to play them instead. The track served as the end of the recording sessions, with Marsala playing all the instruments on it.

Feldmann mixed the recordings at Foxy Studios, while Joe Gastwirt mastered them at Ocean View Digital Mastering. Toby Morse of H_{2}O, Ray Cappo of Shelter and Feldmann sang guest vocals on "Falling Down". Feldmann also sang additional backing vocals on "And the Hero Will Drown", "Until the Day I Die", "Anthem of Our Dying Day" and "Razorblades". Marsala later criticized Feldmann's role, saying: "Feldmann had originally changed our sound. All of his records have the same sort of sound, because he's always using the same formulas on everything." Feldmann said the group, who were influenced by bands ranging from Pantera to the Red Hot Chili Peppers, wanted to sound heavier than the album's ultimate sound. He intended for the album to be highly vocal-driven. Marsala wanted it to be a metal record. Feldmann said people would not connect with that sound the same way they would if the band focused on the melodies and vocals.

== Music and lyrics ==
Musically, the album has been described as emo, post-hardcore, alternative rock, pop-punk, screamo, punk rock and scene music. Alan Sculley of The Morning Call said the tracks were in "a middle ground between the heavy rock" style of the Deftones and the "poppier side" Story of the Year had developed prior to moving to California. The band drew comparisons to Thrice, Finch and the Used, an act that Feldmann also produced. Feldmann tried to separate the sound of Marsala, who was more of a trained singer, from the sound he had previously achieved for the Used frontman Bert McCracken, who had a unique voice. He added that the band's riffs leaned to a more progressive sound than the Used, who were more chaotic. Sneed said that while recording in California, the album "took on like a whole sentimental, missing-home type of vibe" with most of the songs being about "missing home and missing friends and memories". Page Avenue was named after a popular east-west freeway close to St. Louis, Missouri. Marsala said it "reflects a bunch of dudes determined to get out of St. Louis and make our dreams happen and while we were doing that we realized how very important our home really was to us".

Marsala came up with the guitar riff for "And the Hero Will Drown" and proceeded to show Phillips, who immediately suggested jamming. As the band wrote the track, they knew it would work as an upbeat, in-your-face type of song. They wrote it with a live setting in mind; Marsala thought the track sounded like Refused. "Until the Day I Die" was written in the group's van while they were touring. Wills wrote the first verse of "Anthem of Our Dying Day", before jamming out the rest of it with the band. Working on the lyrics, Russell had Saves the Day and Glassjaw in mind; Sneed said the track was about ghosts. The initial version of "In the Shadows" sounded much different before the band entered the studio. The group did not like Feldmann's suggestion they make the chorus more chilled-out compared to the heavy nature of the verses.

"Swallow the Knife" is about the band's former guitarist; "The Unheard Voice" was initially intended for inclusion, but was dropped in favor of "Swallow the Knife" as the band felt the album did not have enough slow-tempo songs. Marsala said the title-track summarized the album and represented home. For "Sidewalks", Sneed said the group wanted it to have a "different attitude" compared to the rest of the songs by incorporating strings and bongos. It was almost entirely written by Sneed; it talks about relationships and missing the simpler periods in life. Sneed wrote the main riff before showing it to the rest of the band, who liked it. When learning that they planned to add strings, Sneed wrote the rest of the song with strings in mind. "Divide and Conquer" came about during a period where the band wrote several heavy songs in a row. "Razorblades" was one of the first tracks written by the group's new lineup. "Falling Down" incorporates heavier punk rock sounds by the likes of Blindside. The CD's hidden track consists of bloopers/outtakes from the recording sessions.

== Release and touring ==
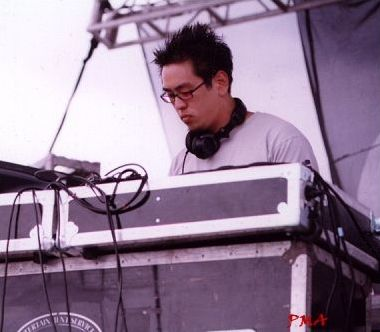
Story of the Year befriended Joe Hahn (pictured) while touring with Linkin Park. After learning he had directed some of his band's music videos, Story of the Year got him to direct a video for "Anthem of Our Dying Day".

After recording, Story of the Year moved back to St. Louis and immediately started touring. On May 7, 2003, it was announced that their debut album was scheduled for release in early July. On May 16, the album's track listing was revealed; the album's release was pushed back to August 27. On June 13, the album's title was announced: Page Avenue. On June 22, the album's release was pushed back again, this time to mid-September. In July, the group appeared on the Warped Tour. Partway through, the group was moved to a bigger stage because of the large crowds they were drawing. On August 9, two songs from the album were posted online. "Until the Day I Die" was released to radio on August 12. The group wanted to tour for a year before their label Maverick Records started pushing a single. They grew up in the 1990s when labels were focused on investing in development. Russell, citing the Red Hot Chili Peppers and their song "Under the Bridge" as an example, said the band was afraid of being labelled sell-outs due to a big single. However, label executives was unwavering in their decision to release "Until the Day I Die".

In August and September, Story of the Year went on tour with Saosin and labelmates Stutterfly. Maverick Records released Page Avenue on September 16. The cover was created by Lawrence Azerrad, Maverick's in-house artist. It features a satellite image taken by Space Imaging over downtown San Diego, California. Marsala said they argued with Maverick about it, asking them to change it to St. Louis. The label said they would but then admitted the cover had already been printed. The band was "pretty pissed". Between October and December, the band supported Sugarcult on their headlining US tour. On November 21, the band appeared on Last Call with Carson Daly. In January and February 2004, the group supported Linkin Park on their US arena tour. During the tour, the band learned Joe Hahn of Linkin Park had directed their music videos, which they really liked. After talking to their management, the band befriended Hahn, who subsequently directed a music video for "Anthem of Our Dying Day". On February 19, 2004, the band appeared on Jimmy Kimmel Live!.

Around this time, Maverick Records was using BigChampagne. The company had a top 20 downloads section, based on data culled from peer-to-peer networks, which featured "Until the Day I Die". However, the song was receiving less airplay on radio than other artists. Jeremy Welt, head of new media at Maverick Records, convinced radio stations in certain markets to play the band during prime-time listening hours, which helped increase sales. In April and May, the group went on a headlining US tour with support from Hazen Street, Letter Kills and Motion City Soundtrack. "Anthem of Our Dying Day" was released to radio on April 13; followed by a music video on April 28. The group performed on the Warped Tour again. When it ended the group took a month's break. In September and October, the band headlined the 2004 edition of the Nintendo Fusion Tour, which also featured Lostprophets, My Chemical Romance, Letter Kills, Anberlin and Autopilot Off. "Sidewalks" was released to radio on October 5. Russell and Phillips co-directed the video for the song, which was based on its sound than its lyrics, produced by production company Villains.

== Reception ==
Professional ratings
Review scores
Source	Rating
AllMusic	3/5 stars
The AU Review	Favorable
Exclaim!	Favorable
Melodic	3.5/5 stars

=== Critical response ===
AllMusic reviewer Stephen Cramer singled out Marsala's unwavering vocals as a highlight of the album. Dave Roberts of The AU Review viewed it as a bit over-produced, though it had credible teenage emotion. Cramer noted the band's reoccurring "flare for the dramatic" on Page Avenue. He called it a decent, Dashboard Confessional-esque debut, with "crunchy" ballads showing the band can be both tasteful and fierce. The Nerve writer Adam Simpkins said Story of the Year "takes the worst elements of Death by Stereo", merging them with lyrics that "would make Dashboard Confessional wince".

Johan Wippsson of Melodic wrote that the band had made a refreshing take on punk, noting that they had the possibility to be as big as the Used. Exclaim! writer Sam Sutherland added to the Used point, mentioning that a few songs appear to be candidly taken from that band's self-titled debut album. He cited "Until the Day I Die" as a good example of what the rest of Page Avenue sounds like with its appealing hooks and melodies, combined with an acceptable amount of screaming vocals and octave parts to please people who are seeking more of a bite to their music. Cramer similarly highlighted the group's "steady and layered" instrumental work.

Sutherland said the album was "excellent" overall, "instantly listenable and catchy as hell". Despite being a decade old the record "is as good as it ever was", according to Roberts. Wippsson added that it was an enjoyable record and that fans of this kind of music would be content. Simpkins, meanwhile, noted an influence from hardcore, "but for some unknown reason they sabotage each song with pissy laments or a string-arrangement".

=== Commercial performance and legacy ===
Page Avenue peaked at number 51 on the Billboard 200 chart. It reached number one on the Heatseekers Albums chart. By January 2004, it had sold close to 150,000 copies. By April, the album was certified gold by the Recording Industry Association of America (RIAA), one of the first of the post-hardcore genre to do so. As of February 2011, it had sold over 900,000 copies. "Until the Day I Die" charted at number 12 on the Alternative Songs chart. It also charted in the UK at number 62. "Anthem of Our Dying Day" charted at number 10 on the Alternative Songs chart. "Sidewalks" charted at number 40 on the Alternative Songs chart. Cleveland Scene said Page Avenue and "Until the Day I Die" helped push screamo into the mainstream musical landscape. Cleveland.com ranked "Until the Day I Die" at number 79 on their list of the top 100 pop-punk songs.

In February 2011, the group performed Page Avenue in its entirety for a one-off hometown show. An acoustic re-make of the album was released in October 2013 to celebrate the album's 10th anniversary. The band decided to do this instead of simply re-recording, remixing or remastering the original. Most of the album focused around piano and string arrangements, instead of acoustic guitars as Marsala felt the piano gave a more dramatic vibe that fit better with the songs. Following the release, the band performed on the Warped Tour. They also headlined the Scream It Like You Mean It tour in the US playing Page Avenue in its entirety. During this tour, a limited number of copies of the anniversary release were made available. In November 2017, the album was released on vinyl by SRC Vinyl.

== Track listing ==
All songs written by Story of the Year, except "Sidewalks" and "Swallow the Knife" co-written with John Feldmann.

No.	Title	Length
1.	"And the Hero Will Drown"	3:13
2.	"Until the Day I Die"	3:55
3.	"Anthem of Our Dying Day"	3:36
4.	"In the Shadows"	3:33
5.	"Dive Right In"	3:15
6.	"Swallow the Knife"	3:36
7.	"Burning Years"	3:07
8.	"Page Avenue"	3:37
9.	"Sidewalks"	3:34
10.	"Divide and Conquer"	3:04
11.	"Razorblades"	3:21
12.	"Falling Down" (included untitled hidden tracks of studio outtakes)	3:58
Total length:		41:49

Page Avenue: Ten Years and Counting
No.	Title	Length
1.	"And the Hero Will Drown"	3:17
2.	"Until the Day I Die"	4:03
3.	"Anthem of Our Dying Day"	3:22
4.	"In the Shadows"	3:13
5.	"Dive Right In"	3:05
6.	"Swallow the Knife"	3:42
7.	"Page Avenue"	3:34
8.	"Sidewalks"	3:24
9.	"Divide and Conquer"	3:06
10.	"Razorblades"	4:07
Total length:		34:53

== Personnel ==
Personnel per booklet, except where noted.

Story of the Year

- Dan Marsala – lead vocals; drums (track 12)
- Ryan Phillips – lead guitar
- Adam Russell – bass, art
- Josh Wills – drums (tracks 1–11)
- Philip Sneed – rhythm guitar (tracks 1, 4–10 and 12)

Additional musicians

- Greg Haupt – rhythm guitar (tracks 2, 3 and 11)
- Toby Morse – guest vocals (track 12)
- Ray Cappo – guest vocals (track 12)
- John Feldmann – guest vocals (track 12), additional backing vocals (tracks 1–3 and 11)
- Bert McCracken – additional backing vocals (track 3)

Production

- John Feldmann – producer, engineer, mixing
- Mark Blewett – additional engineering
- Joe Gastwirt – mastering
- Space Imaging – satellite image
- Lawrence Azerrad – cover

== Charts ==
=== Weekly charts ===
Weekly chart performance for Page Avenue
Chart (2003–2005)	Peak position
Australian Hitseekers Albums (ARIA)	13
Canadian Albums (Nielsen SoundScan)	97
UK Rock & Metal Albums (Official Charts)	27
US Billboard 200	51
US Heatseekers Albums (Billboard)	1

=== Year-end charts ===
Year-end chart performance for Page Avenue
Chart (2004)	Position
US Billboard 200	132

== Certifications ==
Certifications for Page Avenue
Region	Certification	Certified units/sales
United States (RIAA)	Platinum	1,000,000^{‡}
^{‡} Sales+streaming figures based on certification alone.

== See also ==
- The Artist in the Ambulance – the 2003 album by Thrice, the sound of which Page Avenue was compared to
- What It Is to Burn – the 2002 album by Finch, the sound of which Page Avenue was compared to
