= Frank Borin =

American film director

Frank Borin is an American filmmaker, music video director and producer. He frequently worked with his collaborator Ryan Smith under the pseudonym Smith n' Borin and has directed music videos for pop-punk bands including Simple Plan, Bowling for Soup, Good Charlotte, New Found Glory and Story of the Year, as well as Zayn Malik, Harry Styles, Kanye West, and Jack Harlow, and was nominated for the Grammy Awards in 2021 and 2022. He is the co-founder of the production company UnderWonder Content alongside his wife Ivanna Borin.

== Biography ==
Frank has directed and executive produced music videos for artists like Harry Styles, Normani and her song "Wild Side" featuring Cardi B, Doja Cat and her song "We Own The Night," The Weeknd, Post Malone, Lil Nas X, Kanye West, The Wanted, Hurt, Eminem, Angel Haze's song "Battle Cry," and Yungblud. One of Borin's best known projects is the music video for "Nail Tech" by Jack Harlow, which has received over 13 million views.

In 2005, Borin and Smith were slated to directing a family comedy film for Lions Gate Films, titled Kidnapped and starring Lil' JJ and Bobb'e J. Thompson but it was cancelled for unknown reason. In 2009, Borin was hired by Paramount Pictures to directing the science fiction horror film, The Butcherhouse Chronicles, based on a stage play, and produced by Michael Bay through his company Platinum Dunes. There have been no further announcements since.

== Awards and nominations ==
Year	Award ceremony	Prize	Recipient/Nominated work	Results	Ref.
2021	Grammy Awards	Best Music Video	"Montero (Call Me By Your Name)" - Lil Nas X	Nominated	
2022	Grammy Awards	Best Music Video	"As It Was" - Harry Styles	Nominated	
