= Story of the Year =

American rock band

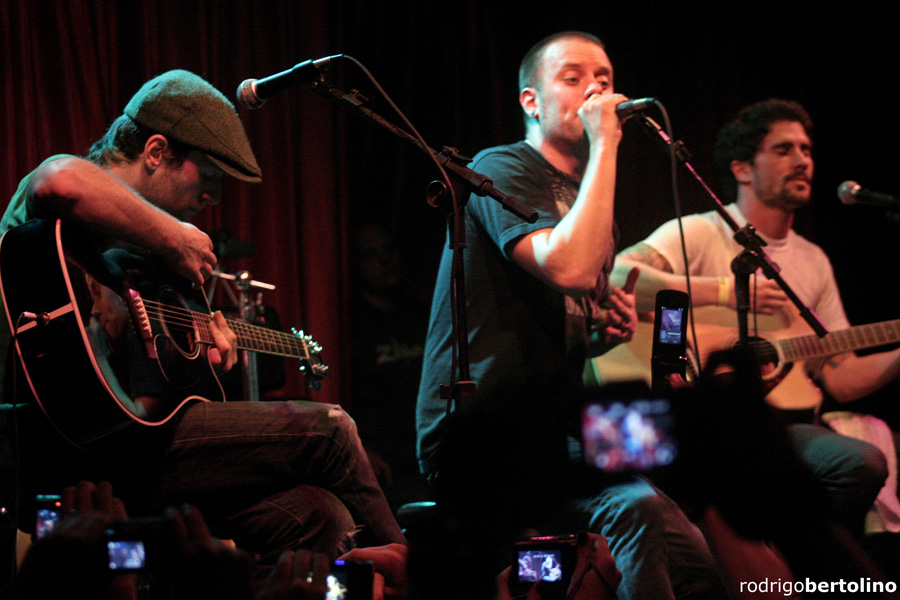
- Story of the Year performing in São Paulo in 2009

Background information
- Also known as: 67 North (1995–1998); Big Blue Monkey (1998–2002)
- Origin: St. Louis, Missouri, U.S.
- Genres: Post-hardcore; pop-punk; emo; melodic hardcore; alternative rock
- Years active: 1995–2011; 2013–present
- Labels: Criterion; Maverick; Reprise; Epitaph; SharpTone
- Spinoffs: Greek Fire; Destroy Rebuild Until God Shows; The Fuck Off and Dies
- Members: Dan Marsala; Ryan Phillips; Adam Russell; Josh Wills
- Past members: John Taylor; Perry West; Greg Haupt; Philip Sneed
- Website: storyoftheyear.net

Story of the Year is an American rock band formed in St. Louis, Missouri, in 1995 under the name 67 North. Originally playing nu metal, the band eventually changed their name to Big Blue Monkey in 1998, and then subsequently changed it again to Story of the Year in 2002, after the release of their self-titled EP on the indie label Criterion Records. At the time, they claimed they had discovered that a blues group named Big Blue Monkey already existed. Later, on their podcast Page Avenue Crew, they clarified that they just did not care for the name and had just made up the excuse of another band having the same name.

It would not be until eight years after forming that Story of the Year saw its first piece of commercial success in its major label debut album, Page Avenue (2003), containing the popular singles "Until the Day I Die" and "Anthem of Our Dying Day". A second album, In the Wake of Determination, followed in 2005, but did not achieve the commercial success of its predecessor. The band eventually left Maverick and signed to independent label Epitaph Records to release their third album, The Black Swan on April 22, 2008, followed by 2010's The Constant.

On August 11, 2017, Story of the Year teased a 90-second clip of a new song off their crowd-funded fifth studio album. The pledge campaign began in November 2016 and was completely funded in less than three days. The band used high-profile producer Aaron Sprinkle and mixers Tom Lord-Alge & J Hall to complete their fifth studio album. They confirmed via the pledge site that the new album will be titled Wolves which was released through PledgeMusic on December 1, 2017. The album's wide release was on December 8, 2017. And in March of 2023 as a 4 Piece band again, but this time with Sneed gone and the return of Bassist Adam Russell, the band saw the release of Tear Me to Pieces. They followed this up with a world tour in 2023–2024.

== History ==
=== 67 North & Big Blue Monkey (1995–2002) ===
The band were formed in 1995 under the name "67 North" by guitarist Ryan Phillips of the band Means Well, drummer Dan Marsala, vocalist John Taylor and bassist Perry West. They changed their name to "Big Blue Monkey" in 1998 before releasing the first EP Three Days Broken that same year. In 1999, they released another EP called Truth in Separation, their last under the line-up. In 2000, West and Taylor would both depart from the group, leading to Marsala moving to vocal duties, and the recruitment of Means Well drummer Josh Wills as well as the members' long time friend Adam Russell of the band Locash on bass duties, despite him never having played bass prior (previously a guitarist prior to joining the band). It was at this point that the band relocated to Orange County, California, where the final Big Blue Monkey EP was released in 2002 titled Story of the Year, which they would then change their name to later that year.

=== Page Avenue (2002–2004) ===
After spending many years as a local band with different line-ups, recording three EPs and multiple demos. Story of the Year signed a deal with Maverick Records in 2002, then recorded and released their first album, Page Avenue in September 2003. The first single from that album was "Until the Day I Die". It first received radio airplay around July–August 2003 on stations like KPNT. The second single, "Anthem of Our Dying Day", featured a music video directed by Joe Hahn of Linkin Park. Pushed by the success of both singles, Page Avenue was a success and was certified Gold by the RIAA in 2004, and went on to sell 846,000 copies in the US by 2007.

MTV News reported on their website that during a radio show in May 2004, the band members of Story of the Year got into a fight with the roadies of metal band Godsmack. Pictures of the band members' bruised faces were posted on their homepage. The members of Godsmack were not involved in the fight.

Live in the Lou/Bassassins (a CD/DVD combo of live performances and touring video) was released on May 10, 2005. It was certified Gold by the RIAA in late 2005, indicating shipment of over 50,000 units as it is video longform format.

=== In the Wake of Determination (2004–2006) ===
After the Page Avenue tour ended in late 2004, Story of the Year returned to the studio with producer Steve Evetts in 2005, to record their second studio album. In the Wake of Determination, released on October 11, 2005, is much heavier sounding than the previous album. As of October 2007, the album had sold 180,000 units and failed to achieve the same success that the band's two previous releases had. Although not as successful as its predecessor, the album debuted at No. 19 on the Billboard 200.

=== The Black Swan (2007–2009) ===
Story of the Year released The Black Swan in 2008. For the album, they brought back producer John Feldmann and Elvis Baskette. The album received praise from music critics and achieved decent commercial success, more so than the previous album. The success was led by the first single off album, "Wake Up".

For the recording of The Black Swan, Story of the Year decided to end their five-year relationship with Maverick and signed with Epitaph Records.

Story of the Year played on 2008's Taste of Chaos International tour with Atreyu.

=== The Constant (2009–2010) ===
In May 2009, Story of the Year began work on another album. On December 31, the band released "I'm Alive" to radio airplay.

The Constant, was released on February 16, 2010 through Epitaph Records. The Deluxe Edition, available on iTunes, has two bonus tracks, "Your Unsung Friend" and "Tonight We Fall".

Story of the Year recorded a cover of Waterproof Blonde's song "Just Close Your Eyes" for professional wrestler Christian Cage. Their cover version was included in WWE Music album A New Day, Vol. 10 that was released on January 28, 2010.

=== Side-projects and hiatus (2011–2013) ===
Bassist Adam Russell was announced to be the bassist of post-hardcore band Destroy Rebuild Until God Shows, along with Craig Owens (lead vocalist, Chiodos), Matt Good (guitarist, From First to Last), Nick Martin (guitarist, Underminded) and Aaron Stern (drummer, Matchbook Romance). Russell left Destroy Rebuild Until God Shows in 2012.

Singer Dan Marsala formed a comedy punk rock side-project in 2009 named The Fuck Off and Dies. The band has gone on to release two full-length albums, Songs In The Key Of Fuck (2011) and Dear Liver (2015).

Guitarists Ryan Phillips and Philip Sneed continued to pursue their side project, Greek Fire. They have released a debut EP and two independent albums, Deus Ex Machina and Lost/Found.

Bassist Adam Russell and guitarist Ryan Phillips set out to make a movie about rise and fall of the music industry and where it stands today called "Who Killed (Or Saved!) The Music Industry". Funded by Kickstarter, they were filming in 2013.

On February 4, 2011, at The Pageant in their hometown of St. Louis, the band performed their first album, Page Avenue, in its entirety, as well as other fan favorites. They posted that this was a "thank you" show to all their dedicated fans for 10 years together. City Spud, of the St. Louis rap group St. Lunatics, made a guest appearance during the show.

=== Reunion, Page Avenue 10th anniversary tour (2013–2014) ===
On March 8, 2013, the band announced they reunited for a world tour to celebrate the tenth anniversary of their debut album Page Avenue. It was also stated that the band has re–recorded Page Avenue, entitled Page Avenue: Ten Years and Counting with release date on October 8, 2013. Originally they planned it to be a full acoustic version of the album, but after the collaboration with City Spud during their concert in 2011 they decided to re–record the album with a different feel to each song rather than just acoustic versions.

=== Wolves and lineup changes (2014–2019) ===
On September 30, 2014, the band announced on their Facebook page that bass player Adam Russell left the band. The band also said they were writing a fifth album. On November 7, 2016, the band announced via their PledgeMusic page that they would be releasing a new album sometime in 2017 entitled Wolves. On October 25, 2017, via their Facebook page, the band confirmed the PledgeMusic exclusive release date of Wolves on December 1, with the album's wide release taking place on December 8. According to Wall of Sound, the album has hints of the band's earlier work scattered throughout and a vintage feel, akin to that of Stranger Things.

In March 2018, Philip Sneed announced his departure from the band citing he was let go via management, and not long after, the band announced the return of Adam Russell.

=== Tear Me to Pieces (2020–2025) ===
Beginning in October 2020, during the COVID-19 pandemic, Story of the Year performed their first three albums in three individual livestreams under the title Ghost Signal.

In March 2021, Page Avenue was certified Platinum by the RIAA.

In January 2022, it was announced that Story of the Year would join the When We Were Young festival among over 60 other emo bands including My Chemical Romance and Paramore. The band released their new single "Real Life" on August 24, alongside the announcement that they had signed with SharpTone Records and a new set of tour dates alongside Hawthorne Heights and Escape the Fate. In October, it was announced that Story of the Year's sixth album would be called Tear Me to Pieces, with a new music video for the title track. The album was released on March 10, 2023.

=== A.R.S.O.N. (2025–present) ===
In October 2025, the band released the first single "Gasoline (All Rage Still Only Numb)" for their seventh studio album A.R.S.O.N., which was released on February 13th, 2026.

The band are confirmed to be appearing at Welcome to Rockville taking place in Daytona Beach, Florida in May 2026. They will support Silverstein on tour later in the year along with Origami Angel.

== Musical style and influences ==
Story of the Year has been categorized under several genres, especially emo, screamo, post-hardcore, and pop-punk. AllMusic describe the band as hard rock, as well as "emo punk" and "emo-inflected post-grunge" and the band has also been labeled as alternative rock and melodic hardcore. Story of the Year's material as Big Blue Monkey is considered nu metal.

The band's influences include BoySetsFire, the Used, At the Drive-In, Braid, Sunny Day Real Estate, Dashboard Confessional, the Get Up Kids, Bad Religion, Skid Row, Guns N' Roses, Nirvana, Pearl Jam, NOFX, Pennywise, Sick of It All, and H_{2}O.

== Band members ==
Current

- Dan Marsala – lead vocals (2000–present), drums, percussion (1995–2000)
- Ryan Phillips – lead guitar (1995–present), rhythm guitar (1995–2000, 2014–present)
- Adam Russell – bass guitar, backing vocals (2000–2014, 2018–present)
- Josh Wills – drums, percussion (2000–present)

Former

- John Taylor — lead vocals (1995–2000)
- Perry West — bass guitar (1995–2000)
- Greg Haupt — rhythm guitar (2000–2002; one-off guest appearance in 2020; died 2022)
- Philip Sneed – rhythm guitar (2003–2014), bass guitar (2014–2018), backing vocals (2003–2018), keyboards, piano (2007–2018)

== Discography ==
Studio albums

- Page Avenue (2003)
- In the Wake of Determination (2005)
- The Black Swan (2008)
- The Constant (2010)
- Wolves (2017)
- Tear Me to Pieces (2023)
- A.R.S.O.N. (2026)
