= Terbaik =

Greatest hits album by Kotak
- Released: November 12, 2012
- Recorded: 2008–2012
- Genre: Rock
- Length: 49:38
- Label: Warner Music Indonesia

Kotak chronology
Energi (2010)	Terbaik (2012)

Singles from Terbaik
- 1. "Kecuali Kamu" Released: October 2012

Terbaik (The Best) is a greatest hits album by Indonesian band Kotak. It was released on November 12, 2012 by Warner Music Indonesia. The album compiled nine songs from two previous studio albums with four newest songs, "Hijaukan Bumi", "I Love You", "Kecuali Kamu" and "Jet Lag". In marketing this album, Kotak and the record label working with KFC that this album would be circulated in all KFC stores in Indonesia.

== Track listing ==
No.	Title	Writer(s)	Length
1.	"Hijaukan Bumi"	Tantri, Chua	4:10
2.	"I Love You"	Pay, Dewiq, Kotak	3:13
3.	"Kecuali Kamu"	Pay, Dewiq, Kotak	4:21
4.	"Tendangan Dari Langit"	Cella	4:05
5.	"Terbang"	Pare	3:23
6.	"Pelan Pelan Saja"	Pay, Dewiq, Kotak	3:54
7.	"Tinggalkan Saja"	Cella, Posan, Tantri	3:54
8.	"Beraksi"	Cella	3:24
9.	"Cuci Mata"	Cella	4:08
10.	"Cinta Jangan Pergi"	Posan & Dodoy	3:11
11.	"Kosong Toejoeh"	Cella, Posan, Tantri	3:38
12.	"Energi"	Cella	2:57
13.	"Jet Lag (ft. Simple Plan)"	Charles Comeau, Nolan Sipe, Pierre Bouvier, Ryan Petersen	3:20
Total length:			49:38
