= Save You (Simple Plan song) =

Single by Simple Plan

from the album Simple Plan
- Released: August 14, 2008
- Recorded: 2007
- Genre: Alternative rock
- Length: 3:45
- Label: Lava; Atlantic
- Songwriters: Pierre Bouvier; Chuck Comeau; Arnold Lanni
- Producer: Dave Fortman

Simple Plan singles chronology
"Your Love Is a Lie" (2008)	"Save You" (2008)	"Can't Keep My Hands off You" (2011)

"Save You" is the third and last single from Simple Plan's self titled album. The ballad was announced as the third single in a message to "SP Crew", the band's official members-only club. Lead singer Pierre Bouvier has stated in interviews that the song deals with his brother Jay, who was diagnosed with non-Hodgkin lymphoma. Released on October 10, 2008, "Save You" would debut at number 88 on the Canadian Hot 100.

== Song composition ==
The song is in common time throughout and follows the basic ABABCB skeleton, wherein 'A' is the verse, 'B' is the prechorus and chorus, and 'C' is the bridge.

The song's verses are in the key of C natural minor and feature a i-VI-III-VII progression repeated three times, with a chord change every two beats. The song then enters a prechorus that slows into a half time. Background "Ohs" are heard as a slow B♭-A♭-B♭ progression is played. Using the B♭ (V/I), the song then modulates into E♭ major for the chorus which features a I-V-IV-V progression with a chord change every measure. This progression is repeated twice. The bridge is also in the key of C natural minor, but features a progression of i-VII-VI-VII, with a chord change every two beats. This progression is repeated six times. In the last three repeats, lead guitarist Jeff Stinco plays a short guitar interlude. The song ends in E♭ major on the dominant chord.

== Music video ==
The music video was shot in late September 2008.

The video premiered Friday October 24, 2008. It shows the band members performing in an open space, and then cancer survivors are shown lying on the floor, gradually they rise, and at the end of the video, their names appear. The video features band members' relatives who have survived cancer, and other cancer survivors such as Kevin Hearn, Sharon Osbourne, Marissa Jaret Winokur, René Angélil, Delta Goodrem, then Montreal Canadiens captain Saku Koivu and Bif Naked.

Two versions of the video were launched at their website.

== Track listing ==
iTunes EP
No.	Title	Length
1.	"Save You"	3:46
2.	"Welcome to My Life" (Live from Laval)	5:06
3.	"Addicted" (Acoustic) (Live in New York City)	3:54

== Chart performance ==
"Save You" debuted at #88 on the Canadian Hot 100 based on airplay alone, and rose up the chart each week up to the top forty. On the ending week of October 19 it was released for digital downloads on iTunes, and it received 7,000 downloads in that week causing the song to skyrocket from #53 to #18. It was marked as the sales gainer for that week, and it is Simple Plan's third top twenty hit on the chart from their self-titled album (Simple Plan).

Chart (2008)	Peak position
Australia (ARIA)	92
Canada Hot 100 (Billboard)	18
Canada CHR/Top 40 (Billboard)	19
Canada Hot AC (Billboard)	12
Czech Republic Airplay (ČNS IFPI)	95
