= Summer Paradise =

Single by Simple Plan featuring K'naan or Sean Paul

from the album Get Your Heart On!
- Released: December 13, 2011
- Recorded: August–November 2010
- Genre: Pop rock; reggae
- Length: 3:54
- Label: Lava; Atlantic
- Songwriters: Emanuel Kiriakou; Keinan Warsame; Pierre Bouvier; Chuck Comeau
- Producer: Brian Howes

Simple Plan singles chronology
"Astronaut" (2011)	"Summer Paradise" (2011)	"I Don't Wanna Go to Bed" (2015)

K'naan singles chronology
"Bang Bang" (2010)	"Summer Paradise" (2011)	"Is Anybody Out There?" (2012)

Sean Paul singles chronology
"She Doesn't Mind" (2011)	"Summer Paradise" (2012)	"Hold On" (2012)

"Summer Paradise" is a song by Canadian rock band Simple Plan, featuring Somali-Canadian rapper K'Naan or Jamaican reggae artist Sean Paul. It was released on December 13, 2011, in Australia as the fourth official single from their fourth studio album, Get Your Heart On! (2011). It was written by Emanuel Kiriakou, Keinan Warsame, and the band, and produced by Brian Howes. The song is a reggae and ska punk-based track and it was inspired by the band vocalist's hobby of surfing. It was released in Australia with an accompanying music video with shots of the "Get Your Heart On Tour!" and scenes of the band in Barbados and on the beach. The track was released in the United Kingdom as the lead single.

It was released around the world on February 28, 2012, with guest vocals from Sean Paul, rather than K'Naan. A music video featuring Paul was also released. It peaked at number 8 on the Canadian Hot 100 chart, becoming their highest-charting single since "Crazy". The song became their best charting single in Australia, Austria, Belgium, Denmark, Germany, Israel, Italy, Netherlands, Norway, and United Kingdom.

== Background and release ==
The song was inspired by Pierre Bouvier's hobby of surfing, which is an important part of his life. He told Buzznet: "I've spent a lot of time out there when the surf is not that great and you're waiting for a wave, just sitting on the water seeing dolphins and seals go by, taking in a beautiful sunset. I think about music a lot and have probably thought about some lyrics out there. Also this song called "Summer Paradise" on the album has got that beautiful vibe that I can probably attribute to going on surf trips." The band announced the song as a single, while posting a music video for it, on December 12, 2011. A day later, December 13, 2011, the song was released on the Australian iTunes. The band said that the song will be released around the world later in 2012.

A new version of the song featuring Sean Paul was released on the iTunes Store on February 28, 2012 around the world, including the United States. The band has also recorded a version in French with the verses and half the chorus in French.

In 2013 Simple Plan had also done a Japanese version of the song for their Japanese fans collaborating with Japanese rock band, ONE OK ROCK's vocalist Taka as well as an alternate version featuring pop group MKTO.

== Composition ==
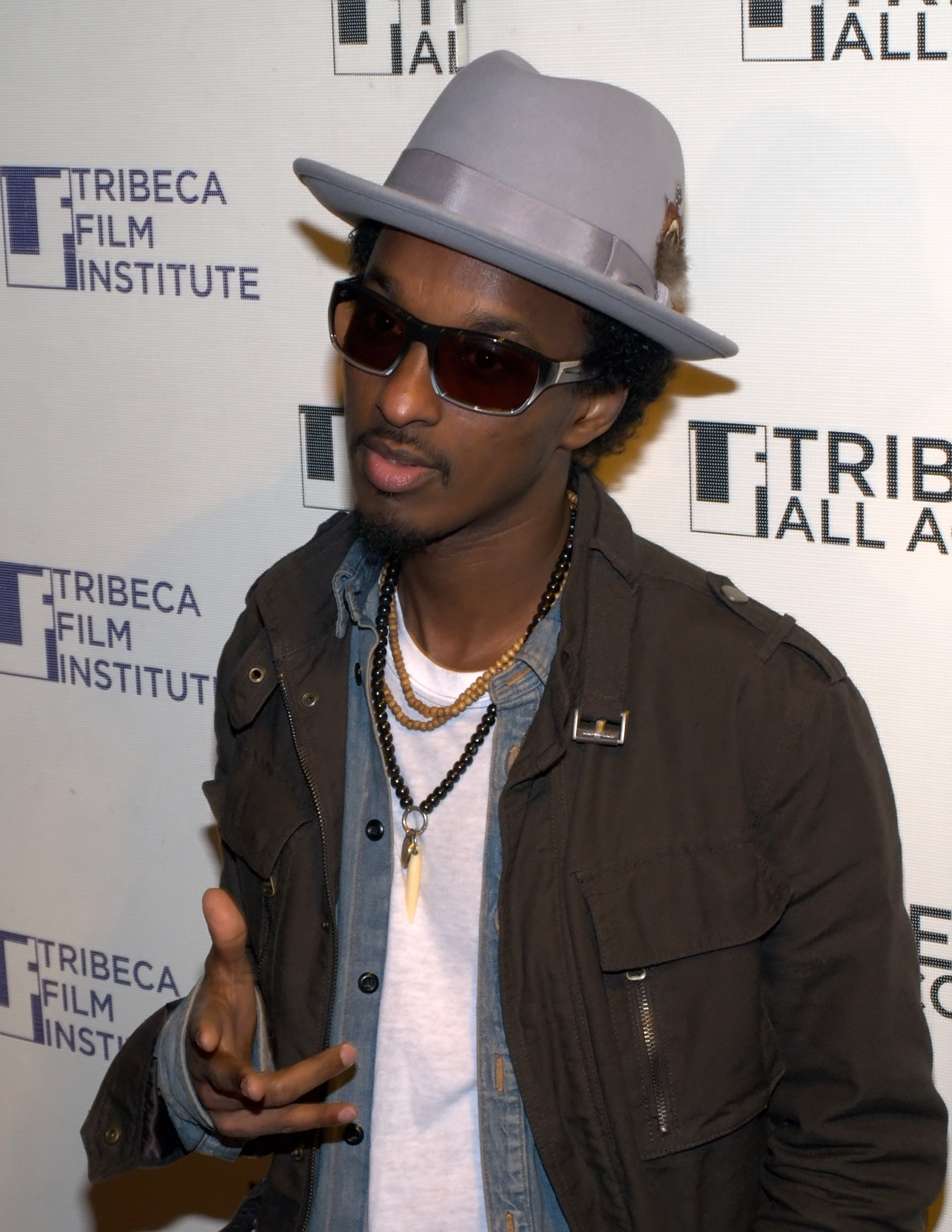
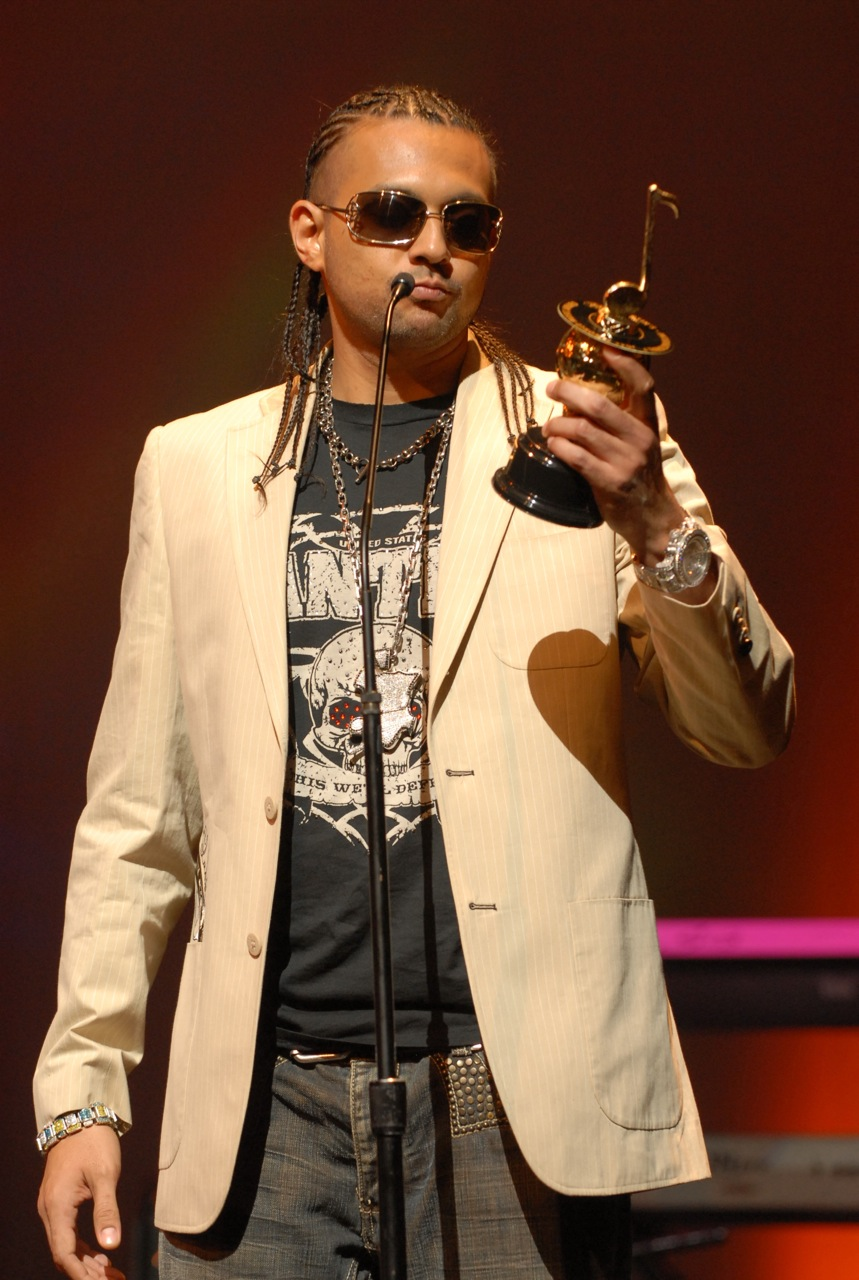
Originally, the song features K'Naan, with his version featured on the album. For the single, Sean Paul is the guest vocalist.

"Summer Paradise" was written by the band, alongside Emanuel Kiriakou and Keinan Warsame and produced by Brian Howes. It's written in D Major with a common chord progression. Somali-Canadian rapper/singer K'naan is the guest vocalist on the track. Frontman Pierre Bouvier told Buzznet they really wanted him on this track as they thought, "his voice suits the song perfectly."

== Critical reception ==
The song has received positive reviews from contemporary music critics. AbsolutePunk's Joe DeAndrea wrote a positive review for the song, praising K'Naan for "add his swag to the reggae inspired track" and said that "it surprisingly works and sounds like a song that Plain White T's wish they could write. Sputnikmusic's Davey Boy wrote favorably that "ill-fitting K'naan collaboration 'Summer Paradise' jumps on the Jason Mraz/Bruno Mars bandwagon, being a summery acoustic tune with Caribbean influences." Amy Sciarretto from Artist Direct wrote that the song is "a shimmery uptempo rocker that should blow the roof off wherever you are listening to it. It's a terrific, sun-drenched, warm-weather, top down, summer-ready number that you will want to listen to when you are at the beach or hanging out on the back porch and tossing back brews with your friends, bros, favorite ladies and more."

Mahima Mathur from "High on Score" gave a positive review for the remix version featuring Sean Paul. She wrote that "it’s a nice breezy affair with picturesque scenery on the album cover. Along with having a very caribbean [sic] feel, it’ll manage to get your spirits up while you’re sipping on those colourful Bahama mamas." Another positive reception of the remix version came from "Daily Spin"'s Rob Buchanan, who wrote that "It’s a quintessential summer track, with all the hooks and melodies to make you feel like you’re either at the beach, or on your way there having the time of your life." He also noted that "the guitar-riff sounds dangerously like Train’s "Hey, Soul Sister."

== Chart performance ==
The song debuted at number forty on the ARIA Charts on the week of January 2, 2012. It has since peaked at number four, becoming the group's highest chart single in Australia to date.

The version featuring Sean Paul debuted at number one-hundred on the Canadian Hot 100. In the second week, it moved to number seventy-four and has reached a peak of number eight, so far. The song became the band's highest charting single in Canada since 2005's hit "Crazy".

The single also peaked higher on the Germany's Media Control AG, reaching number 9 and becoming their best single on the charts. Similar, on the Italy's FIMI chart, the song became their first single to chart on the country. It peaked at number 7. In the United Kingdom, the song debuted at number 12, becoming the band's first top 20 hit and best charting single to date.

== Music video ==
A still from the video, where Bouvier is sitting on the beach, playing a guitar.

On December 12, 2011, a music video was posted onto the band's official website. K'Naan was featured in the song of this video. The video features shots of the "Get Your Heart On Tour!" and of the band vocalist Pierre Bouvier on beaches. K'naan does not appear in this video, however, his vocals remain.

The band wrote a message for the fans, about the video:

"Once again, Australia is ahead of the curve! They are the first country in the world to release Summer Paradise as a single off Get Your Heart On! and we couldn't be more excited! This is one of our favorite songs off the album and we can't wait for everyone to hear it. The sun and warm weather are coming to OZ and we really hope this song will be a part of your summer and put a smile on your face. We had so much fun on our last Australian visit that we decided to make a special "OZ Tour" video for our fans down under and around the world. We hope you will enjoy it and that it will bring back good memories if you were at the shows! We had a blast with you guys and can't wait to come back! For all our fans around the world, don't worry... "Summer Paradise" will be coming to your country really soon! We plan on releasing the song worldwide and film another video as well. We will let you know as soon as we have more details. Thanks for all your support and can't wait to see you all on tour in 2012!."

An official video featuring Sean Paul was shot in Barbados, featuring Bouvier enjoying the sunset and strums his guitar while his bandmates either lie in the sand or take a dip in the ocean, joined by Paul and several locals from Barbados, among them models Jessica Williams and Estefania. It was shot on the beaches of Bathsheba where rocks are eroded by the sea as well as Cherry Tree Hill for the golfing scenes. Some shots were also taken in a Rum Shack where they are playing dominos. The band posted photos from the video shoot. The video premiered on March 29, 2012.

A third version of the video was released on June 11, 2013 for the remix featuring MKTO, combining the Barbados footage with new sequences shot in the United States.

On May 6, 2013, a version of the song featuring Taka of One OK Rock was released on YouTube via Warner Music Japan channel. The music video depicts Simple Plan performing at PunkSpring Festival 2013 in Japan with Taka present on stage. The scene was also interchanged with the bands traveling around Tokyo.

== Track listings ==
Digital single – featuring K'Naan

1. "Summer Paradise" (featuring K'Naan) – 3:55

Digital single – featuring Sean Paul

1. "Summer Paradise" (featuring Sean Paul) – 3:54

Digital EP – Germany, Austria & Switzerland

1. "Summer Paradise" (featuring Sean Paul) – 3:54
2. "Summer Paradise" – 3:54
3. "Astronaut" (Naked version) – 3:37
4. "Loser of the Year" (Acoustic version) – 3:49

Digital EP – United Kingdom

1. "Summer Paradise" (featuring Sean Paul) – 3:54
2. "Summer Paradise" (featuring K'Naan) – 3:55
3. "Summer Paradise" – 3:54
4. "Astronaut" (Naked version) – 3:37
5. "Loser of the Year" (Acoustic version) – 3:49

CD single – Germany, Austria & Switzerland

1. "Summer Paradise" (featuring Sean Paul) – 3:57
2. "Summer Paradise" – 3:54

== Charts and certifications ==
=== Weekly charts ===
Weekly chart performance for "Summer Paradise"
Chart (2012)	Peak position
Australia (ARIA)	4
Austria (Ö3 Austria Top 40)	7
Belgium (Ultratop 50 Flanders)	24
Belgium (Ultratop 50 Wallonia)	16
Canada Hot 100 (Billboard)	8
Canada AC (Billboard)	3
Canada CHR/Top 40 (Billboard)	11
Canada Hot AC (Billboard)	8
Czech Republic Airplay (ČNS IFPI)	10
Denmark (Tracklisten)	18
Europe (Euro Digital Songs)	15
France (SNEP)	21
Germany (Media Control AG)	9
Hungary (Rádiós Top 40)	11
Ireland (IRMA)	52
Israel International Airplay (Media Forest)	1
Italy (FIMI)	7
Japan Hot 100 (Billboard)	100
Lebanon (Lebanese Top 20)	6
Mexico (Billboard Mexican Airplay)	44
Netherlands (Dutch Top 40)	7
Netherlands (Mega Single Top 100)	22
New Zealand (RIANZ)	28
Norway (VG-lista)	5
Poland Airplay (ZPAV)	4
Scottish Singles Sales (Official Charts)	8
Slovakia Airplay (ČNS IFPI)	7
Spain (PROMUSICAE)	47
Spain Airplay (PROMUSICAE)	20
Sweden (Sverigetopplistan)	4
Switzerland (Schweizer Hitparade)	11
UK Singles (Official Charts)	12
US Rock Digital Songs (Billboard)	35
Venezuela Pop Rock General (Record Report)	9

=== Year-end charts ===
Year-end chart performance for "Summer Paradise"
Chart (2012)	Position
Australia (ARIA)	59
Austria (Ö3 Austria Top 40)	47
Belgium (Ultratop Wallonia)	95
Canada (Canadian Hot 100)	22
France (SNEP)	81
Germany (Official German Charts)	60
Hungary (Rádiós Top 40)	46
Italy (FIMI)	27
Netherlands (Dutch Top 40)	50
Netherlands (Single Top 100)	91
Israel (Media Forest)	9
Sweden (Sverigetopplistan)	50
Switzerland (Schweizer Hitparade)	54

=== Certifications ===
Certifications for "Summer Paradise"
Region	Certification	Certified units/sales
Australia (ARIA)	2× Platinum	140,000^{^}
Austria (IFPI Austria)	Gold	15,000^{*}
Canada (Music Canada)	5× Platinum	400,000^{‡}
Germany (BVMI)	Gold	150,000^{^}
Italy (FIMI)	Platinum	30,000^{*}
Switzerland (IFPI Switzerland)	Platinum	30,000^{^}
United Kingdom (BPI)	Silver	200,000^{‡}
Streaming
Denmark (IFPI Danmark)	Platinum	1,800,000^{†}
^{*} Sales figures based on certification alone.^{^} Shipments figures based on certification alone.^{‡} Sales+streaming figures based on certification alone.^{†} Streaming-only figures based on certification alone.

== Release history ==
Release dates for "Summer Paradise"
Country	Date	Format	Label
Australia	December 13, 2011	Digital download – featuring K'Naan	Lava, Atlantic
Worldwide	February 28, 2012	Digital download – featuring Sean Paul	Lava, Atlantic
Italy	March 2, 2012	Airplay – featuring Sean Paul	Lava, Atlantic
Germany	April 27, 2012	Digital EP, CD single	Lava, Atlantic
Austria	April 27, 2012	Digital EP, CD single	Lava, Atlantic
Switzerland	April 27, 2012	Digital EP, CD single	Lava, Atlantic
United Kingdom	August 19, 2012	Digital EP	Lava, Atlantic
