= I Don't Wanna Go to Bed =

Single by Simple Plan featuring Nelly

from the album Taking One for the Team
- Released: October 15, 2015
- Recorded: 2015
- Genre: Funk-pop; pop rock
- Length: 3:15
- Label: Atlantic
- Songwriters: Pierre Bouvier; Chuck Comeau; Christopher J. Baran; Cornell Haynes

Simple Plan singles chronology
"Summer Paradise" (2012)	"I Don't Wanna Go to Bed" (2015)	"Singing in the Rain" (2016)

Nelly singles chronology
"The Fix" (2015)	"I Don't Wanna Go to Bed" (2015)	"Die a Happy Man" (2016)

"I Don't Wanna Go to Bed" is a song by Canadian rock band Simple Plan featuring American rapper Nelly. The song serves as the lead single for fifth studio album Taking One for the Team and was released to digital retailers on October 15, 2015 through Atlantic Records and WEA International. The song takes a more funk-styled approach compared to most of Simple Plan's previous work.

== Composition ==
"I Don't Wanna Go to Bed" is a pop rock and funk song written in the key of D minor. It features guitar riffs, horns and a beat reminiscent of "Uptown Funk" by Mark Ronson and Bruno Mars.

== Release and reception ==
The song was released on October 15, 2015, with an accompanying music video released on the band's YouTube channel the same day. The song received mixed reactions from music critics: Fuse's first impressions being "confused and delighted". Collin Brennan from Consequence of Sound criticized it for being a poor imitation of "Uptown Funk", calling it "a generic pop song that's a shade too wimpy for the rock club or the nightclub".

== Chart performance ==
Chart (2015)	Peak position
Canada Hot 100 (Billboard)	54
Canada AC (Billboard)	15
Canada CHR/Top 40 (Billboard)	17
Canada Hot AC (Billboard)	9
Mexico (Billboard Ingles Airplay)	41

== Certifications ==
Region	Certification	Certified units/sales
Canada (Music Canada)	Gold	40,000^{‡}
^{‡} Sales+streaming figures based on certification alone.
