= When I'm Gone (Simple Plan song) =

Single by Simple Plan

from the album Simple Plan
- Released: October 29, 2007
- Recorded: 2007
- Genre: Alternative rock; pop-punk
- Length: 3:49 (Album version); 3:42 (Radio edit)
- Label: Lava; Atlantic
- Songwriters: Pierre Bouvier; Chuck Comeau; Nate Hills; Arnold Lanni
- Producers: Danja; Dave Fortman

Simple Plan singles chronology
"Crazy" (2005)	"When I'm Gone" (2007)	"Your Love Is a Lie" (2008)

Audio sample
- When I'm Gone: file; help

"When I'm Gone" is the first single from Simple Plan's self-titled third studio album, Simple Plan. It was released via iTunes and lala.com on October 29, 2007, in conjunction with a live webchat from the band.

== History ==
A 25-second preview of the song was premiered on October 24, 2007 on simpleplan.com. The full song was premiered on simpleplan.com on October 29, 2007. It was done so in conjunction with a webchat with the band members, who answered fan questions during the chat.

The song was made available on iTunes the same day and the album was available for preorder on lala.com the following day (with a download of the single immediately available).

== Music video ==
The band flew to Los Angeles on November 8, 2007 and filmed the video. It was filmed on Sunset Blvd and then in a soundstage outside North Hollywood. Perez Hilton filmed a cameo.

A 40-second pre-production preview of the video was aired on TRL and added to Simple Plan's website on November 6, 2007.

The video was premiered on MTV.com on December 10, 2007, and MuchMusic on December 11. Frank Borin and the band directed the video.

The music video has been available through the band's official channel on YouTube since December 13, 2007 and has since gotten over 17 million views as of December 2013

The music video is about a young woman, played by Zoe Myers, who drives around town to cope with her recent breakup with a former lover, played by Bouvier. She has not got over him, which makes her see him everywhere she goes. In the end, she freaks out and calls Bouvier. Bouvier sees who is calling and ignores the call and continues to enjoy his bottle of beer. Scenes with the band playing against a black backdrop are shown throughout the video.

== Reception ==
The song received a lot of airplay in 2007, making it the most successful single from the album. The song also received positive reviews from critics. Rolling Stone called it "a seize-the-day anthem with a cathartic refrain". Entertainment Weekly in their review of the album recommended downloading "When I'm Gone".

== Charts ==
=== Weekly charts ===
Chart (2007–08)	Peak position
Australia (ARIA)	14
Austria (Ö3 Austria Top 40)	37
Belgium (Ultratip Bubbling Under Flanders)	12
Belgium (Ultratip Bubbling Under Wallonia)	20
Canada Hot 100 (Billboard)	11
Canada CHR/Top 40 (Billboard)	8
Canada Hot AC (Billboard)	9
Czech Republic Airplay (ČNS IFPI)	25
Germany (GfK)	42
Ireland (IRMA)	39
Japan Hot 100 (Billboard)	10
Mexico Anglo (Monitor Latino)	1
Netherlands (Single Top 100)	78
Russia Airplay (TopHit)	63
Scotland Singles (OCC)	24
Sweden (Sverigetopplistan)	23
Switzerland (Schweizer Hitparade)	31
UK Singles (OCC)	26
Venezuela Pop Rock (Record Report)	5

=== Year-end charts ===
Chart (2008)	Position
Australia (ARIA)	93
Canada (Canadian Hot 100)	62
Russia Airplay (TopHit)	176

== Track listing ==
All tracks are written by Simple Plan, Nate Hills and Arnold Lanni, except where noted.

Digital single and European CD single
No.	Title	Length
1.	"When I'm Gone"	3:42

iTunes single
No.	Title	Length
1.	"When I'm Gone"	3:49
2.	"When I'm Gone" (Live in NYC)	3:33

U.S. 7" single
No.	Title	Length
1.	"When I'm Gone"	3:51
2.	"When I'm Gone" (Acoustic version)	3:30

Australian and European CD single / iTunes EP
No.	Title	Writer(s)	Length
1.	"When I'm Gone"		3:49
2.	"Running Out of Time" (non-album track)	Simple Plan; Lanni	3:16
3.	"When I'm Gone" (Acoustic version)		3:29
Total length:			10:33
