= Singin' in the Rain (disambiguation) =

Singin' in the Rain is a 1952 musical film. The title may also refer to:

- "Singin' in the Rain" (song), a 1929 popular song, the title song of the film
- Singin' in the Rain (musical), a 1983 stage adaptation of the film
- "Singing in the Rain" (Simple Plan song), 2016
- "Singing in the Rain", a song by Loona from the 2017 EP JinSoul
