= Your Love Is a Lie =

"Your Love Is A Lie"

Single by Simple Plan

from the album Simple Plan
- Released: February 28, 2008
- Length: 3:41
- Label: Lava; Atlantic
- Songwriters: Pierre Bouvier; Chuck Comeau; Arnold Lanni
- Producers: Danja; Dave Fortman

Simple Plan singles chronology
"When I'm Gone" (2007)	"Your Love Is A Lie" (2008)	"Save You" (2008)

"Your Love Is A Lie" is the second single by Canadian rock band Simple Plan from their third album Simple Plan.

== Background ==
The song's chord progressions are similar to Green Day's "Boulevard of Broken Dreams" and Oasis' "Wonderwall".

== Music video ==
The band flew to Los Angeles to shoot the music video on March 6. The video was directed/produced by Wayne Isham.

The video is a straightforward representation of the song. It intersperses shots of the band playing (later in the video, amid wind-blown blossoms) with shots of Pierre Bouvier's girlfriend, meeting (and having sex) with another man, while Bouvier, betrayed by the woman, waits in agony in his apartment. His apartment has a view of the man's apartment, with a clear view of a bedroom's window, where he sees them have sex.

== Live performances ==
The song was performed at the closing ceremony of the 2010 Winter Olympics.

== Track listing ==
All tracks are written by Simple Plan and Arnold Lanni, except where noted.

iTunes single 1
No.	Title	Length
1.	"Your Love Is a Lie" (Single edit)	3:39
2.	"Your Love Is a Lie" (Live in Germany)	4:03

iTunes single 2
No.	Title	Length
1.	"Your Love Is a Lie"	3:41
2.	"Your Love Is a Lie" (Music video)	3:44

European CD single
No.	Title	Length
1.	"Your Love Is a Lie" (Single edit)

European CD single
No.	Title	Writer(s)	Length
1.	"Your Love Is a Lie" (Explicit version)		3:43
2.	"Time to Say Goodbye" (Live in Germany)	Simple Plan	3:07

Australian CD single and iTunes EP
No.	Title	Writer(s)	Length
1.	"Your Love Is a Lie" (Explicit album version)		3:42
2.	"Time to Say Goodbye" (Live in Germany)	Simple Plan	3:10
3.	"Your Love Is a Lie" (Live in New York City)		3:46
Total length:			10:36

== Personnel ==
Personnel per Apple Music.

Simple Plan

- Chuck Comeau – drums
- David Desrosiers – background vocals, bass
- Jeff Stinco – electric guitar
- Pierre Bouvier – lead vocals
- Sébastien Lefebvre – background vocals, electric guitar

Additional musicians

- DJ Lethal – drum loop
- Danja – additional programming

== Charts ==
=== Weekly charts ===
Chart (2008)	Peak position
Australia (ARIA)	33
Austria (Ö3 Austria Top 40)	52
Belgium (Ultratip Bubbling Under Flanders)	2
Belgium (Ultratip Bubbling Under Wallonia)	10
Canada Hot 100 (Billboard)	16
Canada CHR/Top 40 (Billboard)	8
Canada Hot AC (Billboard)	5
Czech Republic Airplay (ČNS IFPI)	35
Germany (GfK)	37
Netherlands (Dutch Top 40)	17
Netherlands (Single Top 100)	88
UK Singles (OCC)	63
US Bubbling Under Hot 100 (Billboard)	3
US Pop Airplay (Billboard)	30

=== Year-end charts ===
Chart (2008)	Position
Brazil (Crowley)	74
Canada (Canadian Hot 100)	37
Canada Hot AC (Billboard)	7
