= Can't Keep My Hands off You =

2011 single by Simple Plan

"Can't Keep My Hands Off You"

Single by Simple Plan featuring Rivers Cuomo

from the album Get Your Heart On!
- Released: March 31, 2011
- Recorded: August–November 2010
- Genre: Pop-punk; alternative rock; pop rock; power pop
- Length: 3:21
- Label: Lava; Atlantic
- Songwriters: Pierre Bouvier; Chuck Comeau; Rivers Cuomo
- Producer: Brian Howes

Simple Plan singles chronology
"Save You" (2008)	"Can't Keep My Hands Off You" (2011)	"Jet Lag" (2011)

Rivers Cuomo singles chronology
"Magic" (2010)	"Can't Keep My Hands Off You" (2011)	"Sober Up" (2018)

"Can't Keep My Hands Off You" is a promotional single (and in some countries released as the first single) from Simple Plan's fourth studio album, Get Your Heart On!. The song features Weezer frontman Rivers Cuomo as a guest vocalist, and was released as a radio single on March 31, 2011, and an iTunes single on April 19, 2011. A music video was released on April 20, 2011. It was the band's first single in three years since their last single, "Save You", was released in 2008. An alternate version without Cuomo can be found on the soundtrack to the 2011 film Prom. The song was released as the second single in Australia in August 2011 and received frequent airplay.

== Promotion ==
The band performed the song on the Australian version of The X Factor on October 4, 2011.

== Chart performance ==
The song debuted and peaked at 45 on the Australian ARIA Singles Chart on October 24, 2011. In Canada, it reached number 70 on the Canadian Hot 100.

== Music video ==
A music video was shot in early April and released on April 20, 2011. The video features the band taking over a high school prom and playing outside the high school while all the students dance and cheer them. Rivers Cuomo of Weezer, who provides guest vocals on the song, is not featured in the video.

== Track listing ==
1. "Can't Keep My Hands Off You" – 3:21

== Charts ==
Chart (2011)	Peak position
Australia (ARIA)	45
Canada Hot 100 (Billboard)	70
