= Astronaut (song) =

Single by Simple Plan

from the album Get Your Heart On!
- Released: September 19, 2011
- Recorded: 2011
- Genre: Alternative rock
- Length: 3:41
- Label: Lava, Atlantic
- Songwriter(s): Pierre Bouvier; Charles Comeau; Julian Emery; Jim Irvin
- Producer(s): Simple Plan

Simple Plan singles chronology
"Jet Lag" (2011)	"Astronaut" (2011)	"Summer Paradise" (2012)

"Astronaut" is the third single from Simple Plan's fourth studio album, Get Your Heart On!. In December 2012, the song was played in Earth orbit by astronaut Chris Hadfield.

== Music video ==
The music video was directed by Mark Staubach and premiered on 19 September 2011. It was filmed in the desert of California. The clip opens with a message that read, "Being human is the most terrible loneliness in the universe" and continues to show a lone man exploring an empty space. He keeps looking around and around for something, or rather someone, to fill a void in his heart. The female lead for the clip is Caitlin O'Connor, a model/actress, who has previously played in music videos for Michael Bublé and New Found Glory.

The song was nominated in the category Best International Video by a Canadian band to 2012 MuchMusic Video Awards.

In the video, the man, played by Nick Gamez, is seen with a name tag that says P. Cunningham. The same name was used for the drunk driver in the music video for "Untitled".

== Track listing ==
1. "Astronaut" – 3:41

== Charts ==
Chart (2011—12)	Peak position
Belgium (Ultratip Bubbling Under Flanders)	68
Brazil (Brasil Hot 100 Airplay)	95
