= Harder Than It Looks =

Studio album by Simple Plan
- Released: May 6, 2022
- Recorded: 2019–2020
- Studio: Van Howes Studios
- Genre: Pop-punk
- Length: 34:35
- Label: Self-released (through The Orchard)
- Producers: Pierre Bouvier; Zakk Cervini; Brian Howes; Jason "JVP" Poederooyen

Simple Plan chronology
Taking One for the Team (2016)	Harder Than It Looks (2022)

Singles from Harder Than It Looks
- 1. "The Antidote" Released: November 5, 2021; 2. "Ruin My Life" Released: February 18, 2022; 3. "Congratulations" Released: March 15, 2022; 4. "Wake Me Up (When This Nightmare's Over)" Released: April 8, 2022; 5. "Iconic" Released: October 13, 2023

Harder Than It Looks is the sixth studio album by Canadian rock band Simple Plan, released on May 6, 2022. It is their first record in six years since Taking One for the Team (2016), their first album not on Atlantic Records, and their last album to feature any contributions by bassist David Desrosiers.

The album garnered positive reviews from critics. Harder Than It Looks spawned four singles: "The Antidote", "Ruin My Life" with Sum 41's Deryck Whibley, "Congratulations" and "Wake Me Up (When This Nightmare's Over)". To promote the record, the band toured across the United States and Southeast Asia.

== Background and production ==
The band stated that the album will be a return to their pop-punk roots. This is the band's first album to be released since the departure of longtime bassist David Desrosiers after his sexual misconduct allegations, although the band hinted in 2018 at his involvement in the recording process via Instagram. Instead of replacing Desrosiers with a new member, vocalist Pierre Bouvier took up bass guitar and the band continued as a four-piece.

== Singles and promotion ==
On November 5, 2021, Simple Plan released "The Antidote", their first single in two years. On January 5, 2022, a music video for the single was released. On February 18, the band released the album's second single "Ruin My Life", a collaboration with Sum 41's Deryck Whibley, along with an accompanying music video. On March 15, the band announced the album's May 6 release date, along with its third single "Congratulations". The album's fourth single, "Wake Me Up (When This Nightmare's Over)", was released on April 8; it was accompanied by a music video directed by Jensen Noen about the 2022 Russian invasion of Ukraine, with proceeds from the video being donated to UNICEF's Ukraine Emergency Appeal.

On May 6, 2022, the band announced a 31-city United States tour to promote the album, starting on May 10 at The Fillmore Detroit and finishing on August 28 at the Worcester Palladium, with Set It Off and Magnolia Park as supporting acts. On December 23, the band announced on Instagram that their doing a Southeast Asia leg of their tour for 2023, beginning on March 4 with a performance at Jakarta's Everblast Festival and ending on March 12 at Davao's SMX Convention Center. On March 20 of that year, the band was announced alongside Sum 41 as special guests on The Offspring's summer tour supporting their tenth album Let the Bad Times Roll.

In October 2023, over a year after the album's initial release, the band released a reversion of "Iconic", featuring Jax, along with a music video.

== Critical reception ==
Professional ratings
Review scores
Source	Rating
Distorted Sound	7/10
Kerrang!	4/5
Riff Magazine	7/10
Sputnikmusic	2.5/5
Upset	4/5 stars
Wall of Sound	9/10

Tamara May of Wall of Sound gave the album high praise for its mature delivery of the band's pop punk style of "extremely catchy melodies to lyrical themes of despair and hopelessness" while also expanding the experimental pop sound from their 2008 self-titled record, saying "Harder Than It Looks really tries its hardest to incorporate the band's strengths, while also making an attempt to be their most diverse-sounding album, and they've succeeded." She concluded that: "Our favourite Canadian pop punkers have nailed this record once again by producing their most authentic selves in their 20-year tenure, and it's sure to win over fans as much as their high school selves did." Mike DeWald of Riff Magazine wrote: "Harder Than It Looks is a continuation for a band that's stayed true to its sound from the start. Simple Plan is aging gracefully, no longer writing songs about teenage angst and rebellion; instead focusing on the better days to come." Tasha Brown of Distorted Sound wrote: "Shaking off the shackles of record labels, Simple Plan returns to their roots for ten tracks of arguably their best material since their 2008 self-titled effort."

Conversely, Jesper L. of Sputnikmusic felt the band were still "absolutely horrendous at incorporating elements of post-2005 pop", criticizing "Anxiety" and "Iconic" for "dreadfully repetitive choruses, painfully misplaced horns, and not a single hint of energy or authenticity." He backhandedly commended the album's "monotony of vaguely competent pop rock" for showcasing the band's "autopilot" musicianship of "overly simplistic yet catchy riffs, big-capital-b choruses, and some of the whiniest vocals" on "Wake Me Up (When This Nightmare's Over)", "Million Pictures of You" and "The Antidote". He concluded that: "There's nothing to the album outside of this; there's no element to draw in new listeners or keep the old ones coming back. It just kind of exists. Simple Plan just kind of exist, but then again, so do I."

== Track listing ==
Harder Than It Looks track listing
No.	Title	Length
1.	"Wake Me Up (When This Nightmare's Over)"	3:36
2.	"Ruin My Life" (featuring Deryck Whibley of Sum 41)	3:19
3.	"The Antidote"	3:16
4.	"Million Pictures of You"	3:26
5.	"Anxiety"	3:30
6.	"Congratulations"	3:17
7.	"Iconic"	3:06
8.	"Best Day of My Life"	3:27
9.	"Slow Motion"	4:00
10.	"Two"	3:38
Total length:		34:35

== Personnel ==
Credits adapted from the album's booklet.

Simple Plan

- Pierre Bouvier – lead vocals, bass guitar; piano on "Wake Me Up (When This Nightmare's Over)", additional programming, keyboards
- Chuck Comeau – drums
- Sébastien Lefebvre – rhythm guitar, backing vocals
- Jeff Stinco – lead guitar

Additional musicians

- Deryck Whibley – guest vocals ("Ruin My Life")
- David Desrosiers – bass guitar, backing vocals (2019–2020)

Production

- Pierre Bouvier – producer
- Brian Howes – producer
- Zakk Cervini – producer, mixing
- Chris Lord-Alge – mixing (track 10)
- Jason "JVP" Van Poederooyen – producer, mixing (track 6), engineering
- Ted Jensen – mastering

Design

- Chapman Baehler – album photography
- Simple Plan – art direction and concept
- Fred Jérôme – art direction and concept, layout design

== Charts ==
Chart performance for Harder Than It Looks
Chart (2022)	Peak position
Australian Albums (ARIA)	67
Austrian Albums (Ö3 Austria)	59
Canadian Albums (Billboard)	84
German Albums (Offizielle Top 100)	82
Japanese Hot Albums (Billboard Japan)	60
Swiss Albums (Schweizer Hitparade)	36
UK Album Downloads (Official Charts)	32
UK Independent Albums (Official Charts)	44
UK Rock & Metal Albums (Official Charts)	25
US Top Album Sales (Billboard)	90
