= Taking One for the Team =

Studio album by Simple Plan
- Released: February 19, 2016
- Recorded: March – November 2015
- Studios: West Valley (Woodland Hills, California); Sparky Dark (Calabasas, California)
- Genres: Pop-punk; pop rock
- Length: 46:10
- Label: Atlantic
- Producers: Howard Benson; Ryan Stewart

Simple Plan chronology
Get Your Heart On – The Second Coming! (2013)	Taking One for the Team (2016)	Harder Than It Looks (2022)

Singles from Taking One for the Team
- 1. "Boom" Released: August 28, 2015; 2. "I Don't Wanna Go to Bed" Released: October 16, 2015; 3. "Opinion Overload" Released: February 5, 2016; 4. "Singing in the Rain" Released: March 25, 2016; 5. "Perfectly Perfect" Released: September 26, 2016

Taking One for the Team is the fifth studio album by Canadian rock band Simple Plan. It was released on February 19, 2016 through Atlantic Records and represents the band's first full-length record in nearly five years. Following the release of three buzz singles in mid-2015, the band released "I Don't Wanna Go to Bed" featuring American rapper Nelly as the official lead single for the album on October 16, 2015. It debuted at number 4 on the Canadian Albums Chart, earning the band their fourth consecutive top-5 and a perfect streak of top-10s for their first five studio albums. It is the band's final album release as a quintet, as bassist David Desrosiers left Simple Plan in July 2020 due to sexual misconduct allegations. It is also the band's last album released through Atlantic, as the band fulfilled their contract to the label with this album.

== Production ==
Sessions for Taking One for the Team were held at West Valley Studios in Woodland Hills, California and Sparky Dark Studio in Calabasas, California. Howard Benson produced all of the songs, with co-production from Ryan Stewart on "Perfectly Perfect", while recording was handled by Mike Plotnikoff and Hatsukazu "Hatch" Inagaki. Paul DeCarli did digital editing, and Wendell Teague and Chris Bousquet served as assistant engineers. Neal Avron mixed the recordings, with assistance from Scott Skrzynski, at The Casita in Hollywood, California. Chris Gehringer mastered the album at Sterling Sound in New York City.

== Singles ==
"I Don't Wanna Go to Bed" was released October 16, 2015 as the album's official lead single. The song features pop and funk influences in a stylistic departure from the pop-punk and pop rock of the band's earlier work. A Baywatch-inspired music video premiered October 15, 2015 – a day before the song's digital release. It has since peaked outside the top 50 on the Canadian Hot 100 at number 54.

"Singing in the Rain" was released as second single from the album on March 25, 2016. However, the single version of the song does not feature R. City. The music video for "Singing in the Rain was released on April 12, 2016; set in the 1960s, it was a tribute to the movie That Thing You Do.

"Perfectly Perfect" was announced as the third official single on September 26, 2016.

=== Other songs ===
The first song released from the era was "Saturday" on June 22, 2015. In September 2015, drummer Chuck Comeau revealed the song would not be featured on the album.

"Boom" was released August 28, 2015 as the second promotional single after its music video premiered a day earlier.

A third buzz track, "I Don't Wanna Be Sad", was released September 18, 2015. Initially presumed to be the album's first official single, it was later announced to be a promotional track only.

The band released the album tracks steadily leading up to the release date. A music video for "Opinion Overload" was released on February 5, 2016. "Farewell" was released on February 14, followed by "I Refuse" on February 15, "Nostalgic", "P.S. I Hate You" and "Perfectly Perfect".

At the end of the album, Canadian sports announcer Bob Cole calls a fictional ice hockey game featuring Simple Plan, concluding with, "Oh my goodness, can you believe it? Just like that, Simple Plan have won the game!".

== Reception ==
Professional ratings
Aggregate scores
Source	Rating
Metacritic	65/100
Review scores
Source	Rating
AllMusic	3.5/5 stars
Kerrang!	3/5 stars
Consequence of Sound	D+

Taking One for the Team received generally favorable reviews from music critics. On Metacritic, which assigns a normalized rating out of 100 to reviews from mainstream critics, the album received an average score of 65 based on 4 reviews, indicating "generally favorable reviews".

Neil Z. Yeung of AllMusic called the record "pure, no-frills, feel-good fun, a start-to-finish crowd-pleaser for fans of that classic pop-punk sound." He concluded about the band's musical stance they made with their album: "When music is presented this directly, and after so many years holding firm to a particular style, it's hard to root against them […] Simple Plan -- whose members were in their late thirties at the time of recording -- are the comeback underdog team, winning whether critics like it or not." Collin Brennan of Consequence of Sound commended the band for their longevity and continuation to deliver "earnest sentimentalism" through "heavy music for people who don't like heavy music" but was heavily critical towards their attempts at different soundscapes on "Singing in the Rain" and "I Don't Wanna Go to Bed", concluding that "[W]hen their punches land, you want to bless these guys for sticking to their guns and not growing up. But the misses are real and painful, and they make Taking One For the Team a far more embarrassing listen than it needed to be."

== Track listing ==
All writing credits per booklet.

No.	Title	Writer(s)	Length
1.	"Opinion Overload"	Simple Plan; Nathaniel Company	3:19
2.	"Boom!"	Simple Plan; Ryan Ogren; Nick Bailey	3:10
3.	"Kiss Me Like Nobody's Watching"	Simple Plan	3:22
4.	"Farewell" (featuring Jordan Pundik of New Found Glory)	Simple Plan; Ogren; Bailey	3:21
5.	"Singing in the Rain" (featuring R. City)	Simple Plan; Theron Thomas; Timothy Thomas	3:42
6.	"Everything Sucks"	Simple Plan	3:31
7.	"I Refuse"	Simple Plan	3:18
8.	"I Don't Wanna Go to Bed" (featuring Nelly)	Simple Plan; Christopher J. Baran; Comell Haynes	3:08
9.	"Nostalgic"	Simple Plan; Company	3:06
10.	"Perfectly Perfect"	Simple Plan; Ryan Stewart; Tom Higgenson	3:07
11.	"I Don't Wanna Be Sad"	Simple Plan	3:13
12.	"P.S. I Hate You"	Simple Plan; Stewart	3:03
13.	"Problem Child"	Simple Plan; Justin Tranter	3:41
14.	"I Dream About You" (featuring Juliet Simms)	Simple Plan	4:12

Bonus tracks

French bonus track
No.	Title	Writer(s)	Length
15.	"I Don't Wanna Go to Bed" (featuring Nelly) (French version)	Simple Plan; Baran; Haynes	3:08

Japanese bonus tracks
No.	Title	Length
15.	"Summer Paradise" (live)
16.	"I'd Do Anything" (live)

== Personnel ==
Personnel per booklet.

Simple Plan

- Pierre Bouvier – lead vocals, backing vocals
- Chuck Comeau – drums, backing vocals
- David Desrosiers – bass, backing vocals
- Sebastien Lefebvre – rhythm guitars, backing vocals
- Jeff Stinco – lead guitars, backing vocals

Additional musicians

- Lenny Skolnik – programming, keyboards, additional backing vocals
- Howard Benson – Hammond B3, Vox Continental
- Jonny Litten – additional backing vocals
- Chady Awad – additional backing vocals
- Melanie Fontana – additional backing vocals
- Sidnie Tipton – additional backing vocals
- Myah Langston – additional backing vocals
- Jordan Pundik – guest vocals (track 4)
- Nelly – guest vocals (track 8)
- Juliet Simms – guest vocals (track 14)
- R. City – guest vocals (track 5)
- Bob Cole – play-by-play announcer

Production and design

- Howard Benson – producer
- Neal Avron – mixing
- Mike Plotnikoff – recording
- Hatsukazu "Hatch" Inagaki – recording
- Paul DeCarli – digital editing
- Gersh – drum technician
- Marc VanGool – guitar technician
- Wendell Teague – assistant engineer
- Chris Bousquet – assistant engineer
- Scott Skrzynski – mixing assistant
- Chris Gehringer – mastering
- Ryan Stewart – co-producer (track 10)
- Chapman Baehler – album photography
- Simple Plan – art direction, concept
- Fred Jérôme – art direction, concept, layout design

== Charts ==
Chart performance for Taking One for the Team
Chart (2016)	Peak position
Australian Albums (ARIA)	12
Austrian Albums (Ö3 Austria)	18
Belgian Albums (Ultratop Flanders)	45
Belgian Albums (Ultratop Wallonia)	105
Canadian Albums (Billboard)	4
Dutch Albums (Album Top 100)	59
German Albums (Offizielle Top 100)	30
Japanese Albums (Oricon)	21
Scottish Albums (Official Charts)	37
Spanish Albums (Promusicae)	11
Swiss Albums (Schweizer Hitparade)	10
UK Albums (Official Charts)	44
UK Rock & Metal Albums (Official Charts)	4
US Billboard 200	94
US Top Rock Albums (Billboard)	15
