= Kotak (band) =

Indonesian rock band

Kotak Band
- Origin: Jakarta, Indonesia
- Genres: Rock; pop rock; hard rock
- Years active: 2004–present
- Labels: Warner Music Indonesia
- Members: Tantri Syalindri Ichlasari (Vocals); Swasti "Chua" Sabdastantri (Bass); Mario "Cella" Marcella (Guitars); Gilang "Gilang NR" Nanda Raharja (Drums); Asep "Silet" Sujarno (Guitars)
- Past members: Julia Angelia "Pare" Lepar (Vocals); Prinzes "Icez" Amanda (Bass); Haposan "Posan" Haryanto Tobing (Drums); Qotrunnada "Qoqo" Fitriana (Guitar)

Kotak (lit.: "Square") is a rock band from Jakarta, Indonesia, formed in 2004 through a talent competition "The Dream Band". The band currently consists of vocalist Tantri Syalindri Ichlasari, bassist Swasti "Chua" Sabdastantri, and guitarist Mario "Cella" Marcella. The band's name, "Kotak", represented four different characteristics of its first formation members that were bound by music.

== History ==
=== Early years ===
Kotak was formed by vocalist Julia Angelia "Pare" Lepar, bassist Prinzes "Icez" Amanda, guitarist Mario "Cella" Marcella, drummer Haposan "Posan" Haryanto Tobing and guitarist Qotrunnada "Qoqo" Fitriana on 27 September 2004 after they won TV7 (Indonesia)'s "The Dream Band" 2004 talent competition. At the audition they met Dody Isnaini, a bassist from Kahitna, who became their producer. That year the band started working on their first album, the eponymous Kotak, which was launched under Warner Music Indonesia in 2005.

Kotak album consists of 10 songs, including "Hilang", "Terbang", "Damai Hati", and "Kau Pilih Dia". Three years later, the band released a new album titled Kotak Kedua, that garnered critical acclaim in Indonesia and Malaysia. It consists of 12 songs, including hits such as "Beraksi", "Masih Cinta" and "Tinggalkan Saja". The third album Energi was released in 2010, the record Energi Repackage in 2011 and the group's fifth album Terbaik in 2012 followed by KFC Adu Bintang in 2013.

=== Formation changes ===
In 2007, vocalist Pare and bassist Icez left the band. Shortly thereafter, the lead vocalist's position was filled by a female singer Tantri Syalindri, and Swasti "Chua" Sabdastantri replaced Icez on bass. The band members changed once more after their drummer, Posan, left in 2011. The band released a second successful album titled Kotak Kedua in 2008. A piece of it was converted into a ringback tone which has been downloaded more than a million times as of 2013. ("Energi: Tendangan Dari Langit", "Energy: Kicks from the Sky").

In 2009, the band won "Best Rock Band/Group" and "Best Rock Album" at the 2009 Anugerah Musik Indonesia. They also won "Best Duo/Group Newcomer" at the 2009 Anugerah Planet Muzik, and "Most Favorite Breakthrough Artist" at the 2009 MTV Indonesia Awards. In the end of the year, Kotak released its new single, "Pelan-Pelan Saja," which was included in their third album, Energi, released in November 2010.

In 2011, Kotak teamed up with Simple Plan to record a new version of their song, "Jet Lag". The band has performed in many countries. The Jakarta Post stated: "One of Indonesia's most loved rock bands, Kotak, has just released its Best album, containing nine of the most popular tracks from the band's previous albums, three new songs and a bonus track." The song "Jet Lag", produced with Canadian pop-punk band Simple Plan, is also available in this album. The album has sold 200,000 copies.

=== Tour to Singapore and the US, and "Jagalah Bumi" ===
The group was invited to perform in Singapore, at an event called Muzik FM, organised by Superstar & Legends and Raistar Entertainment. On 9 June 2013, Kotak held a concert in the US for the first time. They performed in three American cities: Washington, New York, and Los Angeles. Their departure to the US was a reward of their victory at the Indonesian music event Soundrenaline in 2012.

On 7 May 2015, the band released new single "Jagalah Bumi". It was used as the theme song of the third season of Malaysian animated series BoBoiBoy.

== Band members ==
=== Current members ===
- Mario "Cella" Marcella – guitars (2004–present)
- Tantri Syalindri Ichlasari – vocals (2007–present)
- Swasti "Chua" Sabdastantri – bass guitar (2008–present)
- Gilang "Gilang NR" Nanda Raharja – drums (2009-present)
- Asep "Silet" Sujarno – guitar (2017–present)

=== Former members ===
- Julia Angelia "Pare" Lepar – vocals (2004–2007)
- Prinzes "Icez" Amanda – bass guitar (2004–2007)
- Haposan "Posan" Haryanto Tobing – drums (2004–2011)
- Qotrunnada "Qoqo" Fitriana – guitars (2004–2012)

== Discography ==
=== Studio albums ===
Title	Album details	Sales
Kotak	Released: June 2005; Label: Warner Music Indonesia; Format: CD	—
Kotak Kedua	Released: 10 June 2008; Label: Warner Music Indonesia; Formats: CD, digital download	—
Energi	Released: 24 August 2010; Label: Warner Music Indonesia; Formats: CD, digital download	—
Energi (Repackaged)	Released: 29 September 2011; Label: Warner Music Indonesia; Formats: CD, digital download	—
Never Dies	Released: 24 February 2014; Label: Warner Music Indonesia; Formats: CD, digital download	5,000+ (Note: Total album sales upon one week released.)
Long Live Kotak	Released: 1 December 2016; Label: Warner Music Indonesia; Formats: CD, digital download	—
Identitas	Released: 25 September 2020; Label: Warner Music Indonesia; Format: digital download	—
18+ (EP)	Released: 9 June 2022; Label: Warner Music Indonesia; Format: digital download	—

=== Compilation albums ===
Title	Album details	Sales	Certifications
Terbaik	Released: 11 October 2012; Label: Warner Music Indonesia; Formats: CD, digital download	—	—
KFC Adu Bintang (with Various Artists)	Released: 14 January 2013; Label: Music Factory Indonesia; Format: CD	—	—
Rock N Love (Soundtrack album)	Released: 16 December 2014; Label: Warner Music Indonesia; Formats: CD, digital download	120,000+	ASIRI: 9× Platinum

=== Collaborations ===
Song title	Year	Album	Album artist	Ref.
"Jet Lag" (featuring Kotak)	2011	Get Your Heart On! (Indonesia Tour Edition)	Simple Plan	
"Cinta Itu Adalah" (featuring Kotak)	2014	Piyu	Piyu	

== Awards and nominations ==
Year	Award	Category	Work/Nominee	Result	Ref.
2009	12th Indonesian Music Awards	Best Rock Band/Group	"Beraksi"	Won	
2009	12th Indonesian Music Awards	Best Rock Album	Kotak Kedua	Won	
2009	2009 Anugerah Planet Muzik	Best Duo/Group Newcomer	"Beraksi"	Won	
2009	2009 Anugerah Planet Muzik	Best Duo/Group	Kotak Kedua	Nominated	
2009	2009 Anugerah Planet Muzik	Best Album	Kotak Kedua	Nominated	
2009	2009 Anugerah Planet Muzik	Favourite Indonesian Artist	Kotak	Nominated	
2009	2009 MTV Indonesia Awards	Most Favorite Breakthrough Artist	"Beraksi"	Won	

== See also ==
- List of Indonesian rock bands
