= Jet Lag (song) =

2011 single by Simple Plan

Single by Simple Plan featuring Natasha Bedingfield

from the album Get Your Heart On!
- Released: April 25, 2011
- Recorded: 2010
- Genre: Pop-punk; pop rock; power pop
- Length: 3:25
- Label: Lava; Atlantic
- Songwriters: Pierre Bouvier; Chuck Comeau; Nolan Sipe; Ryan Petersen
- Producer: Brian Howes

Simple Plan singles chronology
"Can't Keep My Hands off You" (2011)	"Jet Lag" (2011)	"Astronaut" (2011)

Natasha Bedingfield singles chronology
"Strip Me" (2010)	"Jet Lag" (2011)	"Easy" (2011)

Music video
- "Jet Lag" on YouTube

Marie-Mai singles chronology
"C'est moi" (2009/11)	"Jet Lag" (2011)	"Sans Cri Ni Haine" (2012)

Alternate covers
- French version

"Jet Lag" is a song by Canadian rock band Simple Plan. It was released on April 25, 2011, as the second single from their fourth studio album Get Your Heart On!. Coeur de Pirate co-wrote the song with Simple Plan and a demo was recorded with her voice.

Four official versions exist, one featuring British singer Natasha Bedingfield providing guest vocals in English, one entirely in French featuring French-Canadian singer Marie-Mai providing guest vocals; a version with the guest vocals in Chinese featuring Chinese pop singer Kelly Cha, and another version in English featuring Kotak lead vocalist Tantri Syalindri.

== Critical reception ==
In a review in the Entertainment Weekly magazine, the song received a "B+" rating. The review commented that the song is a "surprisingly lovely pop-punk pounder about intercontinental relationships." Joe DeAndrea from AbsolutePunk said that "Jet Lag is Simple Plan's first big single in a long time, almost in vein of No Pads' "I'd Do Anything." Not as rocking, but packs the same similar punch." Davey Boy from Sputnikmusic was also positive, saying that "English pop songstress Natasha Bedingfield fares best with the call and response vocals of 'Jet Lag' making for an effective radio pop-rocker that plies the oft-used theme of long-distance relationships."

== Music video ==
The music video for "Jet Lag" was directed by the band's frequent collaborator Frank Borin and filmed at Toronto Sheraton Gateway Hotel and Toronto Pearson International Airport and released on May 4, 2011. In the video, the band performs within the airport. In addition, lead singer Pierre Bouvier and Natasha Bedingfield play a long-distance relationship couple, with Pierre passing through the airport & Natasha anxiously waiting for his return in a hotel. After Pierre mails Natasha a postcard from Chicago (the music video's implied setting), he boards a flight, presumably to see her. While WestJet is the airline that prominently features in the video, an Air Canada Boeing 777 is seen taking off at the ending. Two SkyTeam airlines are also featured; a KLM Boeing 747-400 is seen landing at the beginning while the tailfin of a Korean Air Boeing 777 is visible at the 2:04 mark.

The band also released a version with the guest vocals in Mandarin Chinese featuring Chinese pop star Kelly Cha.

Another music video for Jet Lag which features Tantri Sylandri of Kotak at Jakarta, Indonesia and one with Marie Mai Bouchard replacing Natasha Bedingfield in the French version.

== Versions ==
As well as the two main versions featuring either Natasha Bedingfield or Marie-Mai, there have been many other versions performed live with other artists.

Simple Plan performed Jet Lag live with Fefe Dobson at the 2011 MuchMusic Video Awards on June 19, 2011.

On September 29, 2011, Australian singer Vanessa Amorosi sang the female lines at the AFL Footy Show Grand Final which was held at Rod Laver Arena in Melbourne, Australia.

During Simple Plan's Australian Tour in 2011, Jenna McDougall from Australian punk rock band Tonight Alive was featured in Jet Lag, as Tonight Alive were Simple Plan's support band.

A version with Chinese singer Kelly Cha was also released on December 27, 2011, with Kelly Cha providing guest vocals in Chinese.

Another version with Indonesian band Kotak's lead vocalist Tantri was also released on December 29, 2011, with Tantri providing guest vocals in English, but had only been uploaded in Warner Music Indonesia's YouTube channel.

A demo version was also released with Coeur de Pirate providing guest vocals.

Other live versions have been performed with Christina Parie, Chantal Kreviazuk, My Tam, and Saidah Baba Talibah.

During Simple Plan's "Bigger Than You Think" tour in 2025, LØLØ, one of the supporting acts, sang the female lines

== Track listings ==
Digital download - Single

1. "Jet Lag" (featuring Natasha Bedingfield) – 3:25
2. "Jet Lag" (featuring Marie-Mai) – 3:24

Digital download - Single feat. Kelly Cha version

1. "Jet Lag" (feat. Kelly Cha) – 3:22

== Charts ==
=== Weekly charts ===
Chart (2011)	Peak position
Australia (ARIA)	8
Belgium (Ultratip Bubbling Under Flanders)	39
Belgium (Ultratop 50 Wallonia)	47
Canada Hot 100 (Billboard)	11
Canada AC (Billboard)	28
Canada CHR/Top 40 (Billboard)	7
Canada Hot AC (Billboard)	6
France (SNEP)	11
Germany (GfK)	59
Netherlands (Dutch Top 40)	19
Netherlands (Single Top 100)	81
Mexico (Billboard Ingles Airplay)	8
Japan Hot 100 (Billboard)	14
Philippines (Myx)	4
Switzerland (Schweizer Hitparade)	54
US Adult Pop Airplay (Billboard)	25

=== Year-end charts ===
Chart (2011)	Position
Australia (ARIA)	60
Canada (Canadian Hot 100)	37

== Certifications ==
Region	Certification	Certified units/sales
Australia (ARIA)	2× Platinum	140,000^{^}
Canada (Music Canada)	2× Platinum	160,000^{‡}
^{^} Shipments figures based on certification alone.^{‡} Sales+streaming figures based on certification alone.

== Release history ==
Region	Date	Format
United States	April 25, 2011	Digital download, CD single
Canada	April 25, 2011	Digital download, CD single
United States	August 16, 2011	Mainstream radio
Indonesia	December 28, 2011	
Malaysia	January 26, 2012	
