= Reset (Canadian band) =

Canadian punk rock band

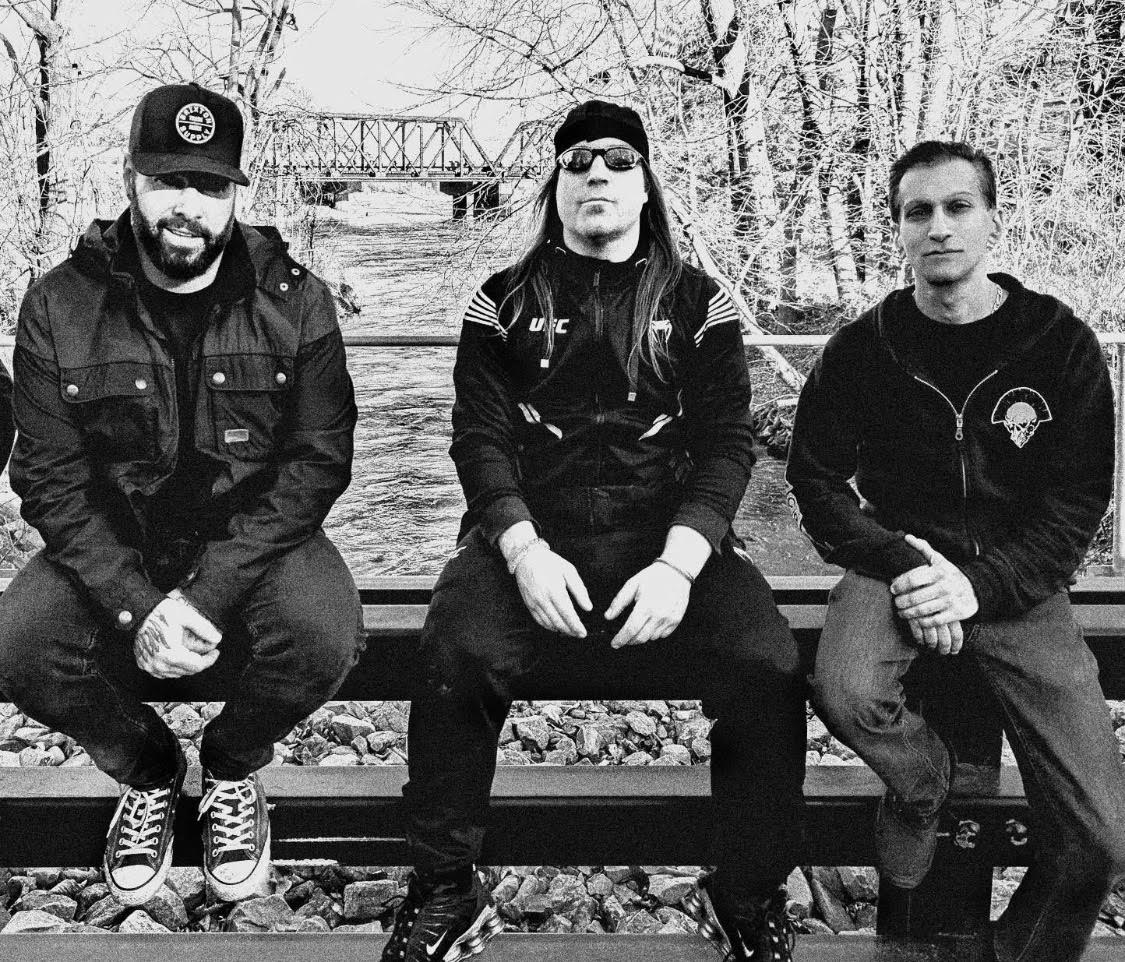
- Philippe Jolicoeur, Pat L Leclerc, Gopal, Devanathan in May 2026

Background information
- Origin: Montreal, Quebec, Canada
- Genres: Punk rock; skate punk; pop-punk; alternative rock
- Years active: 1993–present
- Labels: Cruzar Media; 2112; Indy
- Spinoffs: Simple Plan
- Members: Philippe Jolicoeur; Pat Leclerc; Gopal Devanathan
- Past members: Pierre Bouvier; Chuck Comeau; Jean-Sébastien Boileau; David Desrosiers; Dave Barbaccia; Cédrik Paquin; Martin Gendreau; Zenab Jaber; Gilbert Vallerand

Reset is a Canadian punk rock band formed in 1993 in Montreal, Quebec. The band was originally founded by Pierre Bouvier and Chuck Comeau when they were just 13 years old. Originally known as Roach, they changed their name to Reset after discovering another Canadian band already used that moniker.

Comeau left in 1998 to pursue his studies, followed by Bouvier in 1999; the two eventually reunited to form the band Simple Plan. David Desrosiers, who replaced Bouvier in Reset, also left shortly after to join them. Philippe Jolicoeur has remained the sole consistent member and frontman since the band's inception.

== History ==
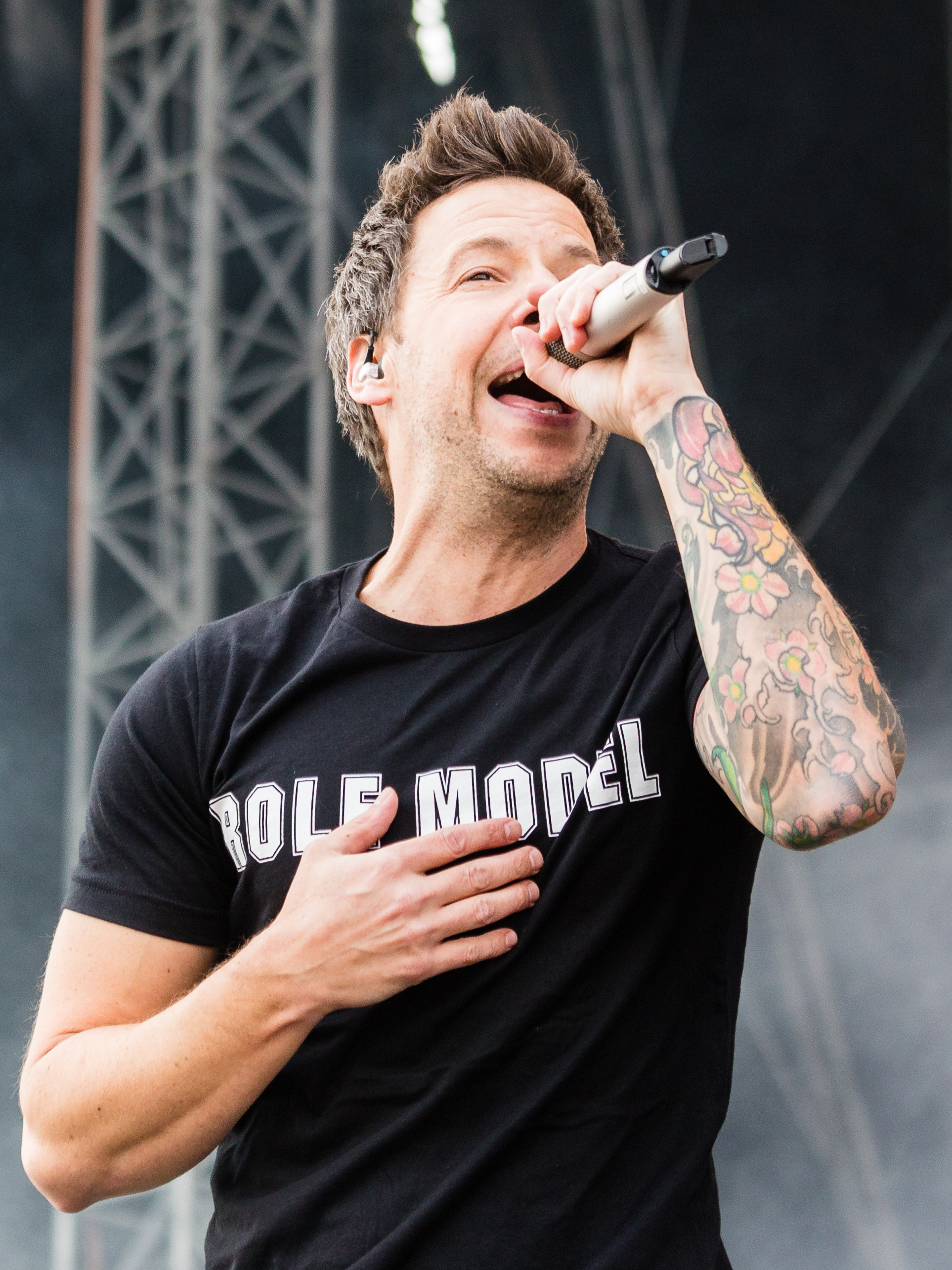
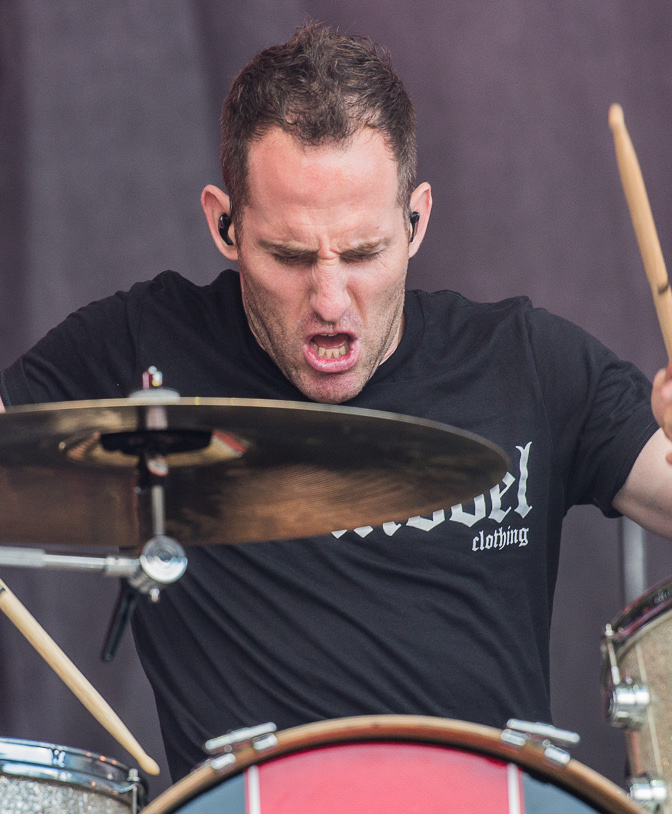
Pierre Bouvier and Chuck Comeau formed the band Reset in 1993 when they were 13 years old

Reset was formed in 1993 by Pierre Bouvier and Chuck Comeau when they were 13 years old. The original band members were Pierre Bouvier (vocals), Philippe Jolicoeur (guitar and vocals), Chuck Comeau (drums), and Jean-Sébastien Boileau (bass). The original name for the band was Roach, but as another Canadian band was using this name, the band members decided to change theirs to Reset.

The band's first full-length album, No Worries, released in 1997, was recorded at the famous "Le Studio Morin-Heights" and produced by Rod Shearer. The studio was best known for producing beloved Canadian rock band - Rush, Quebec pop sensation - Celine Dion, and international mega artists such as April Wine, The Police, David Bowie, and many more. Even Aussie punk rock heavyweights - Bodyjar recorded their third album No Touch Red at the studio.The band shot a video clip for the single "Why?". In 1998, the band lineup changed. Bouvier took Boileau's place in playing bass and a new member, Adrian White from Vancouver, replaced Comeau as drummer after a conflict between Bouvier and Comeau (see song "Friend" – 1999).

(L–R): Philippe Jolicoeur and Desrosiers performing in 1999

In 1999, the band released No Limits, which was co-written by Adrian White. This album was recorded in Vancouver, British Columbia, and was produced by Greg Reely. Three video clips were filmed for No Limits: "Pollution", "Pressure", and "My Dream and I". Shortly after the filming of "Pressure", Bouvier left Reset to reacquaint with Comeau and form Simple Plan. David Desrosiers replaced Bouvier in 2000 but only stayed with the band for six months, being recruited by Simple Plan members to fill their bass spot.

In 2003, Reset released a third album, Radioactive. The album was produced, performed, mixed and mastered by Philippe Jolicoeur. This is the first album that Phil produced with his own record label, Indy Rekordz Inc. "Choke" and "Kyoto" are the singles and the new video clips for that album. On "Kyoto", Reset speaks about Kyoto Protocol.

In March 2008, they released their fourth album No Intensity. This album is similar to their first album No Worries, with anti-government songs like "Corrupted To The Bone", "Redemption", and "Papillon". The latter song is based on the book Papillon by Henri Charrière, an autobiography relating Charrière's numerous imprisonments and escapes from French penal colonies. The single for this album is the song "No Intensity". The album is produced by Rod Shearer, who also produced No Worries and the band's demo CD Concerned.

Over the years Reset participated in five Canadian tours and three American tours, the 1997, 2000 and 2006 Vans Warped Tour in North America. Reset has played with bands such as Green Day, MxPx, NOFX, Pennywise, Millencolin, Lagwagon, Face to Face, Strung Out, and Ten Foot Pole.

In March 2009, the band performed a special show with their original line-up for Musique Plus's (French Much Music) punk rock show 1-2-3 Punk! 10th anniversary. They played with GrimSkunk, The Sainte Catherines, Vulgaires Machins, The Planet Smashers, and Subb.

Phil Jolicoeur stated the band planned to release a new album in summer 2012. The album, named The Antidote, was later released in November 2012 through Cruzar Media. The band did perform at two consecutive Amnesia Rockfest in June 2014 and June 2015. In June 2014, it was the original lineup that played. However, due to paternal duties, Jean-Sébastien Boileau did not perform, and David Desrosiers performed the set on the Budweiser Stage at the same time as Megadeth and Meshuggah. In June 2015, the band played just before Propagandhi's set on the Thursday evening called Fuck The Sponsors Night with the new lineup. The band released its latest album No Resistance in the spring of 2021.

In December 2024, Reset is slated to release their seventh studio album entitled Seven under Indy Rekordz owned by Reset frontman, Phil Joliceour. The new album is mixed, mastered, by Vincent Coté whom also performed the in studio drums towards all tracks on the full length. The new album is co-written by Phil Joliceour and guitarist Jay Ridge (Unemployed) circa 1997–2001 and also features several singles such as "Paranoid in Paradise" mixed and mastered by Dean Hajichristou of Epitaph Records, Parkway Drive, Protest the Hero, Obey the Brave. A francophone version of the single mixed by Vincent Cote is due to play across Quebec radio stations in 2025, while the original album single will reach international and satellite stations such as Sirius FM. Reset's current line-up retains their veteran drummer Gopal Devanathan (2015–present), along with the introduction of guitarist Jay Ridge (2022–present) and Pat Leclerc (2024–present) on bass whom has previous perform live with the original members of the band at Rockfest in Montebello, Quebec, Canada.

== Band members ==
Current

- Philippe Jolicoeur – lead vocals, guitar (1993–present)
- Pat Leclerc - bass, vocals (2024–present)
- Gopal Devanathan - drums (2015–present)

Former

- Pierre Bouvier – lead vocals (1993–1999), bass (1998–1999)
- Chuck Comeau – drums (1993–1998)
- Jean-Sébastien Boileau – bass (1993–1998)
- David Desrosiers – lead vocals, bass (1999–2000)
- Dave Barbaccia – bass, vocals (2004–2005)
- Martin Gendreau – drums (2005–2010)
- Matt Kapuszczak – guitar, vocals (2010–2012)
- Julien Bédard – bass (2010–2011)
- Justin Brandreth- bass (2011–2012)
- Adrian White – drums, guitar, keyboards, samples, backing vocals (1998–2001) (2010–2013)
- Cédrik Paquin - bass (2015–2016)
- Claude Plamondon - bass (2016–2017; 2022–2024)
- Zenab Jaber- bass (2018–2019)
- Gilbert Vallerand - bass (2019–2022)

== Discography ==
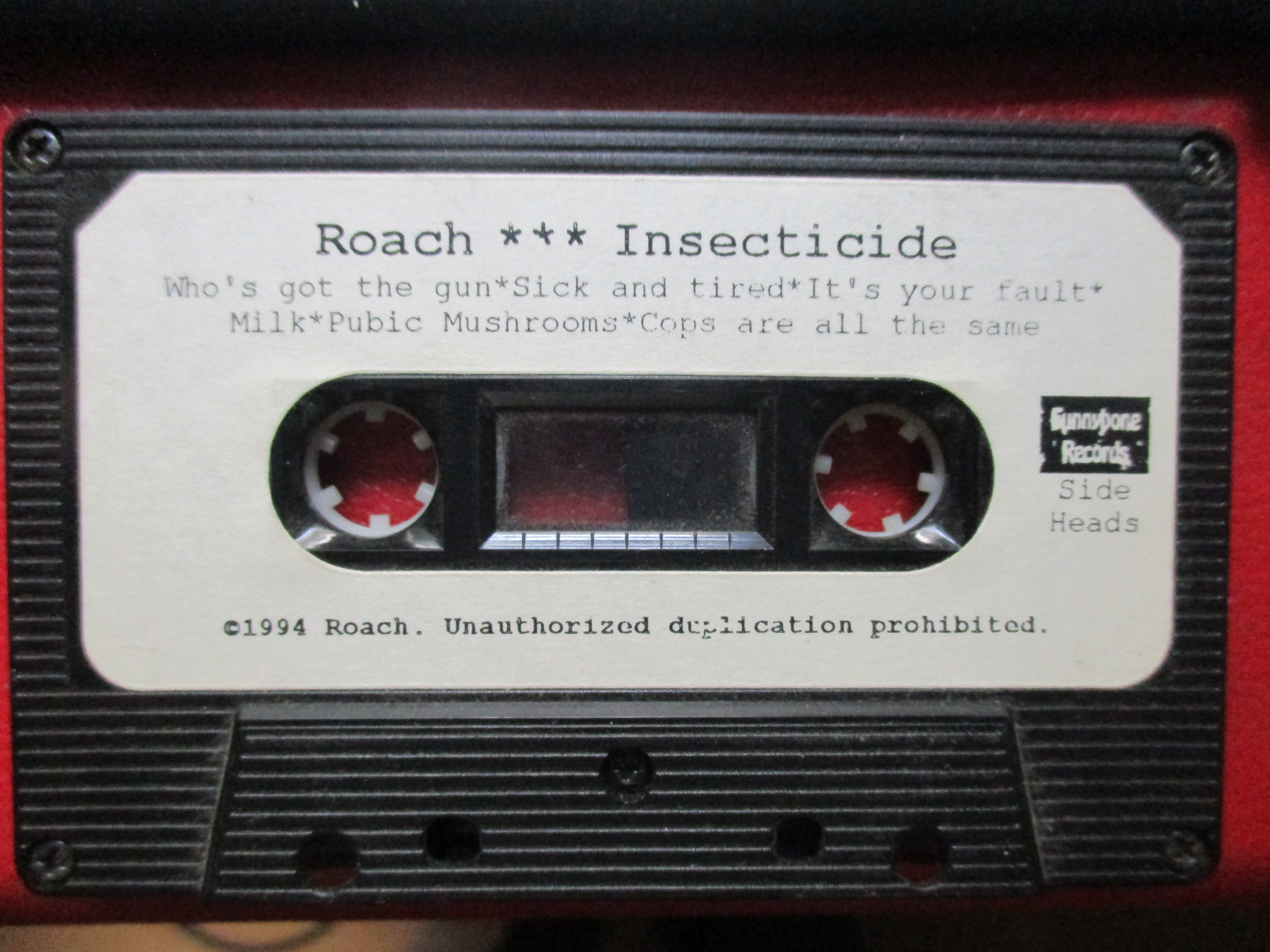
Roach Cassette Demo (1994)

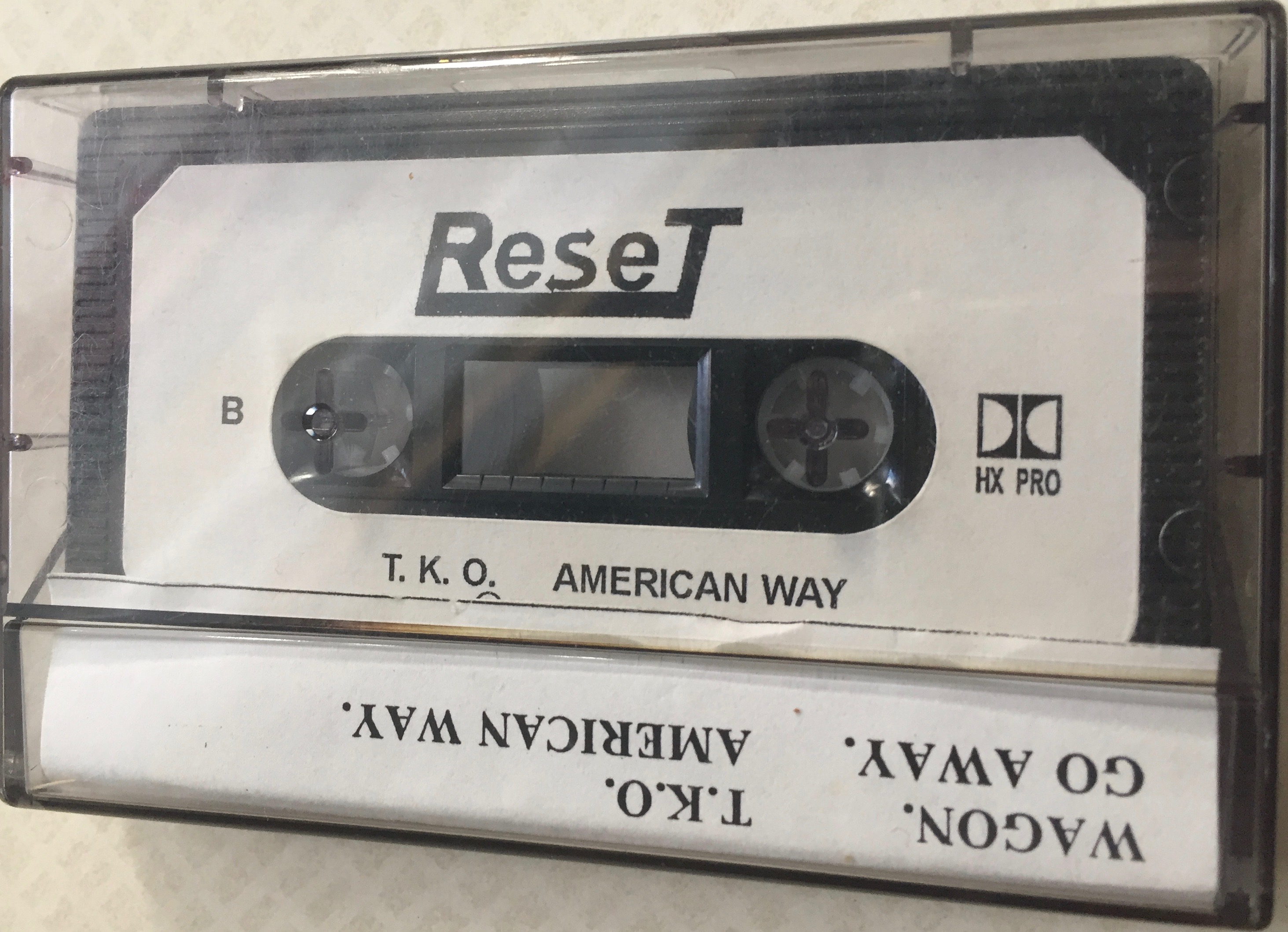
First Reset Demo (1995)

=== Studio albums ===
- No Worries (1997)
- No Limits (1999)
- Radioactive (2003)
- No Intensity (2008)
- The Antidote (2013)
- No Resistance (2021)
- Seven (2024)

=== Demo tapes ===
- Insecticide (as Roach) (1994)
- Concerned (1995)

=== Compilations ===
- No Worries / No Limits (2006)

=== Singles ===
- Paranoid in Paradise (2024)
- One Last Chance (2024)
- Help (Beatles Cover) (2024)
- Believers & Deceivers (2024)
