= Singing in the Rain (Simple Plan song) =

Single by Simple Plan

from the album Taking One for the Team
- Released: March 25, 2016
- Genre: Pop rock; reggae rock
- Length: 3:29
- Label: Atlantic
- Songwriters: Pierre Bouvier; Chuck Comeau
- Producer: Howard Benson

Simple Plan singles chronology
| "I Don't Wanna Go to Bed" (2016) | "Singing in the Rain" (2016) | "Perfectly Perfect" (2016) |

R.City singles chronology
| "Make Up" (2015) | "Singing in the Rain" (2016) | "Don't You Need Somebody" (2016) |

Music video
- "Singing in the Rain" on YouTube

"Singing in the Rain" is a song by Canadian rock band Simple Plan from their fifth studio album, Taking One for the Team (2016). On the album, American musical duo Rock City are featured on the track, with an additional verse written by the duo's Timothy and Theron Thomas, however the single version does not include this feature. The solo Simple Plan version of "Singing in the Rain" was released to digital retailers on March 25, 2016 as the album's third official single.

== Music video ==
The accompanying music video was directed by Mark Staubach and pays homage to the 1996 film, That Thing You Do!. It premiered on April 12, 2016. Set in 1964, the video seeks to depict the positive and negative aspects of the life of a musician, and "the exhilarating power that 3 chords, a drum beat and a catchy melody can have on the lives of the people who create it", according to a statement from the band.

== Track listings ==
Album version
| No. | Title | Writer(s) | Length |
|---|---|---|---|
| 5. | "Singing in the Rain" (featuring Rock City) | Pierre Bouvier; Charles-André Comeau; Timothy Thomas; Theron Thomas | 3:42 |

Single version
| No. | Title | Writer(s) | Length |
|---|---|---|---|
| 1. | "Singing in the Rain" | Bouvier; Comeau | 3:29 |

== Credits and personnel ==
Credits are adapted from the digital liner notes at AllMusic.

- Neal Avron – mixing
- Chady Awad – background vocals
- Howard Benson – organ, production
- Chris Bousquet – assistant engineer
- Pierre Bouvier – lead vocals, background vocals, songwriting
- Chuck Comeau – drums, background vocals, songwriting
- David Desrosiers – bass, background vocals
- Melanie Fontana – background vocals
- Chris Gehringer – mastering
- Gersh – technician
- Hatsukazu Inagaki – recording
- Myah Langston – background vocals
- Sébastien Lefebvre – guitar, background vocals
- Jonny Litten – keyboards, background vocals
- Mike Plotnikoff – recording
- Lenny Skolnik – keyboards, background vocals
- Scott Skrzynski – mixing engineer
- Jeff Stinco – guitar, background vocals
- Wendell Teague – assistant engineer
- Theron Thomas – composition (Note: Theron Thomas is only a co-writer/composer on the album version of the song.)
- Timothy Thomas – composition (Note: Timothy Thomas is only a co-writer/composer on the album version of the song.)
- Sidnie Tipton – background vocals
- Marc VanGool – technician

== Chart performance ==
| Chart (2016) | Peak position |
|---|---|
| Canada AC (Billboard) | 40 |
| US Adult Pop Airplay (Billboard) | 27 |

== Release history ==
| Country | Date | Format | Label | Ref. |
|---|---|---|---|---|
| Worldwide (Note: "Singing in the Rain" was released as a digital single without the Rock City feature in all territories except the United States.) | March 25, 2016 | Digital download | Atlantic | |
| Italy | April 29, 2016 | Mainstream radio | Warner | |
