= Get Your Heart On! =

Studio album by Simple Plan
- Released: 21 June 2011
- Recorded: August–November 2010
- Genres: Pop-punk; power pop; pop rock; alternative rock
- Length: 37:45
- Label: Atlantic
- Producer: Brian Howes

Simple Plan chronology
Simple Plan (2008)	Get Your Heart On! (2011)	Get Your Heart On – The Second Coming! (2013)

Singles from Get Your Heart On!
- 1. "Can't Keep My Hands off You" Released: 31 March 2011; 2. "Jet Lag" Released: 25 April 2011; 3. "Astronaut" Released: 19 September 2011; 4. "Summer Paradise" Released: 28 February 2012

Get Your Heart On! is the fourth studio album by Canadian rock band Simple Plan, released on 21 June 2011. In some countries such as Australia and the Netherlands, the album was released on 17 June 2011.

== Background and production ==
Simple Plan released their self-titled third album in February 2008. It was promoted with various TV appearances and tours of the US, Canada, Europe and South American, ending with several festival performances in Canada in July 2009. By September, the band begun working on a new album, writing material in Los Angeles, California. They took a brief break, before returning to writing in January 2010. In June, the group appeared on the Bamboozle Road Show 2010, before playing a handful of shows between July and September in China, Canada, Austria and Italy.

On 27 November 2010, Melodic reported that the band had finished recording.

== Composition ==
The album's title, Get Your Heart On!, is a dick joke, alluding to an erection. Musically, its sound has been described as pop rock, and drew comparison to Infinity on High-era Fall Out Boy, as well as the work of Blink-182 and Good Charlotte. The album features collaborations with other artists, including Weezer's Rivers Cuomo (on "Can't Keep My Hands Off You"), singer Natasha Bedingfield (on "Jet Lag"), Alex Gaskarth of All Time Low (on "Freaking Me Out") and rapper K'naan (on "Summer Paradise").

Get Your Heart On! opens with the pop-punk song "You Suck at Love", which discusses past lovers. "Can't Keep My Hands Off You" evoked the sound of Raditude-era Weezer. The pop rock "Jet Lag" recalled the No Pads, No Helmets...Just Balls track "I'd Do Anything", and is followed by the arena rock number "Astronaut". "Loser of the Year" is a power pop song in style of Weezer. The dance-rock "Freaking Me Out" utilizes drum machines, and is followed by the reggae-influenced "Summer Paradise", which was compared to Gym Class Heroes. The closing track "This Song Saved My Life" was reminiscent of the closing songs from their first time albums: "Perfect" and "Untitled". Its lyrics consist of messages from their fans, and incorporates some of their voices. The bonus track "Never Should Have Let You Go" dates back to 2006, when the group were working on material for their third album.

== Release and promotion ==
On 4 March 2011, the group's next untitled album was announced for release in June. "Can't Keep My Hands Off You" was released as a single on 30 March. Preceded by a behind-the-scenes video on 6 April, a music video was released for the track on 19 April. "Jet Lag" was released as a single on 25 April in both English and French versions. Two days later, the album's title was announced as Get Your Heart On!, which was followed by the track listing on 29 April. A music video was released for "Jet Lag" on 4 May, directed by Frank Borin. "Freaking Me Out" was made available for streaming through Alternative Press' website on 3 June. Get Your Heart On! was made available for streaming on 18 June, before being released on 21 June through major label Atlantic Records. Its cover artwork features a teenager's room decorated with posters of the band. A music video was released for "Astronaut" on 19 September, directed by Mark Staubach.

A music video was released for "Summer Paradise" on 12 December, directed by Staubach; it featured footage from the group's Australian tour. Two days after, an Indonesian version was made featuring collaborations from Kotak lead vocalist Tantri. A version of "Summer Paradise" featuring Sean Paul was released on 17 February. A music video was released for the Paul version of "Summer Paradise" on 31 March, directed by RT! and Staubach. The album was included in a package with No Pads, No Helmets...Just Balls later in the month. A music video was released for "This Song Saved My Life" on 25 March 2013, directed by David F. Mewa, was intended to highlight the consequences of human trafficking. The clip shows a person putting a new shirt, before finding a note in the collar that read "Help Me". It cuts to Chinese children sewing shirts in a factory, where one of them attempts to escape and is imprisoned. In August, the album was packaged with Still Not Getting Any.... The Get Your Heart On – The Second Coming! EP was released in December, featuring outtakes written during the album's sessions.

== Touring ==
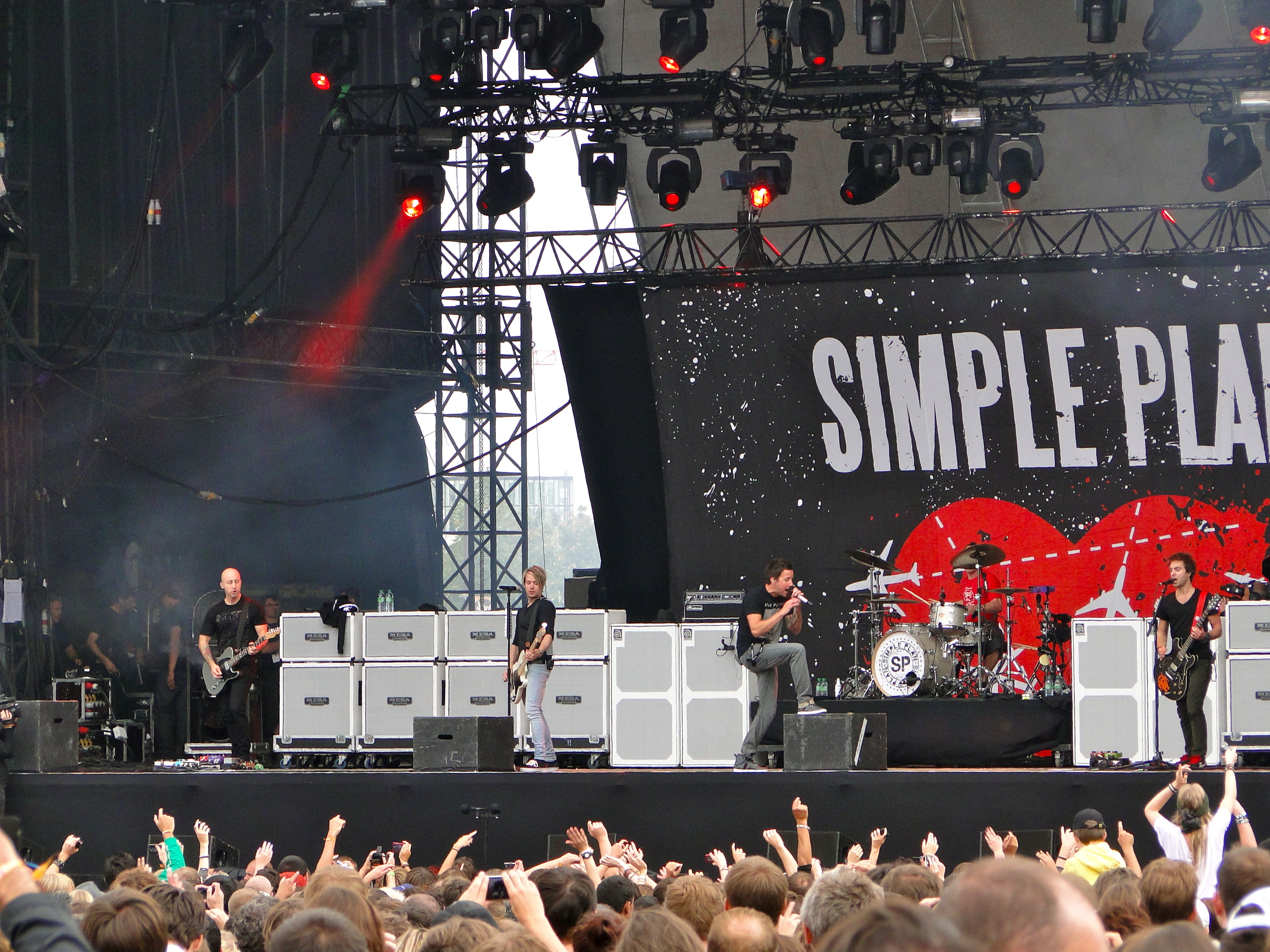
Simple Plan performing live in 2011

Prior to the release of Get Your Heart On!, the band performed at the Rock am Ring and Rock im Park festivals. Three days after its release, the band appeared on Hoppus on Music. The band performed as part of the 2011 Warped Tour; they were initially scheduled to play until 24 July, however, five further dates were added, lasting until the end of the month. While touring Asia in August, Bouvier was diagnosed with swollen vocal cords, and ordered to rest. As a result, the remainder of the Asian dates, and shows in Europe, for the rest of the month were cancelled. They continued playing shows in Europe in early September.

During September and October, they performed in Australia, with supporting bands Tonight Alive and New Empire. Simple Plan went on a headlining US tour with support from Forever the Sickest Kids, the Cab and Marianas Trench in October and November. Following this, they embarked on a Brazilian tour. In January 2012, the band went on a tour of China, followed by a Canadian tour in February, with support from All Time Low, Marianas Trench and These Kids Wear Crowns. In March, the group went on a European tour, and performed "Jet Lag" on Fideles Au Poste. In April, the band appeared at the Groezrock festival, which was followed by a brief UK tour in May. In October, they embarked on a tour of Mexico.

== Reception ==
=== Critical response ===
Professional ratings
Aggregate scores
Source	Rating
Metacritic	66/100
Review scores
Source	Rating
AbsolutePunk	74%
AllMusic	3/5 stars
Alternative Press	3.5/5 stars
Alter the Press!	3/5 stars
Entertainment Weekly	B
Kerrang!	3/5 stars
Melodic	2/5 stars
Rock Sound	7/10
Sputnikmusic	2/5

Upon its release, the album received generally positive reviews from most music critics, based on an aggregate score of 66/100 from Metacritic. Andrew Leahey wrote for Allmusic that "Get Your Heart On! manages to sound young at heart without making most of the mistakes that plague albums by younger groups." Leahey finished his review, writing that "Simple Plan may be too old to write this sort of music, which sounds as though it’s still aimed at teenagers, but that doesn’t mean they’ve lost their knack for it, and Get Your Heart On! is every bit as tuneful as the group’s debut." The Alternative Press review was favorable, writing that "While Get Your Heart On! might not be the true return to form the band envisioned, it's ultimately worth the wait." Absolute Punk's Joe DreAndrea wrote that "Get Your Heart On! is a Simple Plan album -- it's an obvious statement, but one that some people will have trouble realizing anyway. Because of this, it's still one of the poppiest records you'll hear all year. The production is big, and the lyrics are ridiculous."

Liam McGarry from Alter the Press! also gave to the album a favorable review, writing that "Simple Plan were never going to turn heads with a brave new style or a complete musical makeover to shatter any pre-conceptions you had of them. With GYHO!, they have stayed true to their own sound, a sound that got them where they are today. So while they more than likely wont garner any new fans, they'll please their die hard following, and continue to live the dream." Entertainment Weekly wrote: "The pop-punkers too often distract from adenoidal loud-and-proud angst-athons". Kerrang! was direct, writing "It may not be rocket science, but there is an art to doing this right and Simple Plan have once again pulled it off", while Andy Ritchie from Rock Sound applauded the album, writing "This is still above average dude rock from the Canadian five-piece."

On the other hand, an unfavorable review came from the Sputnikmusic's staff, who went to write that "'Get Your Heart On!' is an album of missed opportunities. Despite being Simple Plan's poppiest release yet, it is also their least catchy, indistinct and forgettable."

=== Commercial performance ===
Get Your Heart On! debuted at number two on the Canadian Albums Chart selling 13,000 copies, only behind Adele, whose album 21 charted atop with 15,000 copies. The album debuted on the US Billboard 200 at number fifty-two, selling only 9,000 copies, being comparatively weak comparing to the band's previous albums. It fell off the week after with a complete lack of record sales in contrast to the band's previous efforts. In other countries it managed to reach the top ten.

== Track listing ==
All songs are written by Pierre Bouvier & Chuck Comeau and performed by Simple Plan; other co-writers are listed below.

No.	Title	Writer(s)	Length
1.	"You Suck at Love"	Matt Squire	3:11
2.	"Can't Keep My Hands off You" (feat. Rivers Cuomo)	Rivers Cuomo	3:21
3.	"Jet Lag" (feat. Natasha Bedingfield)	Nolan Sipe, Ryan Petersen	3:24
4.	"Astronaut"	Jim Irvin, Julian Emery	3:41
5.	"Loser of the Year"	Claude Kelly	3:26
6.	"Anywhere Else But Here"	Michael Anthony Warren	3:44
7.	"Freaking Me Out" (feat. Alex Gaskarth)	Irvin, Emery	3:07
8.	"Summer Paradise" (featuring K'naan)	K'naan, Emanuel Kiriakou	3:56
9.	"Gone Too Soon"	Kiriakou	3:16
10.	"Last One Standing"		3:27
11.	"This Song Saved My Life"	Toby Gad	3:12

2012 UK bonus track / UK iTunes deluxe edition bonus track
No.	Title	Length
12.	"Summer Paradise" (feat. Sean Paul) (alternate version)	3:56

Pre-order / Japan Version / iTunes deluxe edition bonus tracks
No.	Title	Length
12.	"Jet Lag" (feat. Marie-Mai) (alternate version)	3:24
13.	"Never Should Have Let You Go"	4:23
14.	"Loser of the Year" (acoustic version)	3:50

Japan tour edition bonus track
No.	Title	Length
15.	"Summer Paradise" (feat. Taka from ONE OK ROCK) (alternate version)	4:00

French-Canadian deluxe edition bonus tracks
No.	Title	Length
12.	"Jet Lag" (feat. Marie-Mai) (alternate version)	3:24
13.	"Summer Paradise" (feat. Sean Paul) (alternate version)	3:56
14.	"Summer Paradise" (feat. Sean Paul) (French version)	3:53

Chinese edition tracks
No.	Title	Length
3.	"Jet Lag" (feat. Kelly Cha) (alternate version)	3:24

== Personnel ==
Simple Plan

- Pierre Bouvier – lead vocals, acoustic guitar, group vocals
- Jeff Stinco – lead guitar, group vocals
- Sebastien Lefebvre – rhythm guitar, backing vocals, group vocals
- David Desrosiers – bass guitar, backing vocals, group vocals
- Chuck Comeau – drums, percussion, group vocals

Additional personnel

- Rivers Cuomo – guest vocals on "Can't Keep My Hands Off You"
- Natasha Bedingfield – guest vocals on "Jet Lag"
- K'naan – guest vocals on "Summer Paradise"
- Alex Gaskarth – guest vocals on "Freaking Me Out"
- Marie-Mai – guest vocals on "Jet Lag" (French Version)
- Simple Plan fans – vocals on "This Song Saved My Life"
- Brian Howes – production

Production

- Brian Howes – producer, recording
- Patrick Boyette – engineer
- Keith Armstrong – assistant engineer
- Nik Karpen – assistant engineer
- Chris Lord-Alge – mixing
- Brad Townsend – assistant engineer
- Andrew Schubert – assistant engineer
- Ted Jensen – mastering at Sterling Sound in New York City, NY

== Charts ==
Chart (2011)	Peak position
Australian Albums (ARIA)	13
Austrian Albums (Ö3 Austria)	22
Belgian Albums (Ultratop Flanders)	75
Belgian Albums (Ultratop Wallonia)	34
Canadian Albums (Billboard))	2
Czech Albums (ČNS IFPI)	30
Dutch Albums (Album Top 100)	36
French Albums (SNEP)	10
German Albums (Offizielle Top 100)	10
Italian Albums (FIMI)	93
Japanese Albums (Oricon)	15
Mexican Albums (Top 100 Mexico)	15
South Korean Albums (Circle)	21
Scottish Albums (OCC)	79
Spanish Albums (PROMUSICAE)	17
Swedish Albums (Sverigetopplistan)	50
Swiss Albums (Schweizer Hitparade)	7
Taiwanese Albums (G-Music)	8
UK Albums (OCC)	71
UK Rock & Metal Albums (OCC)	5
US Billboard 200	52
US Top Rock Albums (Billboard)	14
US Top Alternative Albums (Billboard)	10

== Certifications ==
Region	Certification	Certified units/sales
Canada (Music Canada)	Platinum	80,000^{‡}
^{‡} Sales+streaming figures based on certification alone.
