= Simple Plan (album) =

Studio album by Simple Plan
- Released: February 12, 2008
- Recorded: Early-to-mid 2007
- Studios: Hit Factory Criteria; NRG; Piccolo; Conway; Maratone
- Genres: Alternative rock; pop-punk; pop rock
- Length: 43:34
- Labels: Atlantic; Lava
- Producers: Dave Fortman; Danja; Max Martin

Simple Plan chronology
| MTV Hard Rock Live (2005) | Simple Plan (2008) | Get Your Heart On! (2011) |

Singles from Simple Plan
- 1. "When I'm Gone" Released: October 29, 2007; 2. "Your Love Is a Lie" Released: February 28, 2008; 3. "Save You" Released: August 14, 2008

Rejected cover

Simple Plan is the third studio album by Canadian rock band Simple Plan, released on February 12, 2008. The album was a large musical departure from the band's previous albums, as its theme was more love-based than teen angst. It is also the band's first full-length album to carry a Parental Advisory label. It reached number 2 on the Canadian album charts, number 14 on the US Billboard 200 and charted in the top 10 worldwide in countries including Australia, Austria, Brazil, Sweden and Switzerland.

== Background ==
Simple Plan released their second album Still Not Getting Any... in October 2004. In July 2005, vocalist Pierre Bouvier said that while they hadn't written any new material, he expected them to release a new record by mid 2006. Touring in support of Still Not Getting Any... concluded in February 2006 with a European trek. Bouvier said the band aimed to write new material for around three months, and have a new record out by the end of the year. Instead, the band took a break in March, and began writing every day since April.

Bouvier and Comeau wrote material together in a room using Pro Tools with programmed drums, eventually coming up with demos. By November, they had 70–80 ideas for new songs, which had been written between Montreal, San Diego and Barbados, and 10–11 completed ones. Major label Atlantic Records, which the group were signed to, said the band were going to enter a recording studio in November. However, the members weren't impressed by the material they had up to this point and delayed they recording plans, much to the chagrin of Atlantic.

== Production ==
Writing continued up to the Christmas period; following two shows in Brazil in January 2007, the band had planned to enter a studio at the end of the month with Bob Rock, who had produced their previous album. However, their plans to record basic tracks were delayed as Rock was busy working with The Offspring. In early March, the band finished two songs, before traveling to Miami, Florida where they recorded another song at Hit Factory Criteria Studios with Danja. He was known as Timbaland's protégé and had worked with Britney Spears; the band felt working with him was a change of pace due to his production background. Danja played the band some synthesizer-based and beat-focused ideas that they would write over. The group subsequently wrote the remainder of what would feature on their album.

Atlantic gave the band a list of producers and albums they worked on for them to listen to. They picked Dave Fortman for his work with Evanescence; he want to give the band a big drum sound and took them to NRG Studios in Los Angeles, California. Comeau worked on the parts with Bouvier and bassist David Desrosiers, who of whom were proficient drummers. They returning to their hometown of Montreal to continue recording at Studios Piccolo. Further recording was done at Conway Studios, also in Los Angeles, and at Maratone Studios in Stockholm, Sweden. Marcella Araica engineered the Hit Factory sessions; Fortman and Jeremy Parker (who was also in charge of Pro Tools) engineered the NRG and Piccolo sessions; and Max Martin, Doug McKean and Seth Waldmann engineered the Conway and Maratone sessions. All of the final recordings were produced by Fortman; he co-produced "When I'm Gone" and "The End" with Danja, and "Generation" with Danja and Martin. In September, the album was mixed by Chris Lord-Alge at Resonate in Los Angeles, before Ted Jensen mastered it at Sterling Sound in New York City. Unlike the previous two studio albums, Simple Plan contains profanity and thus the first Simple Plan studio album to contain a Parental Advisory.

== Composition ==
=== Overview ===
Simple Plan has been described as alternative rock, pop punk and pop rock, with the band incorporating the use of loops, programmed beats and pianos. Guitarist Jeff Stinco predominantly used a Bogner amplifier and an altered Marshall amplifier. He and guitarist Sébastien Lefebvre used less distortion overall to give the guitars a bigger sound. The pair utilized a number of effects pedals, such as delay, chorus and distortion. Stinco typically played Gibson guitars, however, due to tuning issues, he played a Framus guitar that Lefebvre gave him. Stinco estimated that three quarters of the rhythm parts were done with the Framus, while all of the lead parts were played using a Fender Telecaster.

Three of the songs – "Time to Say Goodbye", "I Can Wait Forever" and "What If" – were credited solely to the band while the remainder were co-writes: Arnold Lanni, who had previously produced the band's debut No Pads, No Helmets...Just Balls, co-wrote "When I'm Gone", "Take My Hand", "The End", "Your Love Is a Lie", "Save You", "Generation", "Holding On" and "No Love"; Danja co-wrote "When I'm Gone", "The End" and "Generation", the latter also featured credit from Martin. David Campbell arranged and conducted strings on "The End", "I Can Wait Forever", "No Love" and "What If". Liam O'Neil added keyboards to "When I'm Gone", "Time to Say Goodbye", "I Can Wait Forever", "No Love" and "What If". Former Limp Bizkit member DJ Lethal provided additional programming on "Take My Hand" and a drum loop for "Your Love Is a Lie"; the latter also featured additional programming by Danja.

=== Tracks ===
The opening "When I'm Gone" is the Mutt Lange-indebted arena rock track, which begins with electronic flourishes. When working on the song, Bouvier said Danja had no experience collaborating with rock musicians. Comeau described "Take My Hand" as a mix of Simple Plan, the Killers and AFI. "The End" was reminiscent of AFI. "Your Love Is a Lie" recalls "Boulevard of Broken Dreams" by Green Day, and was about Comeau's unfaithful ex-girlfriend.

"Save You" is a mid-tempo song that was written in tribute to Pierre Bouvier's brother Jay, who was diagnosed with cancer. "Generation" was written, before the band showed it to Martin, who added changed one of the hooks to a synthesizer. It features the same trumpet-and-drum sample that was previously used in "Hurt" by T.I., which Danja had created. The keyboard parts in evoked the sound of Saga and Europe, both of which Lanni worked with. "I Can Wait Forever" is a ballad that consists of piano and string accompaniment, with a Slash-esque guitar solo. "Holding On" was compared to The Joshua Tree-era U2 and Fall Out Boy.

== Release ==
On October 24, 2007, the band announced their next album for release early next year. During a livestream event, the group premiered "When I'm Gone". "When I'm Gone" was released as the first single on October 29 via iTunes; the digital download version included "Running Out of Time" and an acoustic version of "When I'm Gone" as bonus tracks. On November 3, the album's track listing was posted online. On December 3, the band announced that the album would be delayed two weeks due to manufacturing issues, alongside the alteration of lyrics in "Generation". On December 11, a music video was released for "When I'm Gone".

After initially being scheduled for December 2007, and then January 29, Simple Plan was eventually released on February 12 through Atlantic and Lava Records. The planned artwork saw the band against a fire backdrop; however, due to a fan-voted poll, it ended up being a black-and-white photo of the group. A deluxe edition digipak was also release, containing a DVD with behind-the-scenes footage.

"Your Love Is a Lie" was released as a single on April 11; the digital download version included a live version of the song as a bonus track. The song's music video was directed by Wayne Isham. "Save You" was released as a single on October 10; the digital download version included live versions of "Welcome to My Life" and "Addicted" as bonus tracks. Portions of each sale were distributed to various cancer charities through the group's Simple Plan Foundation. The track's music video was posted online on October 24, which featured footage of cancer survivors. Animax Asia made an animated video for "I Can Wait Forever", which aired in Aisia and was posted online in December.

== Touring ==
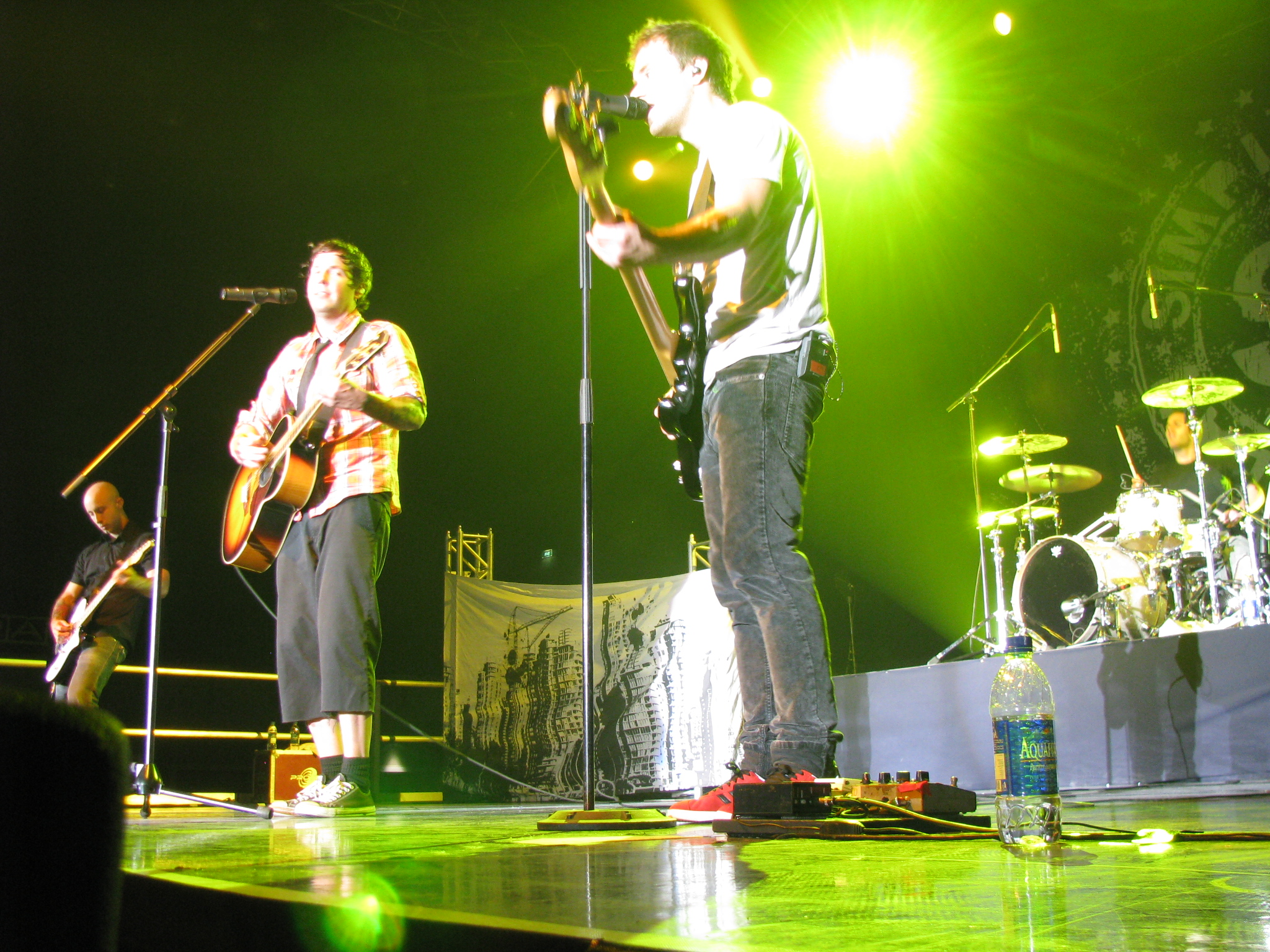
Simple Plan performing live in 2008.

Throughout December 2007, the band performed a series of holiday shows to promote the forthcoming album. On January 27, 2008, the group played three shows in London on the same day. Following its release, the band performed or appeared on Late Night with Conan O'Brien, The Morning Show with Mike and Juliet, The Sauce, Total Request Live and Jimmy Kimmel Live!. They embarked on a North American club tour with support from the Graduate from late February, which was followed by a European trek that last until late April. Between May and August, the band appeared at The Bamboozle and Download festivals, and performed "Your Love Is a Lie" on Canadian Idol.

Following this, the band embarked on a Canadian tour with the All-American Rejects and Faber Drive, which ran into September. In November, the group toured across Europe, before a stint in the middle east in December. In January 2009, the band performed at the National Hockey League All-Star Game, where they played "Your Love Is a Lie" and "Generation". Preceded by a show in Canada, the group embarked on a South American tour in March. Following this, the band played a one-off show in Barbados in April. In June and July, the band played at various festival across Canada: Des Fromages, D'Ete De Shawinigan, Festival of Lights and Virgin Festival.

== Critical reception ==
Professional ratings
Aggregate scores
| Source | Rating |
|---|---|
| Metacritic | 51/100 |
Review scores
| Source | Rating |
| AllMusic | 3.5/5 stars |
| Alternative Press | 4/5 stars |
| The A.V. Club | D |
| Billboard | (favorable) |
| Blender | 2/5 stars |
| Entertainment Weekly | C− |
| Now | 1/5 |
| Q | 2/5 stars |
| Rolling Stone | 2/5 stars |
| Spin | 2/5 stars |

Simple Plan received mixed reviews from music critics, according to review aggregator Metacritic.

== Commercial performance ==
"When I'm Gone" peaked at number 11 on the Canadian Hot 100 and number 26 on the UK Singles Chart. "Your Love Is a Lie" reached number 16 on the Canadian Hot 100 and number 8 on the US Billboard Bubbling Under Hot 100 Singles. "Save You" peaked at number 18 on the Canadian Hot 100. "No Love", entered the Canadian Hot 100 in the issue of March 12, 2009, peaking at number 77. "Generation" managed to peak at number 90 on the Canadian Hot 100 in the issue of June 18. The album would also be nominated for the 2008 Juno Awards in the Best Album category, but lost to Nickelback's Dark Horse.

== Track listing ==
Writing credits per booklet.

| No. | Title | Writer(s) | Producer | Length |
|---|---|---|---|---|
| 1. | "When I'm Gone" | Simple Plan; Nate Hills; Arnold Lanni | Dave Fortman; Danja | 3:49 |
| 2. | "Take My Hand" | Simple Plan; Lanni | Fortman | 3:52 |
| 3. | "The End" | Simple Plan; Hills; Lanni | Danja; Fortman | 3:22 |
| 4. | "Your Love Is a Lie" | Simple Plan; Lanni | Fortman | 3:42 |
| 5. | "Save You" | Simple Plan; Lanni | Fortman | 3:45 |
| 6. | "Generation" | Simple Plan; Max Martin; Hills; Lanni | Danja; Martin; Fortman | 3:02 |
| 7. | "Time to Say Goodbye" | Simple Plan | Fortman | 2:56 |
| 8. | "I Can Wait Forever" | Simple Plan | Fortman | 4:54 |
| 9. | "Holding On" | Simple Plan; Lanni | Fortman | 5:03 |
| 10. | "No Love" | Simple Plan; Lanni | Fortman | 3:15 |
| 11. | "What If" | Simple Plan | Fortman | 5:54 |
| Total length: | | | | 43:33 |

Napster edition bonus track
| No. | Title | Length |
|---|---|---|
| 12. | "Shut Up!" (Live from Montreal) | 3:06 |

Deluxe, Japanese and UK edition bonus tracks
| No. | Title | Length |
|---|---|---|
| 12. | "Running Out of Time" | 3:16 |
| 13. | "When I'm Gone" (acoustic version) | 3:28 |

Limited edition bonus DVD
| No. | Title | Length |
|---|---|---|
| 1. | "Simple Plan: The Making of" |
| 2. | "When I'm Gone: Beyond the Video" | 3:36 |
| 3. | "When I'm Gone: Music Video" |
| 4. | "Simple Plan: Beyond the Photo Shoot" |
| 5. | "Simple Plan: Live in NYC" | 15:49 |

== Personnel ==
Personnel per booklet.

Simple Plan

- Pierre Bouvier – lead vocals, acoustic guitar
- Chuck Comeau – drums
- David Desrosiers – bass guitar, background vocals
- Sébastien Lefebvre – guitars, background vocals
- Jeff Stinco – guitars

Additional musicians

- Liam O'Neil – keyboards (tracks 1, 7, 8, 10 and 11)
- DJ Lethal – additional programming (track 2), drum loop (track 4)
- Danja – additional programming (track 4)
- David Campbell – string arranger, conductor (tracks 3, 8, 10 and 11)

Production

- Dave Fortman – producer, engineer
- Danja – producer (tracks 1, 3 and 6)
- Max Martin – producer (track 6), engineer
- Jeremy Parker – engineer, Pro-Tools
- Marcella Araica – engineer
- Doug McKean – engineer
- Seth Waldmann – engineer
- Chris Lord-Alge – mixing
- Ted Jensen – mastering
- Warick Saint – album photography
- Simple Plan – art direction and concept
- Rachelle Dupere – art direction for Atlantic
- Fred Jérôme – layout design

== Charts ==
=== Weekly charts ===
| Chart (2008) | Peak position |
|---|---|
| Australian Albums (ARIA) | 6 |
| Austrian Albums (Ö3 Austria) | 9 |
| Belgian Albums (Ultratop Flanders) | 32 |
| Belgian Albums (Ultratop Wallonia) | 46 |
| Brazilian Albums (ABPD) | 8 |
| Canadian Albums (Billboard) | 2 |
| Dutch Albums (Album Top 100) | 43 |
| Finnish Albums (Suomen virallinen lista) | 19 |
| French Albums (SNEP) | 16 |
| German Albums (Offizielle Top 100) | 10 |
| Irish Albums (IRMA) | 69 |
| Italian Albums (FIMI) | 19 |
| Mexican Albums (AMPROFON) | 15 |
| New Zealand Albums (RMNZ) | 12 |
| Scottish Albums (OCC) | 32 |
| Spanish Albums (Promusicae) | 13 |
| Swedish Albums (Sverigetopplistan) | 7 |
| Swiss Albums (Schweizer Hitparade) | 7 |
| UK Albums (Official Charts) | 31 |
| US Billboard 200 | 14 |
| US Top Alternative Albums (Billboard) | 4 |
| US Top Rock Albums (Billboard) | 3 |

=== Year-end charts ===
| Chart (2008) | Position |
|---|---|
| French Albums (SNEP) | 132 |

== Certifications ==
Certifications for Simple Plan
| Region | Certification | Certified units/sales |
|---|---|---|
| Brazil (Pro-Música Brasil) digital album | Platinum | 60,000^{*} |
| Canada (Music Canada) | Platinum | 100,000^{^} |
| Mexico (AMPROFON) | Gold | 40,000^{^} |
^{*} Sales figures based on certification alone.^{^} Shipments figures based on certification alone.
