= Pierre Bouvier =

Canadian musician (born 1979)

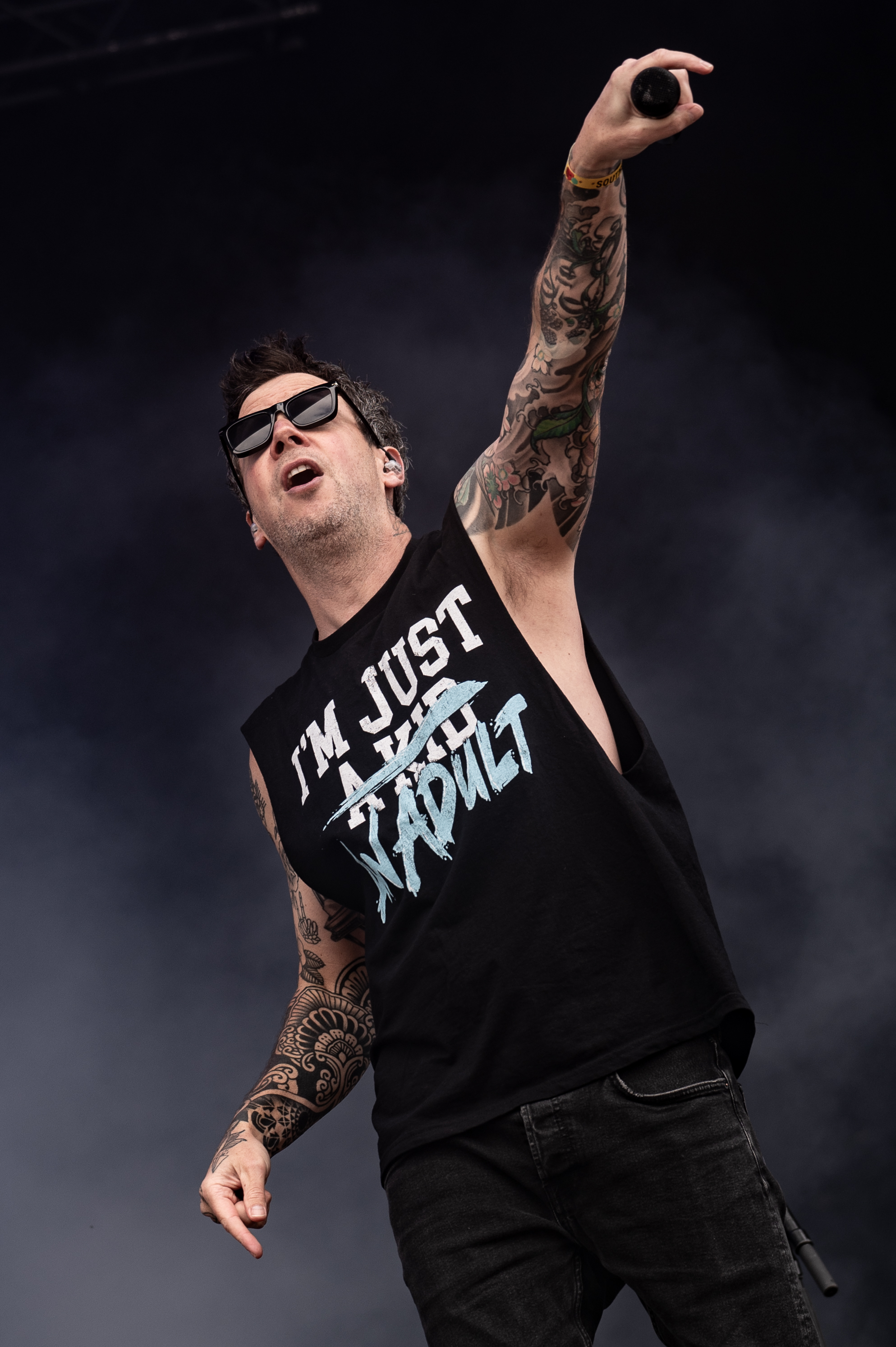
- Bouvier performing with Simple Plan in 2024

Background information
- Born: May 9, 1979 (age 47); Montreal, Quebec, Canada
- Genres: Pop-punk; alternative rock; pop rock; emo; punk rock; power pop
- Occupations: Musician; singer; songwriter
- Instruments: Vocals; bass; guitar; percussion
- Years active: 1993–present
- Member of: Simple Plan
- Formerly of: Reset; Artists Against Bullying

Pierre Bouvier MSC (born May 9, 1979) is a Canadian singer and musician best known for being the lead vocalist and bassist of the rock band Simple Plan. Since 2020, he has served as bass guitarist following the departure of David Desrosiers. He also founded the apparel company Role Model Clothing along with his bandmate Chuck Comeau and the band's best friend, Patrick Langlois, and hosted the MTV reality show Damage Control.

== Filmography ==
Year	Title	Role	Notes
2003	The New Tom Green Show	Himself	1 episode
2003	A Big Package for You	Himself	
2004	What's New, Scooby-Doo?	Himself (voice)	Also performed the theme song with Simple Plan
2004	New York Minute	Himself	
2004	Punk Rock Holocaust	Himself	
2005	Damage Control	Himself	Host
2011	Canada Sings	Himself	
2025	The Kids In The Crowd	Himself	Documentary about Simple Plan

== Discography ==
=== With Reset ===
- Concerned (Demo, 1995)
- No Worries (1997)
- No Limits (1999)

=== With Simple Plan ===
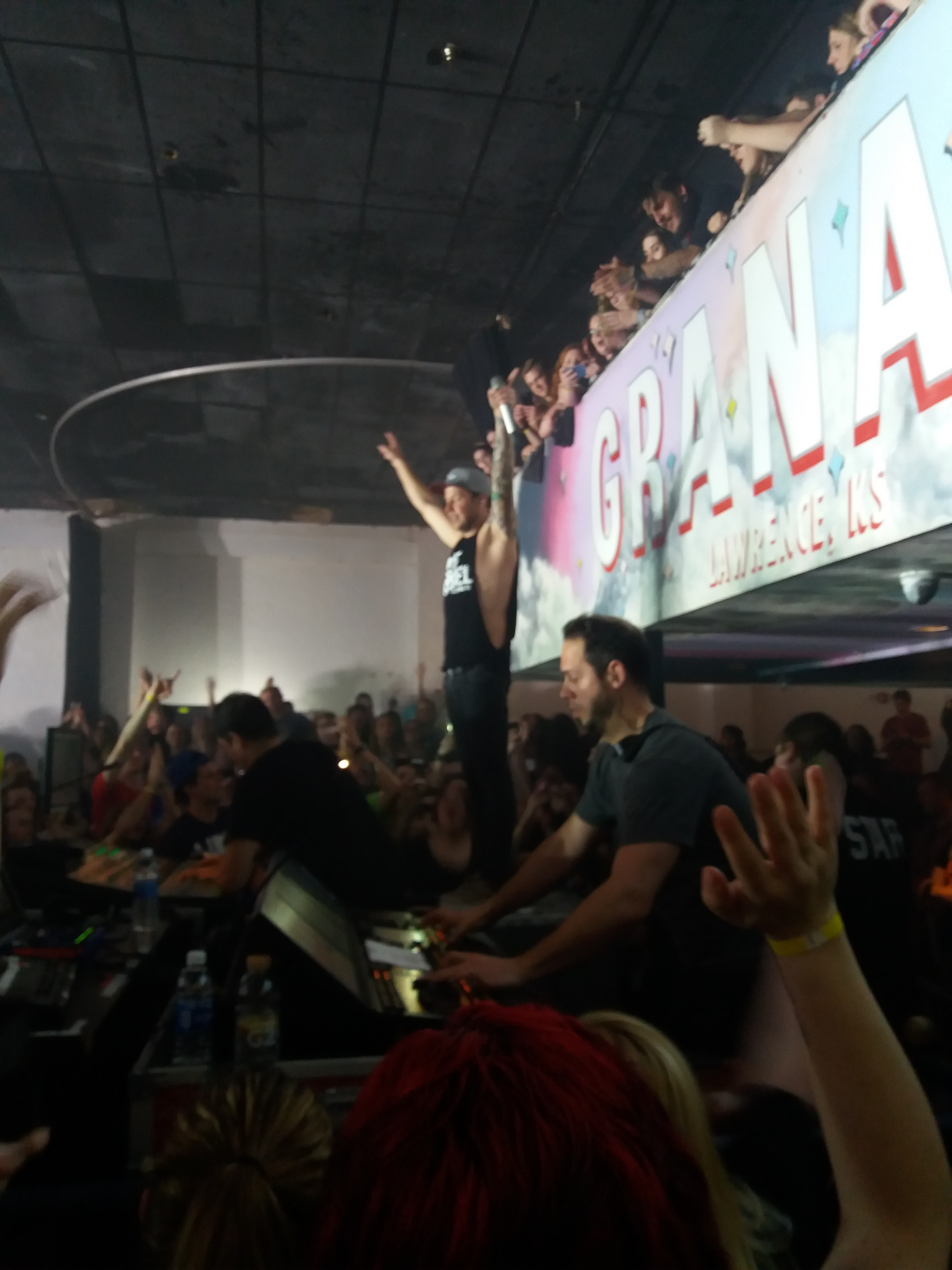
Bouvier performing with Simple Plan in April 2017

- No Pads, No Helmets...Just Balls (2002)
- Still Not Getting Any... (2004)
- Simple Plan (2008)
- Get Your Heart On! (2011)
- Taking One for the Team (2016)
- Harder Than It Looks (2022)

=== Collaborations and appearances ===
- "It's Not Easy (Being Green)" – MC Lars (2009)
- "Wavin' Flag" – K'naan (2010)
- "True Colors" – Artists Against (2012)
- "Too Little, Too Late" – Faber Drive (2013)
- "December" – MxPx (2018)
- "The Fun in Life" – Elton Castee (2019)
- "Alleys" – DOMENO (2019)
- "Take What You Give" – Silverstein (2020)
- "NICOTINA" – GionnyScandal (2021)
- "I Hate Everybody" – Chad Tepper (2021)
- "my ex" – Chad Tepper (2022)
- "Loser Kid 2.0" – Busted (2023)
- ”Iconic” - Jax (2023)
- ”Don't Listen To My Voicemail” - Your Broken Hero (2024)
- "Can You Feel the Love Tonight" (The Lion King) - Simple Plan (from Disney's A Whole New Sound compilation album) (2024)
- "Young & Dumb" - Avril Lavigne (2025)
- "Perfect cover - Lauren Paley & Cole Rolland (from Punk Goes Princess EP) (2026)
