= Hedley discography =

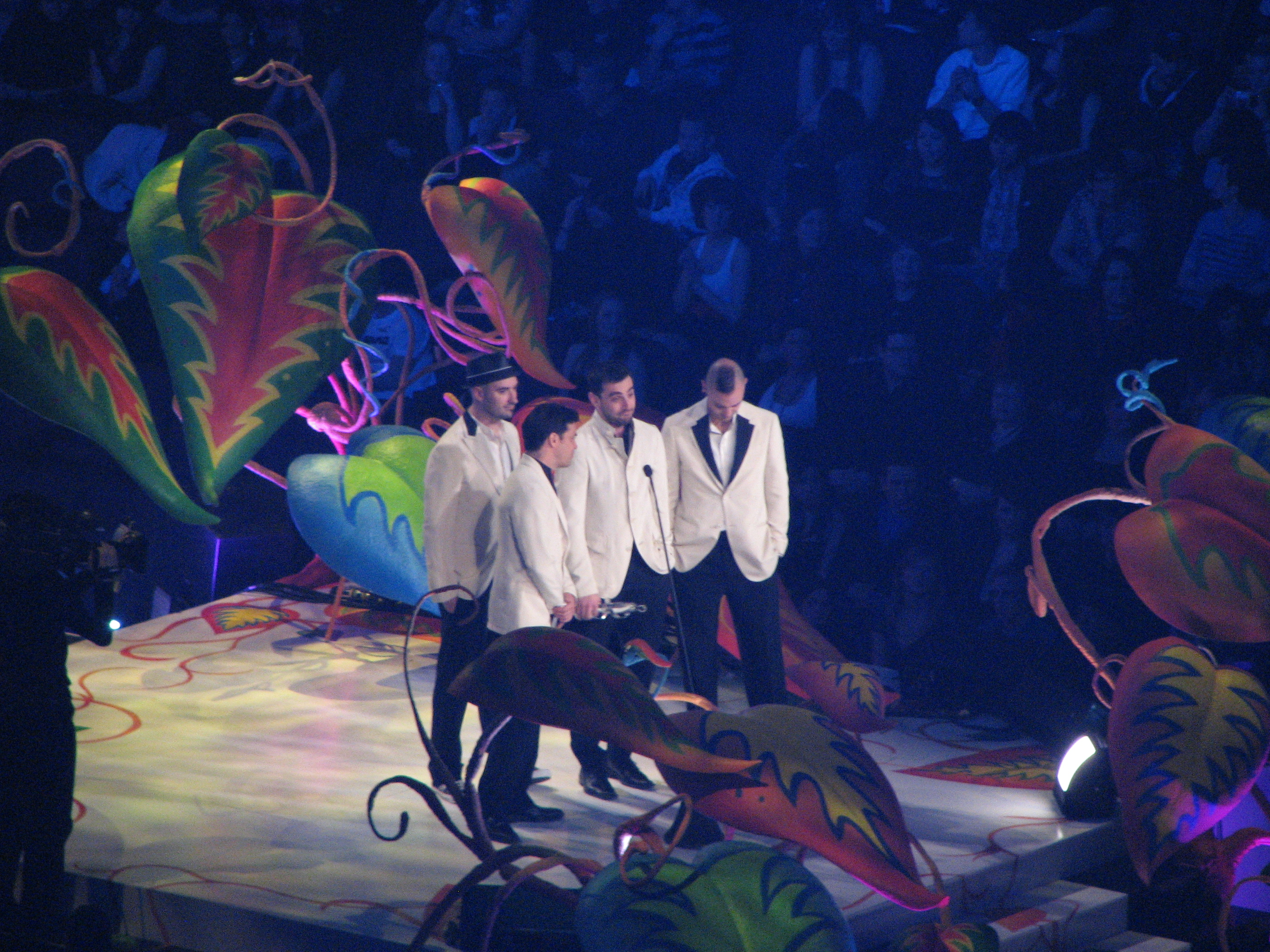
- Hedley presents an award at the 2009 Juno Awards in Vancouver, British Columbia, Canada.
- Studio albums: 7
- Extended plays: 1
- Live albums: 1
- Compilation albums: 1
- Singles: 29
- Video albums: 1
- Music videos: 24

Hedley was a Canadian pop rock band from Vancouver, British Columbia. Their discography comprises seven studio albums - Hedley, Famous Last Words, The Show Must Go, Storms, Wild Life, Hello and Cageless - one live album - Go with the Show - and twenty-nine singles, with twenty-four made into music videos.

Their first six albums have been certified platinum by Music Canada and have charted in the top ten on the Canadian Albums Chart. Their debut single, "On My Own", reached number one on the Canadian Singles Chart, while nine of their subsequent singles have reached the top 10 of the Billboard Canadian Hot 100 since the 2007 creation of that chart.

The band's second album Famous Last Words, produced three top-ten singles: "For the Nights I Can't Remember", "Never Too Late" and "Old School". The group's follow-up album The Show Must Go, featured two top-ten singles: "Cha-Ching" and "Perfect", the latter also reached number 25 on the US Adult Pop Airplay chart. The band's highest-charting single on the chart, "Kiss You Inside Out" peaked at number two and was certified 3× Platinum in Canada. The following year, the group released "Anything", which peaked at number five on the Canadian Hot 100 and was certified 4× Platinum by Music Canada, the band's best-selling single. Their sixth album Hello had three singles reached the top fifty on the Canadian Hot 100: "Hello", "Lose Control" and "Can't Slow Down". Their seventh album Cageless featured two singles in the top fifty: "Love Again" and "Better Days".

The band has sold over a million albums and 4 million singles.

== Albums ==
=== Studio albums ===
List of albums, with selected chart positions, sales figures and certifications
Title	Album details	Peak chart positions		Sales	Certifications
Title	Album details	CAN	CAN Alt.	Sales	Certifications
Hedley	Released: September 6, 2005; Label: Universal Canada, Capitol, Fontana; Format: CD, digital download	3	14	CAN: 200,000	MC: 2× Platinum
Famous Last Words	Released: October 30, 2007; Label: Universal Canada; Format: CD, digital download	3	1		MC: Platinum
The Show Must Go	Released: November 17, 2009; Label: Universal Canada, Island; Format: CD, digital download	6	—		MC: 2× Platinum
Storms	Released: November 8, 2011; Label: Universal Canada, Island; Format: CD, digital download	2	—	CAN: 23,000	MC: Platinum
Wild Life	Released: November 11, 2013; Label: Universal Canada, Capitol; Format: CD, digital download	4	—	CAN: 64,000	MC: Platinum
Hello	Released: November 6, 2015; Label: Universal Canada; Format: CD, digital download, vinyl	1	—	CAN: 14,500	MC: Platinum
Cageless	Released: September 29, 2017; Label: Universal Canada; Format: CD, digital download, vinyl	2	—	CAN: 9,000	
"—" denotes releases that did not chart.

=== Compilation albums ===
List of compilation albums
Title	Album details	Note(s)
Never Too Late	Released: May 12, 2009; Label: Fontana; Format: CD, digital download	Released only in the United States; Compiled from Hedley and Famous Last Words

=== Extended plays ===
List of extended plays with relevant details
Title	EP details	Note(s)
iTunes Sessions	Released: April 20, 2010; Label: Universal Canada; Format: Digital download	Acoustic performances of songs from their first three studio albums

=== Live albums ===
List of live albums, with selected chart positions
Title	Album details	Peak
Title	Album details	CAN
Go with the Show	Released: November 9, 2010; Label: Universal Canada; Format: CD, digital download	27
"—" denotes releases that did not chart.

== Singles ==
=== 2000s ===
List of singles, with selected chart positions, showing year released and album name
Title	Year	Peak chart positions						Album
Title	Year	CAN	CAN AC	CAN CHR	CAN HAC	CAN Rock	AUS	Album
"On My Own"	2005	1	—	22	20	—	—	Hedley
"Villain"	2005	—	—	—	—	18	—	Hedley
"Trip"	2005	11	—	14	9	—	—	Hedley
"321"	2006	—	—	21	—	—	—	Hedley
"Gunnin'"	2006	—	—	27	31	—	—	Hedley
"Street Fight"	2006	—	—	—	—	—	—	Hedley
"She's So Sorry"	2007	50	—	48	—	—	—	Famous Last Words
"For the Nights I Can't Remember"	2007	6	13	4	1	—	—	Famous Last Words
"Never Too Late"	2008	4	—	5	2	—	—	Famous Last Words
"Old School"	2008	10	—	9	3	—	—	Famous Last Words
"Dying to Live Again"	2008	59	—	21	13	—	—	Famous Last Words
"Cha-Ching"	2009	6	—	7	2	—	— (Note: "Cha Ching" did not enter the ARIA Singles Chart, but peaked at number 16 on the ARIA Hitseekers Chart.)	The Show Must Go
"Don't Talk to Strangers"	2009	11	—	8	8	—	—	The Show Must Go
"—" denotes releases that did not chart. Singles above "Gunnin'" charted on the Canadian Singles Chart.

=== 2010s ===
List of singles, with selected chart positions and certifications, showing year released and album name
Title	Year	Peak chart positions							Certifications	Sales	Album
Title	Year	CAN	CAN AC	CAN CHR	CAN HAC	AUS	NZ	US Adult	Certifications	Sales	Album
"Perfect"	2010	7	5	8	2	—	—	25			The Show Must Go
"Hands Up"	2010	27	—	14	7	—	—	—			The Show Must Go
"Sweater Song"	2010	63	—	33	29	—	—	—			The Show Must Go
"Invincible" (featuring P Reign)	2011	9	7	14	6	—	—	—	MC: 2× Platinum	CAN: 14,000	Storms
"One Life"	2011	16	29	16	7	—	—	—	MC: Platinum		Storms
"Kiss You Inside Out"	2012	2	1	7	4	—	—	24	MC: 3× Platinum	CAN: 240,000	Storms
"Anything"	2013	5	6	6	5	—	18	—	MC: 4× Platinum; RMNZ: Gold	CAN: 90,000	Wild Life
"Crazy for You"	2014	7	8	5	5	— (Note: "Crazy For You" did not enter the ARIA Singles Chart, but peaked at number 7 on the ARIA Hitseekers Chart.)	—	—	MC: 2× Platinum	CAN: 166,000	Wild Life
"Heaven in Our Headlights"	2014	14	5	8	4	—	—	—		CAN: 82,000	Wild Life
"Pocket Full of Dreams"	2014	33	10	18	10	—	—	—			Wild Life
"Lost in Translation"	2015	—	—	31	47	—	—	—			Hello
"Hello"	2015	20	9	8	2	—	—	—			Hello
"Lose Control"	2016	37	21	10	7	—	—	—	MC: Platinum		Hello
"Can't Slow Down"	2016	43	10	11	8	—	—	—			Hello
"Love Again"	2017	50	5	9	5	—	—	—	MC: Gold		Cageless
"Better Days"	2017	42	10	9	8	—	—	—	MC: Platinum		Cageless
"—" denotes releases that did not chart.

=== Promotional singles ===
List of promotional singles, showing year released and album name
Title	Year	Album
"Johnny Falls"	2005	Hedley
"Alison Wonderland (Afraid)"	2007	Famous Last Words
"Obsession"	2017	Cageless

== Other charted songs ==
Title	Year	Peak chart positions	Album
Title	Year	CAN	Album
"Heaven's Gonna Wait"	2012	65	Storms
"I Won't Let You Go (Darling)"	2012	76	Storms
"Beautiful Girl"	2013	72	Wild Life
"Wild Life"	2013	— (Note: "Wild Life" did not enter the Canadian Hot 100, but peaked at number 70 on the Hot Canadian Digital Song Sales component chart.)	Wild Life
"—" denotes releases that did not chart.

== Other appearances ==
Title	Year	Artist(s)	Album	Note
"Kiss You Inside Out" (Version Française)	2015	Hedley featuring Andrée-Anne Leclerc	Black and White Heart	Received lead billing despite being on Andee's (aka Andrée-Anne Leclerc) album.

== Videography ==
=== Video albums ===
- 2006: Try This at Home

=== Music videos ===
List of music videos, showing year released and director
Title	Year	Director
"On My Own"	2005	Sean Michael Turrell
"Trip"	2005	Jack Richardson
"321"	2006	Sean Michael Turrell
"Gunnin'"	2006	Kevin De Freitas, Chris Sargent
"Street Fight"	2006	—N/a
"She's So Sorry"	2007	Kevin De Freitas
"For the Nights I Can’t Remember"	2007	Kevin De Freitas
"Never Too Late"	2008	Colin Minihan
"Cha-Ching"	2009	Sean Michael Turrell
"Don't Talk to Strangers"	2009	Colin Minihan
"Perfect"	2010	Kyle Davison
"Invincible"	2011	Kyle Davison
"One Life"	2011	Marc Ricciardelli
"Kiss You Inside Out"	2012	Lisa Mann
"Kiss You Inside Out" (Version Française)	2012	Lisa Mann
"Anything"	2013	John 'JP' Poliquin
"Crazy for You"	2014	J.Lee Williams, Timur Musabay
"Heaven in Our Headlights"	2014	Jacob Hoggard, Matt Leaf
"Lost in Translation"	2015	Andy Hines, Daniel Grant
"Hello"	2015	Jacob Hoggard, Matt Leaf
"Lose Control"	2016	Lisa Mann, Samy Inayeh
"Can't Slow Down"	2016	Jacob Hoggard, Matt Leaf, Karim Hussain
"Love Again"	2017	Occupied, Jacob Hoggard, Emma Higgins
"Better Days"	2017	Ally Pankiw
