= Gunnin' =

2006 single by Hedley

Single by Hedley

from the album Hedley
- Released: September 19, 2006
- Recorded: 2005
- Genre: Acoustic rock
- Length: 4:13 (Album Version); 4:15 (Full Mix Version)
- Label: Universal Canada; Capitol
- Songwriters: Chris Crippin; Dave Genn; Jacob Hoggard; Tommy Mac; Dave Rosin
- Producer: Garth Richardson

Hedley singles chronology
"321" (2006)	"Gunnin'" (2006)	"Street Fight" (2006)

Music video
- "Gunnin'" on YouTube

"Gunnin'" is song by Canadian pop punk band Hedley. It was released on September 19, 2006, as the fifth single from their self-titled debut studio album. The song was also included on the American version of Never Too Late, released via Capitol Records. The song was written by the members of the band and by Dave Genn. The single also topped Canada's MuchMusic Countdown in 2006.

== Background ==
The music video for "Gunnin'" was directed by Kevin De Freitas and Chris Sargent, premiering via MuchMusic in 2006. In 2007, the song won "Best Pop Video" at the MuchMusic Awards. "Gunnin'" reached number one on Canada's MuchMusic Countdown on the week of December 1, 2006.

== Composition ==
"Gunnin'" was written by Jacob Hoggard, Dave Rosin, Tommy Mac, Chris Crippin and Dave Genn, while production was handled by Garth Richardson. The track is described as an acoustic rock song. Richardson earned a nomination for Producer of the Year at the Juno Awards 2006 for producing the track.

== Chart performance ==
"Gunnin'" reached number 27 on the Billboard Canada CHR/Top 40. The song also peaked at number 31 on Billboard Canada Hot AC.

== Awards and nominations ==
Awards and nominations for "Gunnin'"
Year	Organization	Award	Result	Ref(s)
2006	Juno Awards	Producer of the Year	Nominated	
2007	MuchMusic Video Awards	Best Pop Video of the Year	Won	
2007	MuchMusic Video Awards	People's Choice: Favourite Canadian Group	Nominated	
2007	MuchMusic Video Awards	Best Post-Production of the Year	Won	

== Track listing ==
Digital download
No.	Title	Length
1.	"Gunnin'" (Full Mix)	4:15

== Personnel ==
Credits for "Gunnin'" adapted from AllMusic.

Hedley

- Jacob Hoggard – lead vocals
- Dave Rosin – guitar
- Tommy Mac – bass guitar
- Chris Crippin – drums, percussion

Additional musicians

- Peter Barone – drums
- Dave Genn – guitar
- Ben Kaplan – guitar
- Brooks McKenna – guitar

Production

- Josh Bluman – assistant engineer
- Mike Cashin – mixing assistant
- Mike Fraser – mixing
- Garth Richardson – producer
- Ben Kaplan – programming
- Dean Maher – engineer
- James Morin – assistant engineer
- Shawn Penner – assistant engineer
- Kano Yajima – assistant engineer

== Charts ==
Chart performance for "Gunnin'"
Chart (2006)	Peak position
Canada CHR/Top 40 (Billboard)	27
Canada Hot AC (Billboard)	31

== Release history ==
Release history for "Gunnin'"
Region	Date	Format	Label	Ref.
Canada	September 19, 2006	Digital download	Universal Canada	
