= 321 (Hedley song) =

Single by Hedley

from the album Hedley
- Released: March 31, 2006
- Studio: Armoury Studios; Greenhouse Studios; Hipposonic Studios (Vancouver)
- Genre: Pop punk
- Length: 3:45
- Label: Universal Canada
- Songwriter(s): Chris Crippin; Jacob Hoggard; Brian Howes; Tommy Mac; Dave Rosin; Jim Vallance
- Producer(s): Brian Howes

Hedley singles chronology
"Trip" (2005)	"321" (2006)	"Gunnin'" (2006)

Music video
- "321" on YouTube

"321" is a song by Canadian rock group Hedley. It was released in March 31, 2006, as the fourth single from their debut self-titled studio album. The music video for the song topped the MuchMusic Countdown and was nominated for a MuchMusic Video Award in 2006.

== Background and composition ==
"321" was written by Chris Crippin, Jacob Hoggard, Tommy Mac, Dave Rosin and Jim Vallance, while production was handled by Brian Howes, who also attributed songwriting for the track. It was written in June 2005 in Vancouver, British Columbia. It was recorded at Armoury Studios, Greenhouse Studios and Hipposonic Studios in Vancouver. The song is about expressing both anger and regret towards a girl following an emotional meltdown. According to songwriter Jim Vallance, he came up with the song title because he thought "321" would "make a great title." The song won the SOCAN No. Song 1 Award in 2007.

== Music video ==
The music video for "321" was released on March 31, 2006, and was directed by Sean Michael Turrell. It reached number one on Canada's MuchMusic Countdown in the week of June 9, 2006. The video was nominated for People's Choice: Favorite Canadian Group at the 2006 MuchMusic Video Awards.

== Personnel ==
Credits for "321" adapted from album's liner notes.

Hedley

- Jacob Hoggard – lead vocals
- Dave Rosin – lead guitar, backing vocals
- Tommy Mac – bass
- Chris Crippin – drums

Additional musicians

- Brian Howes – guitar, backing vocals
- Jay Van Poederooyen – percussion

Production

- Brian Howes – producer
- Jay Van Poederooyen – recording, engineering
- Randy Staub – mixing
- Rob Stephanson – assistant recording engineer
- Adam McGhie – assistant recording engineer
- Zach Blackstone – assistant mixing engineer
- Chris Crippin – arrangement

== Charts ==
Chart performance for "321"
Chart (2006)	Peak position
Canada CHR/Pop Top 30 (Radio & Records)	21
Canada CHR/Top 40 (Billboard)	28
