= Trip (Hedley song) =

Single by Hedley

from the album Hedley
- A-side: "On My Own"
- Released: October 4, 2005
- Recorded: 2005
- Genre: Pop punk
- Length: 4:00
- Label: Universal Music Canada
- Songwriters: Chris Crippin; Jacob Hoggard; Tommy Mac; Dave Rosin
- Producer: Brian Howes

Hedley singles chronology
"Villain" (2005)	"Trip" (2005)	"321" (2006)

Music video
- "Trip" on YouTube

"Trip" is a song by Canadian pop rock band Hedley. It was released on October 4, 2005, as the third single from their debut studio album Hedley. The single topped the Canadian MuchMusic Countdown and reached number eleven on the Canadian Singles Chart. It sold close to 3,000 copies. "Trip" appears on the US version of Famous Last Words, which is called Never Too Late.

== Background and composition ==
"Trip" finds Jacob Hoggard displaying an "uncharacteristic sensitivity and beauty." The song was written by Jacob Hoggard, Dave Rosin, Tommy Mac and Chris Crippin, while production was handled by Brian Howes. Howes won Producer of the Year at the 2007 Juno Awards for the song. Musically, the track has been described as a power ballad.

== Music video ==
The music video for "Trip" was shot on November 3, 2005, and was directed by Jack Richardson and Kyle Davidson. The video was released in December 2005.

== Chart performance ==
"Trip" is the second Hedley single to reach the Canadian Singles Chart peaking at number 11. It also reached the Radio & Records Canada CHR/Pop Top 30 chart at number 14 and number 9 on the Canada Hot AC Top 30 chart. The song reached number one on Canada's MuchMusic Countdown on the week of February 17, 2006.

== Awards and nominations ==
Awards and nominations for "Trip"
Year	Organization	Award	Result	Ref(s)
2007	Juno Awards	Producer of the Year	Won	

== Track listing ==
Digital 45 – single
No.	Title	Length
1.	"On My Own" (remix)	3:29
2.	"Trip"	4:00

Digital download – acoustic single
No.	Title	Length
1.	"Trip" (acoustic)	4:01

== Personnel ==
Credits for "Trip" adapted from AllMusic.

Hedley

- Jacob Hoggard – lead vocals
- Dave Rosin – guitar
- Tommy Mac – bass guitar
- Chris Crippin – drums

Additional musicians

- Brian Howes – keyboards
- Jay Van Poederooyen – percussion

Production

- Mike Fraser – engineer, mixing, producer
- Brian Howes – producer
- George Marino – mastering engineer
- Misha Rajaratnam – assistant engineer

== Charts ==
=== Weekly charts ===
Weekly chart performance for "Trip"
Chart (2005–06)	Peak position
Canada (Nielsen Soundscan)	11
Canada CHR/Pop Top 30 (Radio & Records)	14
Canada Hot AC Top 30 (Radio & Records)	9
Canada Hot AC (Billboard)	42

=== Year end charts ===
Year-end performance for "Trip"
Chart (2006)	Position
Canada (Nielsen SoundScan)	44

== Release history ==
Release dates and formats for "Trip"
Region	Date	Format	Version	Label	Ref.
Various	October 4, 2005	Digital download	Main	Universal Music Canada	
Various	August 29, 2006	Digital download	Acoustic	Universal Music Canada	
