= Hedley (album) =

2005 studio album by Hedley

- Canadian standard edition cover

Studio album by Hedley
- Released: September 6, 2005
- Recorded: 2004–2005
- Studios: Armoury Studios (Vancouver, BC); Greenhouse Studios; Hipposonic Studios; Mushroom Studios; The Farm Studios (Gibson's Landing, BC)
- Genres: Alternative rock; pop punk; emo
- Length: 40:33 (Standard edition); 55:40 (Platinum edition)
- Labels: Universal Canada; Capitol
- Producers: Brian Howes; GGGarth

Hedley chronology
Hedley (2005)	Famous Last Words (2007)

Alternative cover
- Platinum edition and US standard edition cover

Singles from Hedley
- 1. "On My Own" Released: July 18, 2005; 2. "Villain" Released: July 26, 2005; 3. "Trip" Released: October 4, 2005; 4. "321" Released: March 31, 2006; 5. "Gunnin'" Released: September 19, 2006; 6. "Street Fight" Released: December 2006

Hedley is the debut studio album by Canadian rock band Hedley, released in Canada on September 6, 2005, through Universal Music Canada. The album reached the top 3 on the Canadian Albums Chart and has been certified double platinum by Music Canada. It garnered a nomination for Rock Album of the Year at the 2006 Juno Awards.

Six tracks were released as singles: "On My Own", "Villain", "Trip", "321", "Gunnin'", and "Street Fight". The music videos for all of these songs, except "Villain" and "Street Fight", reached #1 on the MuchMusic countdown.

Following Hedley signing a US record deal with Capitol Records in the summer of 2006, the album was released in the US on September 26, 2006. In Canada, a "Platinum edition" of the album was released on November 21, 2006, with four bonus tracks and the updated album cover.

Seven of the songs are featured on the 2009 US version of their next album Famous Last Words, released under the title Never Too Late.

== Background and release ==
Hedley first formed in 2003, by frontman Jacob Hoggard with Kevin Giesbrecht, Kevin Heeres, Ryan Federau, and Brandon McKay. Hoggard appeared on the second season of Canadian Idol in 2004, where he placed third. Shortly after, Hedley re-formed with Hoggard as the only original member and was joined by guitarist Dave Rosin, bassist Tommy Mac, and drummer Chris Crippin, all of whom previously teamed in the Vancouver band Everything After. The band picked up attention at the Canadian Music Week 2005 media showcase and, soon after, signed with Universal Music Canada. "Street Fight" was the first song they wrote together, which was part of their five-track demo they sent to the label. The album was recorded at Armoury Studios, Greenhouse Studios, Hipposonic Studios, Mushroom Studios and The Farm Studios in British Columbia, with producers Brian Howes and Garth Richardson.

The album was released on September 6, 2005, through Universal Music Canada. They embarked on a fall 2005 tour across Canada, with support from The Weekend and Faber Drive. They also joined Simple Plan on a 19-city Canadian tour from November to December 2005. The group headlined The Cross Canada tour with MxPx and Faber from February to March 2006. During June 2006, the band went on tour in the US, opening for Yellowcard, with Matchbox Romance. In the summer of 2006, they signed a record deal with Capitol Records, and released their self-titled debut album in the US on September 26, 2006.

== Singles ==
"On My Own" is the first single released from the album on July 18, 2005. The music video premiered on MuchMusic on August 2. The song peaked at number one on the Canadian Singles Chart and earned a nomination for Best Rock Video at the MuchMusic Video Awards in 2006. The video for the song reached number one on the MuchMusic Countdown for the week of December 2, 2005.

"Villain" was released on July 26, 2005, as the second single. The song peaked at number 18 on the Canada Rock chart. Garth Richardson who produced the track, was nominated for a Juno Award for Producer of the Year for the song.

"Trip" was released on October 4, 2005, as the third single. The song peaked at number 11 on the Canadian Singles Chart and won a Juno Award in 2007 for Producer of the Year. The music video for "Trip" topped Canada's MuchMusic Countdown on the week of February 17, 2006.

"321" is the fourth single released on March 31, 2006. The song peaked at number 21 on the Canada CHR/Top 30. The video reached the number one spot on Canada's MuchMusic Countdown on the week of June 9, 2006, and was nominated for People's Choice: Favorite Canadian Group at the 2006 MuchMusic Video Awards.

"Gunnin'" was released on September 19, 2006, as the fifth single. The video reached number one on Canada's MuchMusic Countdown on the week of December 1, 2006. The song won two MuchMusic Video Awards in 2007 for Best Pop Video of the Year and Best Post-Production of the Year.

"Street Fight" was released in December 2006, as the sixth and final single from the album. The video reached number 18 on the Canada's MuchMusic Countdown.

== Critical reception ==
Professional ratings
Review scores
Source	Rating
AllMusic	2/5 stars
Melodic	3.5/5 stars
Starpulse	1.5/5 stars

Hedley was met with mixed reviews by music critics. Corey Apar of AllMusic rated the album two stars out of five and described it as "competent though largely uninteresting." In particular, he criticized the lyrics and the lack of engagement ("Even the... standout tracks... aren't that memorable," writes Apar, "taking a couple spins to really grab listeners at all.") Emilio LV of Melodic called tracks such as "Villain" and "Sink or Swim" as the standout songs. However he criticized the tracks "On My Own", "Street Fight" and "321" as "Simple Plan's way of punk-pop written for easy radio success." Christine Estima of Chart Attack gave a mixed review on the album stating, "Hoggard's lyrics requires some maturity, but you gotta give them props for their singable hooks and endearing party riffs a la Jimmy Eat World."

Despite receiving mixed reviews, it was nominated at the 2006 Juno Awards for Rock Album of the Year. It was also nominated for Album of the Year at the 2007 Juno Awards.

The album went platinum in Canada in December 2005, selling over 100,000 units. In 2008, the album was certified 2× platinum.

== Track listing ==
Standard edition
No.	Title	Writer(s)	Length
1.	"Villain"	Jacob Hoggard; Dave Rosin; Tom MacDonald; Chris Crippin; Dave Genn	4:10
2.	"On My Own"	Brian Howes; Hoggard; Rosin; MacDonald; Crippin	3:39
3.	"Trip"	Howes; Hoggard; Rosin; MacDonald; Crippin	4:00
4.	"Street Fight"	Howes; Hoggard; Rosin; MacDonald; Crippin	3:18
5.	"321"	Howes; Jim Vallance; Hoggard; Rosin; MacDonald; Crippin	3:45
6.	"Gunnin'"	Hoggard; Rosin; MacDonald; Crippin; Genn	4:13
7.	"Sink or Swim"	Genn; Hoggard; Rosin; MacDonald; Crippin	3:25
8.	"Johnny Falls"	Howes; Hoggard; Rosin; MacDonald; Crippin	3:38
9.	"Saturday"	Howes; Hoggard; Rosin; MacDonald; Crippin	3:42
10.	"Sugar Free"	Hoggard; Rosin; MacDonald; Crippin; Genn	3:39
11.	"I Don't Believe It"	Howes; Hoggard; Rosin; MacDonald; Crippin	3:01
Total length:			40:33

Platinum edition (bonus tracks)
No.	Title	Writer(s)	Length
12.	"Daddy-O" (B-Side)	Hoggard; Rosin; MacDonald; Crippin; Genn	3:28
13.	"On My Own" (Remix)	Howes; Hoggard; Rosin; MacDonald; Crippin	3:29
14.	"Trip" (Acoustic)	Howes; Hoggard; Rosin; MacDonald; Crippin	3:56
15.	"Gunnin'" (Full Mix)	Hoggard; Rosin; MacDonald; Crippin; Genn	4:13
Total length:			55:40

== Personnel ==
Credits for Hedley adapted from album's liner notes.

Hedley

- Jacob Hoggard – lead vocals
- Dave Rosin – guitar, backing vocals
- Tommy Mac – bass guitar, backing vocals
- Chris Crippin – drums, backing vocals

Additional musicians

- Dave Genn – guitar
- Brian Howes – guitar, keyboards, backing vocals
- Ben Kaplan – guitar

Production

- Garnet Armstrong – art direction, design
- Zach Blackstone – assistant
- Mike Cashin – assistant
- Paul Forgues – guitar engineer
- Mike Fraser – mixing
- GGGarth – producer
- Darren Gilmore – management
- Brian Howes – producer
- Ben Kaplan – digital editing, programming
- Dean Maher – engineer
- George Marino – mastering
- Adam McGhie – assistant engineer
- James Morin – assistant
- Ivan Otis – photography
- Shawn Penner – assistant
- Misha Rajaratnam – digital editing
- Randy Staub – mixing
- Rob Stephanson – assistant engineer
- Jim Vallance – composer

== Charts ==
=== Weekly charts ===
Weekly chart performance for Hedley
Chart (2005)	Peak position
Canadian Albums (Billboard)	3
Canadian Alternative Albums (Nielsen)	14

=== Year end charts ===
Year-end performance for Hedley
Chart (2005)	Peak position
Canadian Albums (Billboard)	65

== Certifications ==
Certification for Hedley
Region	Certification	Certified units/sales
Canada (Music Canada)	2× Platinum	200,000^{^}
^{^} Shipments figures based on certification alone.

== Release history ==
Region	Date	Format	Edition	Label	Ref.
Canada	September 6, 2005	CD; digital download	Standard	Universal Canada	
United States	September 26, 2006	CD	Standard	Capitol	
Canada	November 21, 2006	CD; digital download	Platinum	Universal Canada	
