= List of number-one singles of 2005 (Canada) =

The following lists the number one best-selling singles in Canada in 2005 which was published in Billboard magazine under the Hits of the World section. Only songs released as physical singles qualified for this chart during this time. During this period, the singles market in Canada was very limited in both scope and availability and, in many cases, these songs received little or no radio support. For tracks other than those by American Idol or Canadian Idol winners, sales were likely to be less than 1,000 per week. Nevertheless, this was the only singles chart Canadians had until June 2007, when the Canadian Hot 100 was released to the public. It also lists other big hits in the sales chart.

Note that Billboard publishes charts with an issue date approximately 7–10 days in advance.

== Chart history ==
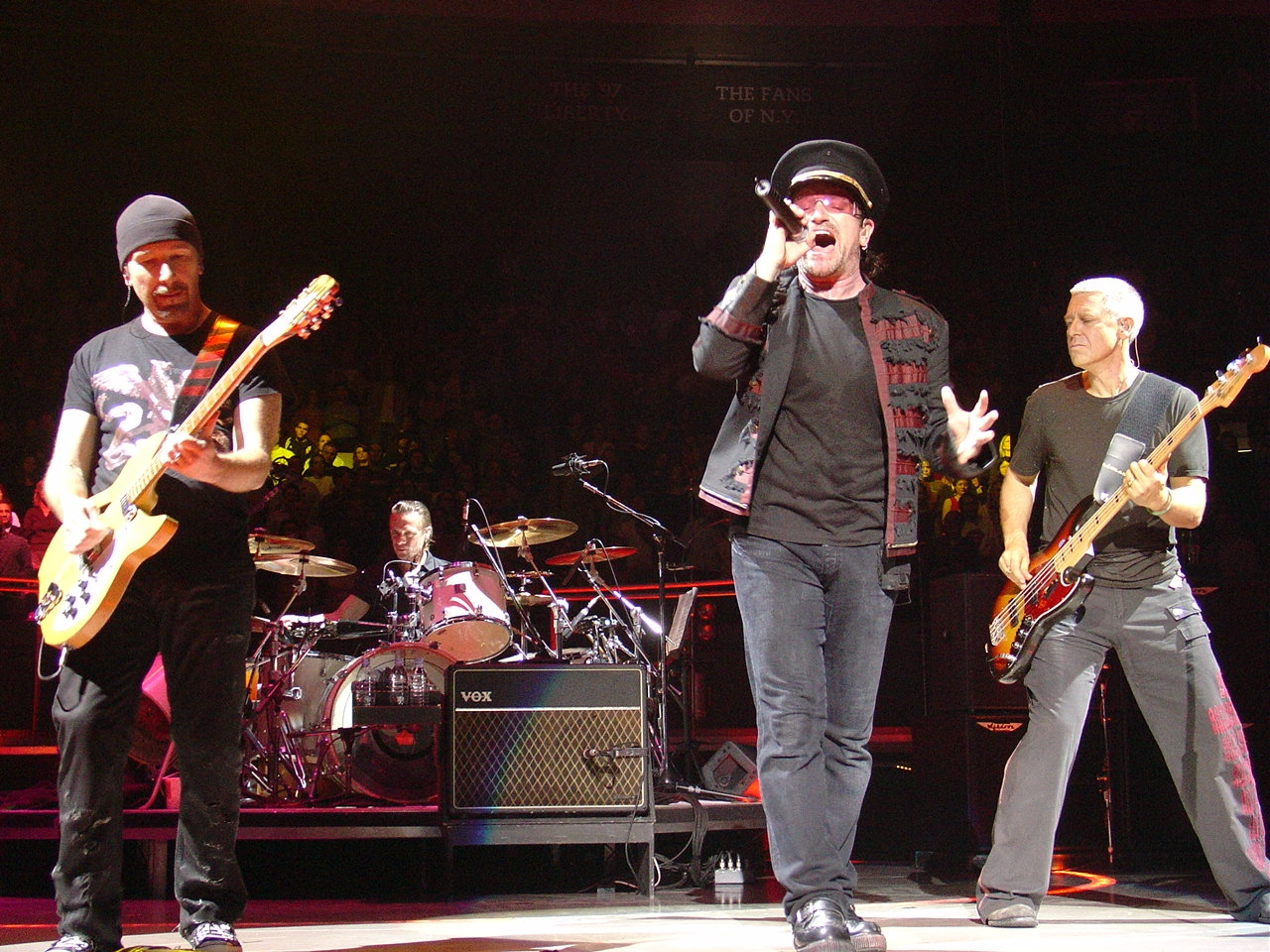
U2's "All Because of You" spent 5 non-consecutive weeks at number-one, where it was then replaced by the band's "Sometimes You Can't Make It On Your Own", which spent another 3 weeks at number-one.

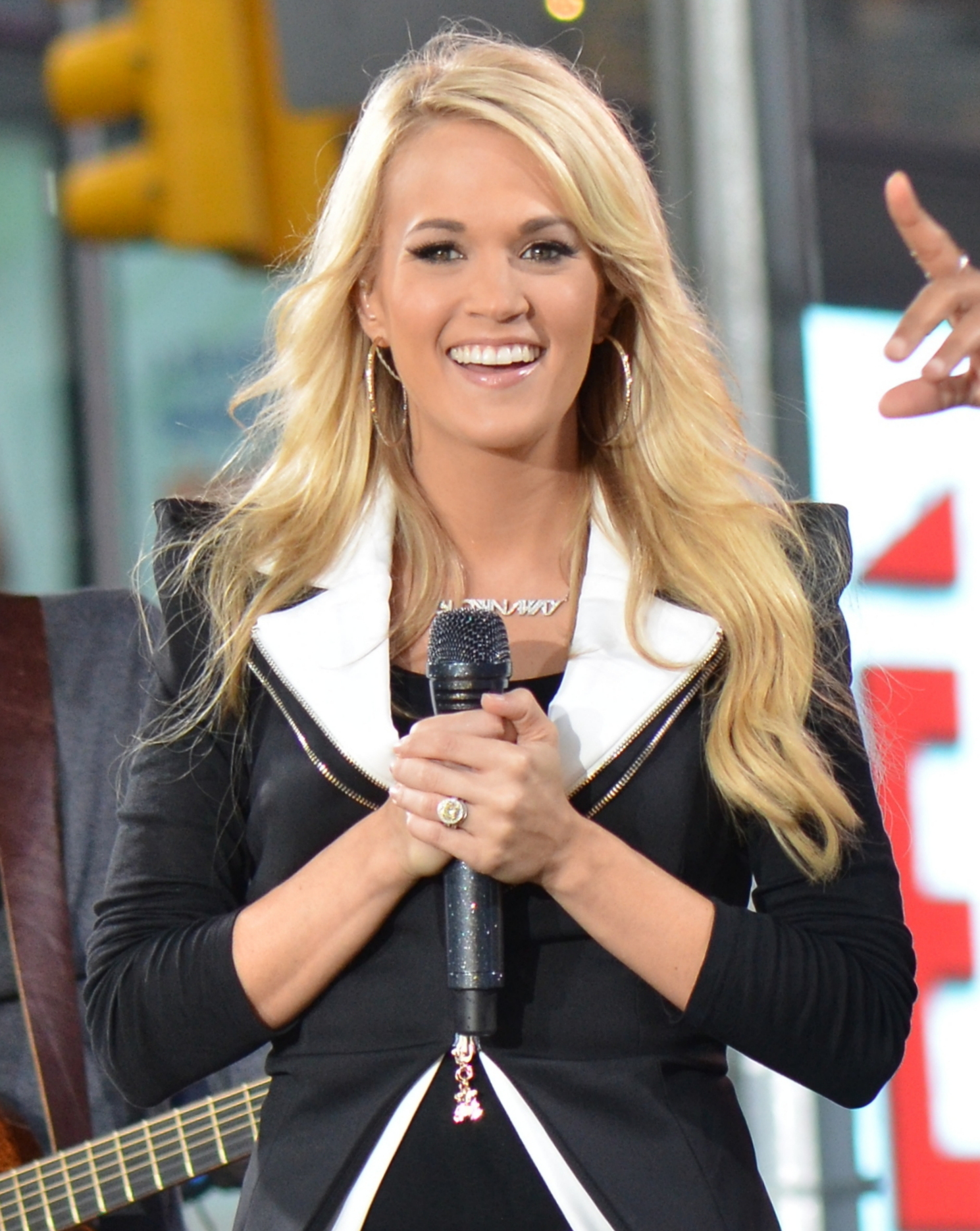
Carrie Underwood had her only number-one song in Canada to date with "Inside Your Heaven" which spent 7 weeks at number-one.

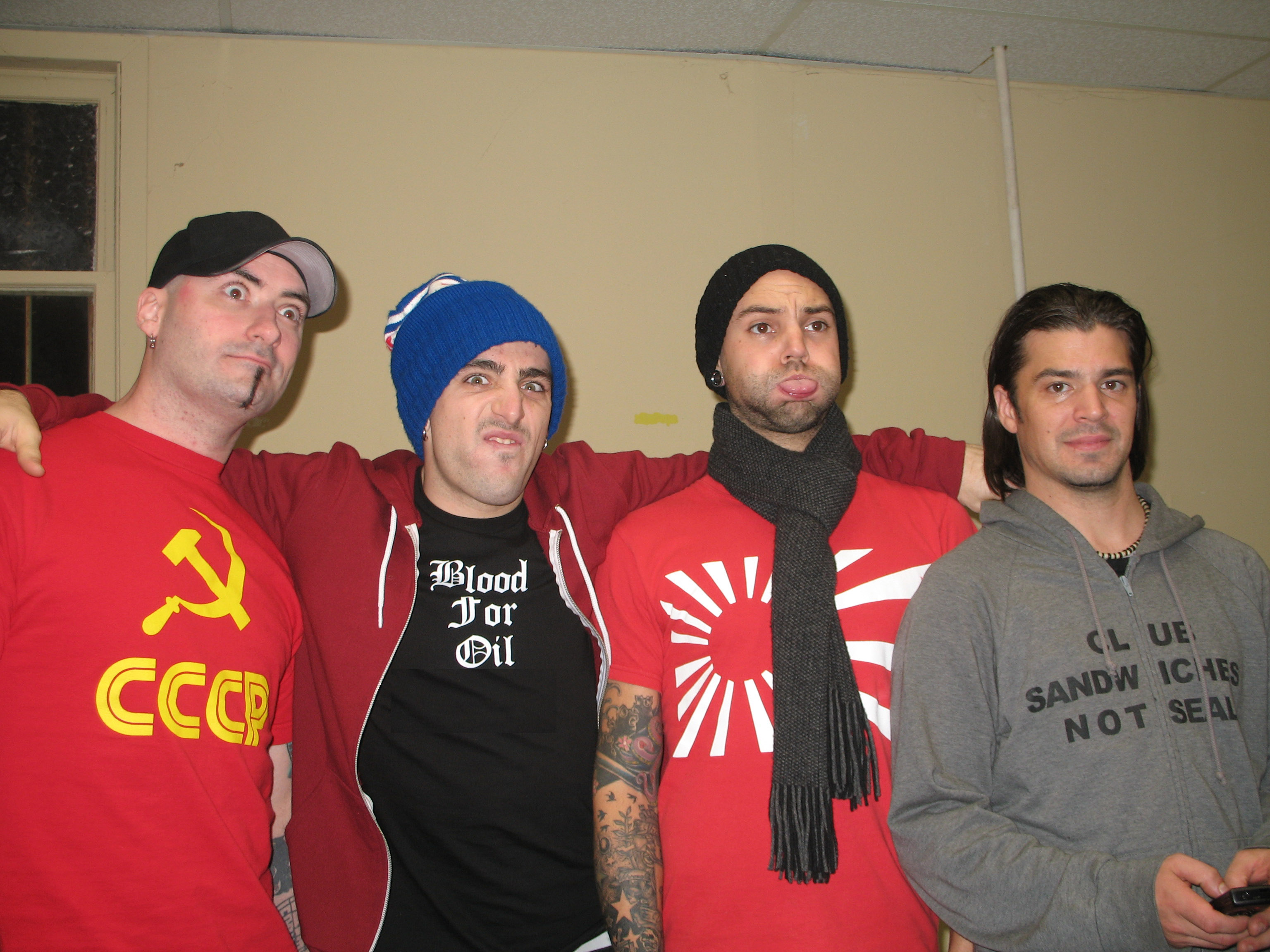
Canadian group Hedley scored their first number-one hit with "On My Own" which spent one week at number-one in mid-2005.

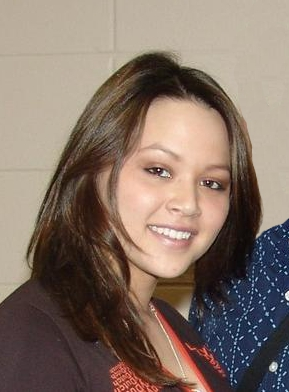
Canadian Idol winner Melissa O'Neil had the longest number-one song of 2005 with "Alive". The song spent 9 weeks at number-one.

Issue date	Title	Artist(s)	Ref.
January 1	"Do They Know It's Christmas?"	Band Aid 20	
January 8	"Do They Know It's Christmas?"	Band Aid 20	
January 15	"Do They Know It's Christmas?"	Band Aid 20	
January 22	"My Boo"	Usher & Alicia Keys	
January 29	"My Boo"	Usher & Alicia Keys	
February 5	"My Boo"	Usher & Alicia Keys	
February 12	"My Boo"	Usher & Alicia Keys	
February 19	"My Boo"	Usher & Alicia Keys	
February 26	"All Because of You"	U2	
March 5	"All Because of You"	U2	
March 12	"All Because of You"	U2	
March 19	"Paper Rain"	Amanda Stott	
March 26	"Paper Rain"	Amanda Stott	
April 2	"You're in My Heart (Little Pretty)"	Peppers Ghost	
April 9	"All Because of You"	U2	
April 16	"All Because of You"	U2	
April 23	"Sometimes You Can't Make It on Your Own"	U2	
April 30	"Sometimes You Can't Make It on Your Own"	U2	
May 7	"Sometimes You Can't Make It on Your Own"	U2	
May 14	"When You Tell Me That You Love Me"	American Idol Season 4 Finalists	
May 21	"When You Tell Me That You Love Me"	American Idol Season 4 Finalists	
May 28	"When You Tell Me That You Love Me"	American Idol Season 4 Finalists	
June 4	"When You Tell Me That You Love Me"	American Idol Season 4 Finalists	
June 11	"When You Tell Me That You Love Me"	American Idol Season 4 Finalists	
June 18	"When You Tell Me That You Love Me"	American Idol Season 4 Finalists	
June 25	"Blue Orchid"	The White Stripes	
July 2	"Inside Your Heaven"	Carrie Underwood	
July 9	"Inside Your Heaven"	Carrie Underwood	
July 16	"Inside Your Heaven"	Carrie Underwood	
July 23	"Inside Your Heaven"	Carrie Underwood	
July 30	"Inside Your Heaven"	Carrie Underwood	
August 6	"Inside Your Heaven"	Carrie Underwood	
August 13	"Inside Your Heaven"	Carrie Underwood	
August 20	"On My Own"	Hedley	
August 27	"Don't Cha"	The Pussycat Dolls featuring Busta Rhymes	
September 3	"Don't Cha"	The Pussycat Dolls featuring Busta Rhymes	
September 10	"Don't Cha"	The Pussycat Dolls featuring Busta Rhymes	
September 17	"Don't Cha"	The Pussycat Dolls featuring Busta Rhymes	
September 24	"Don't Cha"	The Pussycat Dolls featuring Busta Rhymes	
October 1	"Don't Cha"	The Pussycat Dolls featuring Busta Rhymes	
October 8	"Don't Cha"	The Pussycat Dolls featuring Busta Rhymes	
October 15	"Don't Cha"	The Pussycat Dolls featuring Busta Rhymes	
October 22	"Alive"	Melissa O'Neil	
October 29	"Alive"	Melissa O'Neil	
November 5	"Alive"	Melissa O'Neil	
November 12	"Alive"	Melissa O'Neil	
November 19	"Alive"	Melissa O'Neil	
November 26	"Alive"	Melissa O'Neil	
December 3	"Alive"	Melissa O'Neil	
December 10	"Hung Up"	Madonna	
December 17	"Hung Up"	Madonna	
December 24	"Alive"	Melissa O'Neil	
December 31	"Alive"	Melissa O'Neil	
