= On My Own (Hedley song) =

Single by Hedley

from the album Hedley
- B-side: "Johnny Falls"; "Trip"
- Released: July 18, 2005
- Recorded: 2005
- Genre: Pop punk; rock
- Length: 3:39
- Label: Universal Music Canada
- Songwriters: Chris Crippin; Jacob Hoggard; Tommy Mac; Dave Rosin
- Producer: Brian Howes

Hedley singles chronology
"On My Own" (2005)	"Villain" (2005)

Music video
- "On My Own" on YouTube

"On My Own" is a song by Canadian rock group Hedley. It was released on July 18, 2005, as the lead single from their debut studio album Hedley. The song peaked at number one on the Canadian Singles Chart. It was also the only single released in the United States from that album, serviced to alternative radio on July 10, 2006, and contemporary hit radio on July 24. "On My Own" is featured on the US release of Famous Last Words.

== Background ==
"On My Own" is a melodic rock track, featuring vocals described as nasal and earnest from frontman Jacob Hoggard. Speaking about the song's meaning, Hoggard stated that it is about "a new life and a new beginning." The song was used in the 2006 strategy video game, Thrillville.

"On My Own" was written by Chris Crippin, Jacob Hoggard, Tommy Mac and Dave Rosin, while production was handled by Brian Howes.

== Music video ==
The music video for "On My Own" premiered on MuchMusic on August 2, 2005. It was directed by Sean Michael Turrell. The video reached number one on the MuchMusic Countdown for the week of December 2, 2005. It was nominated at the 2006 MuchMusic Video Awards in the category for "Best Rock Video" but lost to Nickelback's "Photograph".

== Track listing ==
Digital download – single
No.	Title	Length
1.	"On My Own"	3:39
2.	"Johnny Falls"	3:38

Digital 45 – single
No.	Title	Length
1.	"On My Own (Remix)"	3:29
2.	"Trip"	4:00

== Personnel ==
Credits for "On My Own" adapted from album's liner notes.

Hedley

- Jacob Hoggard – lead vocals
- Dave Rosin – guitar, backing vocals
- Tommy Mac – bass guitar, backing vocals
- Chris Crippin – drums, backing vocals

Additional musicians

- Brian Howes – guitar, keyboards, backing vocals
- Jay Van Poederooyen – percussion

Production

- Brian Howes – producer
- Jay Van Poederooyen – editing
- Rob Stephanson – assistant recording engineer
- Adam McGhie – assistant recording engineer
- Randy Staub – mixing
- Zach Blackstone – assistant mixing

== Charts ==
=== Weekly charts ===
Weekly chart performance for "On My Own"
Chart (2005)	Peak position
Canada (Nielsen SoundScan)	1
Canada CHR/Pop Top 30 (Radio & Records)	22
Canada Hot AC Top 30 (Radio & Records)	20

=== Year end charts ===
Year-end performance for "On My Own"
Chart (2005)	Position
Canada (Nielsen SoundScan)	11

== Release history ==
Region	Date	Format	Label	Ref.
Canada	July 18, 2005	Contemporary hit radio	Universal Canada	
Canada	July 19, 2005	Digital download	Universal Canada	
Canada	August 2, 2005	CD	Universal Canada	
United States	July 10, 2006	Alternative radio	Capitol	
United States	July 24, 2006	Contemporary hit radio	Capitol	

== See also ==
- List of number-one singles of 2005 (Canada)
