= Kevin Williams (music producer) =

Canadian music producer and keyboardist (born 1956)

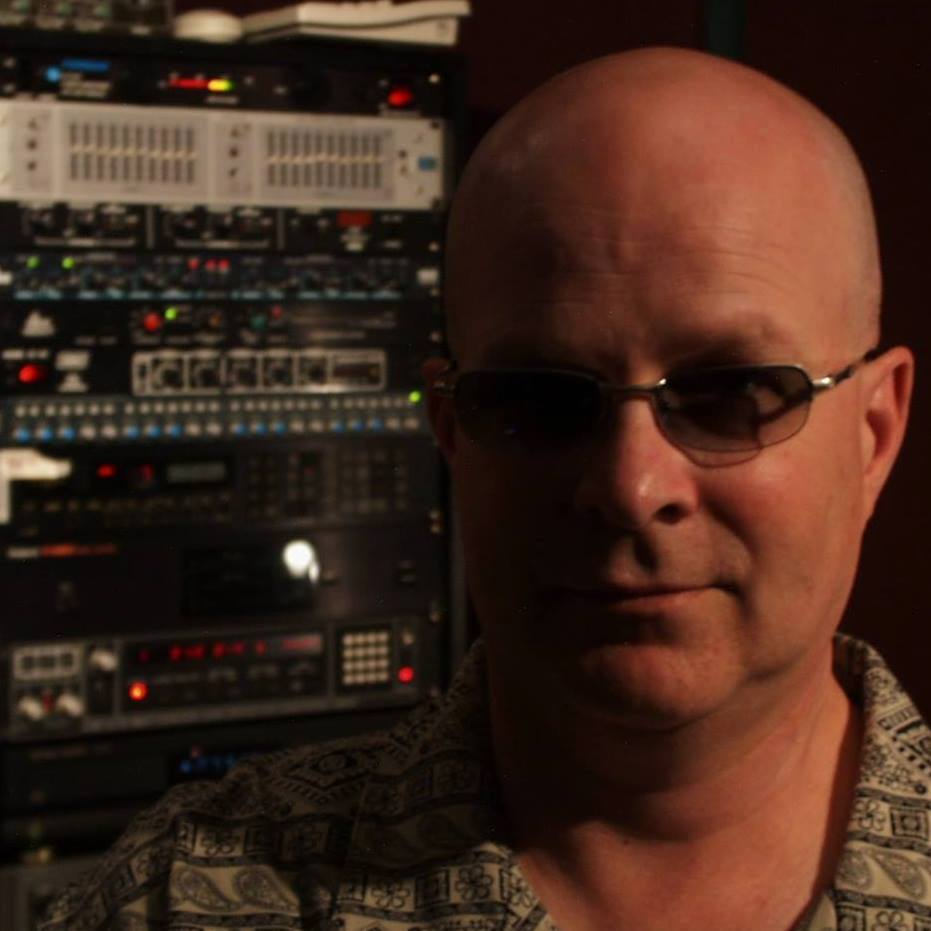
- Williams in 2019
- Born: Kevin Ernest Williams; March 19, 1956 (age 70); North Vancouver, Canada
- Occupations: Record producer, musician

Kevin Ernest Williams (born March 19, 1956) is a Canadian music producer, keyboardist, audio engineer, and educational administrator with over 25 years experience within the post-secondary education system. He is the co-founder and partner of Sessionwire Communications Inc.

== Early life ==
Williams was born in North Vancouver, British Columbia, Canada on March 19, 1956.

== Hot Sole Music ==
In 1994, Williams started his own audio engineering school and recording studio, Hot Sole Music Inc., which he would own and manage until 2008.

== Nimbus School of Recording Arts ==
Taking the curriculum and experience he had developed through Hot Sole, Williams partnered with Bob Ezrin and Garth Richardson to co-found Nimbus School of Recording Arts.

== Sessionwire ==
In early 2015, Williams joined forces with Robin Leboe to co-found Sessionwire Communications Inc. Sessionwire is a synchronized music and audio collaboration platform for composers, musicians, and audio professionals on the web.
