= Wild Life (Hedley album) =

Studio album by Hedley
- Released: November 11, 2013 (CAN)
- Recorded: 2012–2013
- Studios: Anew Tunes Studios; Fader Mountain Sound (Vancouver, BC); The Armoury Studio (Vancouver, BC); The Lair (Los Angeles, CA); The Roost Studios (Santa Monica, CA); Van Howes Studios (Los Angeles, CA)
- Genre: Pop rock
- Length: 37:23
- Labels: Universal Music Canada; Capitol Records (US)
- Producers: Brian Howes; Jacob Hoggard

Hedley chronology
Storms (2011)	Wild Life (2013)	Hello (2015)

Singles from Wild Life
- 1. "Anything" Released: August 19, 2013; 2. "Crazy for You" Released: January 10, 2014; 3. "Heaven in Our Headlights" Released: June 17, 2014; 4. "Pocket Full of Dreams" Released: November 18, 2014

Wild Life is the fifth studio album by Canadian pop/rock band Hedley. It was released via Universal Music Canada on November 11, 2013, in Canada, while the album was via Capitol Records in the US on May 19, 2014. The album debuted and peaked at No. 4 on the Canadian Albums Chart. It sold 64,000 copies in Canada in 2013. Wild Life was certified Platinum by Music Canada on March 10, 2014.

== Background and recording ==
The album was recorded at Anew Tunes Studios, Fader Mountain Sound and The Armoury Studio in Vancouver, The Lair and Van Howes Studios in Los Angeles, and The Roost Studios in Santa Monica. It was produced by Jacob Hoggard and Brian Howes.

Guitarist Dave Rosin described the album as "music for good times." He told Vancouver Sun that the album was about positivity, appreciating "the little things around you" and "finding a way to always see the light at the end of the tunnel." According to Hoggard, the group spent months writing and experimenting with different sounds, such as using old analog synths, which he said "found lots of inspiration" from. Writing about 50 songs for the album, Hoggard said they avoided having the songs "sound like the same thing." "Crazy for You" has been described as disco, while the album showcases a melancholy side on "Pocket Full Of Dreams" and the hopeful "Wild Life".

== Release ==
On October 11, 2013, the group announced the track list for Wild Life, with a release date for November 11. The band embarked on their headlining Wild Live Tour across Canada from February to April 2014. The album was released in the US on May 19, 2014, via Capitol Records.

== Singles ==
The album's lead single and lead track "Anything" was released on August 19, 2013, and the music video premiered on September 10. The song peaked at number 5 on the Billboard Canadian Hot 100. It also reached number 6 on both the Canada AC and Canada CHR/Top 40 charts, and number 8 on the Canada Hot AC chart. The song has sold 90,000 digital copies.

The second track "Crazy for You" was released as a promotional single on October 22, 2013, and as the second official single from Wild Life on January 10, 2014. It was also released to hot adult contemporary radio in the US on March 17, 2014. A music video for the song premiered February 14, 2014. The song has peaked at No. 7 on the Canadian Hot 100 and within the top 10 on the CHR, Hot AC, and AC radio formats and has sold 166,000 digital copies. The music video stars actress Aurelia Scheppers.

The seventh track "Heaven in Our Headlights" was issued to radio as the third official single from the album on June 17, 2014, while the music video premiered later that week on June 19. It peaked at number 14 on the Canadian Hot 100. The song reached number 5 on the Canada AC, number 8 on the Canada CHR/Top 40 and number 4 on the Canada Hot AC charts. The song sold 82,000 digital copies in 2014.

The fifth track "Pocket Full of Dreams" was announced as the fourth single from the album on November 18, 2014. The band uploaded an official lyric video to YouTube on the same day. The song peaked at number 33 on the Canadian Hot 100 and at number 18 on the Canada CHR/Top 40. It also reached number 10 on both the Canada AC and Hot AC charts.

== Reception ==
Professional ratings
Review scores
Source	Rating
AllMusic	3/5 stars
Confront Magazine	4.75/5 stars
Melodic	3/5 stars
Montreal Gazette	3/5 stars

Wild Life was met with generally positive reviews from music critics. Stephen Thomas Erlewine of AllMusic gave the album a three out of five star rating. He compared the album's second track, "Crazy for You" to Daft Punk's "Get Lucky". He stated, "Hedley's blatant desire to have a hit by any means necessary is tawdry but endearing because there is so much gloss here even the songs that aren't quite as potent sound alluring due to the big-budget slickness." Johan Wippsson of Melodic called the album "a little too polished and radio-friendly" and drew a comparison to the likes of OneRepublic, Train, and Parallel. However, he praised the tracks "Mexico" and "All the Way". The Montreal Gazette complimented the first track "Anything" for its catchiness. Renowned for Sound remarked, "the voice of Jacob Hoggard somehow always manages to truly give off the vibe of being fed up, happy, longing or insecure. Likewise, the vocals and many sounds of the likes of Dave Rosin, Tommy Mac and Chris Crippin help to shape this album into a very memorable one. Jenia Schukov of Confront Magazine wrote, "With this being the fifth studio album from Hedley, most would assume that new material would be difficult for the group but they seem to welcome this challenge with open arms. As their previous record Storms did, Wild Life draws on personal experiences and hardships for inspiration. Lyrically, Hoggard is unmatched as he tells stories throughout the songs in a way that very few can."

The album earned two Juno Award nominations for Pop Album of the Year in 2014, and Album of the Year in 2015.

== Track listing ==
Standard edition
No.	Title	Writer(s)	Length
1.	"Anything"	Jacob Hoggard, Brian Howes, Jason Van Poederooyen	3:11
2.	"Crazy for You"	Hoggard, Howes, Van Pooderooyen	3:37
3.	"Headphones"	Hoggard, Howes, Ryan Petersen, Nolan Sipe	3:33
4.	"I'll Be With You"	Hoggard, Lucas Banker, Patrick Nissley, Matt Squire	3:10
5.	"Pocket Full of Dreams"	Hoggard, BC Jean, Rune Westberg	3:43
6.	"Mexico"	Hoggard, Adrian Newman	3:45
7.	"Heaven in Our Headlights"	Hoggard, Howes, Nolan Sipe	3:09
8.	"Dreaming's For Sleeping"	Hoggard, Howes, Nolan Sipe	3:15
9.	"Wild Life"	Hoggard	3:05
10.	"Got Love"	Hoggard, Jean, Westberg	3:20
11.	"All the Way"	Hoggard	3:35

Deluxe edition
No.	Title	Writer(s)	Length
12.	"Top of the World"	Hoggard, Howes, Van Poederooyen	3:54
13.	"Beautiful Girl"	Hoggard, Tony Dixon, Kenny Edmonds	4:09
14.	"Parade Rain"	Hoggard, Thomas "Tawgs" Salter, Mike Wise	3:40
15.	"Almost Over"	Hoggard, Jimmy Harry	3:28

Digital version bonus tracks
No.	Title	Writer(s)	Length
16.	"Wild Life" (Twice As Nice Remix)	Hoggard	2:57

== Personnel ==
Credits adapted from album's liner notes.

Hedley

- Jacob Hoggard – vocals, acoustic guitar, keyboard, piano, banjo, Moog synthesizer
- Dave Rosin – guitar, background vocals
- Tommy Mac – bass, background vocals
- Chris Crippin – drums, background vocals

Additional musicians

- Adrian Newman – guitar, keyboard
- Alex Barnes – vocals
- BC Jean – backing vocals
- Ben Kaplan – keyboard
- Brian Howes – guitar, keyboard, backing vocals
- Jason "JVP" Van Poederooyen – guitar, keyboard
- Kate Morgan – vocals
- Madison Godfrey – vocals
- Matt Squire – guitar, keyboard
- Nolan Sipe – guitar
- Sal Ferreras – percussion

Production

- Jacob Hoggard – producer, programming
- Brian Howes – producer, vocal producer
- Adrian Newman – engineer, programming, vocal producer
- Ben Kaplan – engineer, programming, vocal engineer
- Christopher Midgley – assistant engineer, assistant vocal engineer
- Garnet Armstrong – art direction, design
- Jason "JVP" Van Poederooyen – digital editing, engineer, mixing, programming, vocal engineer
- Jason Darbyson – art direction, design
- Matt Squire – programming
- Misha Rajaratnam – editing, programming, string arrangements
- Nolan Sipe – engineer, programming
- Paul Dutil – assistant engineer
- Rune Westberg – engineer
- Ryan Peterson – editing, programming
- Shawn Marino – A&R
- Ted Jensen – mastering

== Charts ==
=== Weekly charts ===
Weekly chart performance for Wild Life
Chart (2013–14)	Peak position
Canadian Albums (Billboard)	4

=== Year-end charts ===
Year-end performance for Wild Life
Chart (2014)	Peak position
Canadian Albums (Billboard)	16

== Certifications ==
Certifications and sales for Wild Life
Region	Certification	Certified units/sales
Canada (Music Canada)	Platinum	80,000^{^}
^{^} Shipments figures based on certification alone.

== Release history ==
Release history and formats for Wild Life
Region	Date	Label	Format	Ref.
Canada	November 11, 2013	Universal Music Canada	CD, digital download	
Oman	May 16, 2014	Universal Music Canada	CD, digital download	
Germany	May 16, 2014	Universal Music Canada	CD, digital download	
United States	May 19, 2014	Capitol Records	CD, digital download	
