= Garth Richardson =

Canadian record producer (born 1960)

- Born: 1959 or 1960 (age 66–67); Toronto, Ontario, Canada
- Other names: GGGarth; GGGarthatron
- Occupations: Record producer; sound engineer; composer
- Years active: 1979–present
- Father: Jack Richardson
- Website: gggarth.com

Garth Richardson (born c. 1960), known professionally as GGGarth, is a Canadian record producer and sound engineer. He is the son of music producer Jack Richardson.

He has worked with such musical acts as Red Hot Chili Peppers, Mötley Crüe, Nickelback, Rage Against the Machine, L7, Mudvayne, Melvins, Biffy Clyro, Chevelle, Kittie, Shihad, 54-40, Hedley, Rise Against, and Spineshank.

He co-founded the Nimbus School of Recording Arts in Vancouver with producer Bob Ezrin and established his personal recording studio, the Farm, in Gibsons, British Columbia. He and five partners opened Fader Mountain Sound, a sound studio and rehearsal space that took over the space formerly occupied by the famed Little Mountain Sound Studios in Vancouver. Richardson also created the Bandwagon, a portable recording studio used for music therapy by patients at British Columbia Children's Hospital and other facilities in the Lower Mainland of BC that cater to teens and adults.

He has been nominated for a Grammy, a Mercury Prize, and three Juno Awards, winning the Juno Award for Producer of the Year in 1997.

== Early life ==
Richardson was born in Toronto and is the son of Jack Richardson, a prominent music producer who worked with notable acts including Alice Cooper, the Guess Who, and Bob Seger in the 1960s and 1970s.

From the age of five, Richardson would visit his father at his Toronto studio, Nimbus 9, and was inspired to follow in his footsteps. He started working as the studio's janitor at the age of 14. At 15 years of age, he worked as a second engineer on Seger's "Night Moves", which was produced by his father.

Richardson was athletic as a child, participating in hockey, football, and skiing. He attended Georges Vanier Secondary School and would work at Nimbus 9 at night. He later enrolled in Fanshawe College's Music Industry Arts program but chose to leave before completing his diploma, preferring the hands-on experience at his father's studio. His first production credit came in 1979 with Ad Up, an album by Numbers, a short-lived Toronto-based band.

== Career ==
=== Production work ===
In the 1980s Richardson landed a job at Phase One Studios in Toronto. Three years in, he was invited by producer Michael Wagener to work with him in Los Angeles for six months. Richardson left for LA in 1984 and stayed there for 12 years.

Richardson was an assistant engineer on the 1987 White Lion album, Pride, produced by Wagener. His first big break was engineering the Red Hot Chili Peppers' Mother's Milk (1989). He was credited as "GGGarthatron" on the album and initially planned to use the name for his next project with a band called the Power Trio from Hell. However, the band believed it would bring bad luck and instead opted for "GGGarth", a name they considered to be lucky due to its seven-letter composition. Richardson adopted the moniker, in reference to his stutter, and continued to use "GGGarth" as his professional credit on several subsequent projects.

He produced Rage Against the Machine's 1992 self-titled debut studio album, which earned him a nomination for the Grammy Award for Best Engineered Album, Non-Classical at the 36th Annual Grammy Awards.

He mixed and produced several tracks on the Melvins' 1993 album, Houdini, co-produced their 1994 release Stoner Witch, and served as engineer and mixer on tracks from their 1996 album, Stag. Richardson also produced the 1996 album Shot by the Jesus Lizard, and the following year, he was awarded the Juno Award for Producer of the Year for his work on the singles "Bar-X-the Rocking M" from Stag and "Mailman" from Shot.

The band L7 chose Richardson to co-produce their 1994 album, Hungry for Stink, because of his work with the guitar sound on albums by Melvins and Rage Against the Machine. He mixed the Tommy Lee single "Planet Boom" from the Mötley Crüe EP Quaternary (1994) as well as the acoustic version of Nickelback's "Leader of Men", which was appeared on their 1998 album, The State.

Richardson produced 54-40's 1998 album, Since When. Both the album and its title track were the highest-charting album and single in the band's history. Since When peaked at No. 19 on the RPM Top 100 Albums chart, and the single peaked at No. 2 on RPM's Alternative 30 chart and No. 11 on their 100 Hit Tracks chart. Richardson also produced three tracks on the band's 2018 album, Keep On Walking.

He produced Kittie's debut album, Spit (1998), and Shihad's The General Electric (1999).

In 2000, Richardson co-produced Mudvayne's debut album, L.D. 50.

In 2003, he received a Juno nomination for Producer of the Year for his work on the songs "Family System" and "The Red" from Chevelle's Wonder What's Next. The prize had been renamed the Jack Richardson Producer of the Year Award in 2002 in honour of his father.

Richardson produced Siren Song of the Counter Culture (2004) by Rise Against, the band's first album on a major record label.

He received his third Juno nomination for Producer of the Year in 2006, for his work on the singles "Gunnin'" and "Villain" by Hedley, from their self-titled debut album.

Richardson has produced three albums by the Scottish rock band Biffy Clyro: Puzzle (2007), Only Revolutions (2009), and Opposites (2013). In 2010, he was nominated for a Mercury Prize for his work on Only Revolutions.

=== The Farm Studios ===
In 2002, Richardson began developing his own personal recording facility on a seven-acre property in Gibsons, a town situated on the Sunshine Coast of British Columbia, approximately 45 kilometers from Vancouver. He lives on the property, which also includes accommodations for artists recording on-site.

The recording studio was designed in collaboration with Ron Obvious, who also contributed to the design of Bryan Adams' Warehouse Studio and Armoury Studios in Vancouver. Additionally, Richardson installed cables into the woods of his property, enabling musicians to record outdoors.

=== Nimbus School of Recording Arts ===
In 2008, Richardson co-founded the Nimbus School of Recording Arts alongside producers Bob Ezrin and Kevin Williams. The school was named after Nimbus 9, the Toronto studio operated by Richardson's father. Ezrin had apprenticed under the elder Richardson during the 1970s.

The school provided diploma programs in audio engineering, live sound mixing and recording, and advanced studio production. Students who completed one year of training were also eligible to apply to Capilano University to pursue a degree.

The school closed in 2023. Richardson told the Vancouver Sun, "It was a perfect storm of COVID-19, student visa trouble and increased property taxes that forced us to close."

=== Bandwagon ===
In collaboration with the Music Therapy Ride—an annual motorcycle charity event that raises funds for music therapy services in British Columbia—Richardson developed a mobile recording studio known as the Bandwagon, designed to be brought directly to a patient's hospital bedside. Initially conceived in 2010, the first Bandwagon was installed at BC Children's Hospital in 2012. A second unit was created in 2013, serving multiple facilities across the Lower Mainland that support long-term care patients, individuals with dementia, and hospitalized teenagers.

Richardson was inspired to create the Bandwagon after spending time with his daughter at BC Children's Hospital, where he witnessed firsthand the positive impact of the hospital's music therapy program on patients. The mobile studio enables patients to record their own music with the support of on-site music therapists and is equipped with professional-grade microphones, keyboards, and guitars.

=== Fader Mountain Sound ===
In 2012, Richardson launched Fader Mountain Sound studios in partnership with Ben Kaplan, Shawn Cole, Kevin Kowai, Daniel Byrne, and Paul Boechler. Kaplan previously collaborated with Richardson at both the Farm and the Nimbus School of Recording Arts. Fader Mountain Sound was founded in the former premises of Little Mountain Sound Studios, a legendary facility closely linked to iconic producers Bruce Fairbairn and Bob Rock.

Richardson left Fader Mountain Sound in 2016, moving his equipment back to the Farm Studios.

== Personal life ==
Richardson has two brothers and two sisters. While still living in Los Angeles, he met his first wife during a six-month trip to Montreal, where he was working with Dead Brain Cells. The couple settled in Los Angeles and had two daughters. They relocated to Vancouver after one of their daughters faced a serious health issue that wasn't covered by their insurance. Richardson chose Vancouver over Toronto, believing the city offered better opportunities in the music industry at the time.

Richardson remarried in 2007.

He received an honorary Doctor of Letters from Capilano University in 2025.

== Selected production credits ==
| Year | Artist | Album | Notes/ref. |
|---|---|---|---|
| 1988 | Sword | Sweet Dreams | Co-produced with Jack Richardson |
| 1991 | The Scream | Man in the Moon | Co-produced with Eddie Kramer |
| 1992 | Rage Against the Machine | Rage Against the Machine | |
| 1993 | Melvins | Houdini | Co-produced with Melvins and Kurt Cobain |
| 1994 | L7 | Hungry for Stink | |
| 1994 | Surgery | Shimmer | |
| 1994 | Testament | Low | |
| 1995 | Ugly Kid Joe | Menace to Sobriety | |
| 1995 | Voodoo Glow Skulls | Firme | |
| 1996 | Melvins | Stag | Co-produced with Melvins and Joe Barresi |
| 1996 | The Jesus Lizard | Shot | |
| 1996 | Skunk Anansie | Stoosh | |
| 1997 | Kerbdog | On the Turn | |
| 1997 | Sick of It All | Built to Last | |
| 1998 | The Urge | Master of Styles | |
| 1999 | Shihad | The General Electric | |
| 1999 | The O.C. Supertones | Chase the Sun | |
| 1999 | Kittie | Spit | |
| 2000 | Project 86 | Drawing Black Lines | |
| 2000 | Mudvayne | L.D. 50 | |
| 2000 | Spineshank | The Height of Callousness | |
| 2001 | Kittie | Oracle | |
| 2001 | 40 Below Summer | Invitation to the Dance | |
| 2001 | Puya | Union | |
| 2002 | Chevelle | Wonder What's Next | |
| 2002 | Downthesun | Downthesun | |
| 2002 | Trapt | Trapt | |
| 2003 | Beloved | Failure On | |
| 2003 | Spineshank | Self-Destructive Pattern | |
| 2003 | Spoken | A Moment of Imperfect Clarity | |
| 2003 | From Autumn to Ashes | The Fiction We Live | |
| 2004 | Atreyu | The Curse | |
| 2004 | Rise Against | Siren Song of the Counter Culture | |
| 2005 | From Autumn to Ashes | Abandon Your Friends | |
| 2005 | Shihad | Love Is the New Hate | |
| 2005 | Bloodsimple | A Cruel World | |
| 2005 | Still Remains | Of Love and Lunacy | |
| 2005 | Haste the Day | When Everything Falls | |
| 2005 | Project 86 | ...And the Rest Will Follow | |
| 2005 | Hedley | Hedley | Co-produced with Brian Howes |
| 2006 | GrimSkunk | Fires Under the Road | |
| 2006 | It Dies Today | Sirens | |
| 2006 | Ten Second Epic | Count Yourself In | |
| 2007 | Haste the Day | Pressure the Hinges | |
| 2007 | Life in Your Way | Waking Giants | |
| 2007 | Biffy Clyro | Puzzle | |
| 2007 | Autovein | Bullets and Bruises | |
| 2008 | Trapt | Only Through the Pain | |
| 2008 | Blessed by a Broken Heart | Pedal to the Metal | |
| 2009 | Ten Second Epic | Hometown | |
| 2009 | Biffy Clyro | Only Revolutions | |
| 2009 | Dead and Divine | The Machines We Are | |
| 2009 | Gallows | Grey Britain | |
| 2011 | Japanese Voyeurs | Yolk | |
| 2011 | You Me at Six | Sinners Never Sleep | |
| 2012 | All the Young | Welcome Home | |
| 2012 | The Washboard Union | The Washboard Union | |
| 2013 | Head of the Herd | By This Time Tomorrow | |
| 2013 | Biffy Clyro | Opposites | |
| 2015 | The ReAktion | Selknam | |
| 2016 | The Empty Page | Unfolding | |
| 2017 | Big Wreck | Grace Street | |
| 2018 | GrimSkunk | Unreason in the Age of Madness | |
| 2019 | Danko Jones | A Rock Supreme | |
| 2019 | Kensington | Time | |
| 2019 | Hanggai | Big Brass Band | |
| 2022 | Devin Townsend | Lightwork | Co-produced with Devin Townsend |

== Awards and nominations ==
| Year | Award | Category | Nominated work | Result | Ref |
|---|---|---|---|---|---|
| 1994 | Grammy Award | Best Engineered Album, Non-Classical* | Rage Against the Machine by Rage Against the Machine | Nominated | |
| 1997 | Juno Award | Producer of the Year | "Bar-X-the Rocking M" from Stag by Melvins and "Mailman" from Shot by the Jesus Lizard | Won | |
| 2003 | Juno Award | Jack Richardson Producer of the Year | "Family Stem" and "The Red" from Wonder What's Next by Chevelle | Nominated | |
| 2006 | Juno Award | Jack Richardson Producer of the Year | "Gunnin'", "Villain" by Hedley from Hedley | Nominated | |
| 2010 | Mercury Prize | Album of the Year | Only Revolutions by Biffy Clyro | Nominated | |

*Richardson was nominated for the Grammy Award along with Andy Wallace and Stan Katayama.
