= Hedley (band) =

Canadian pop rock band

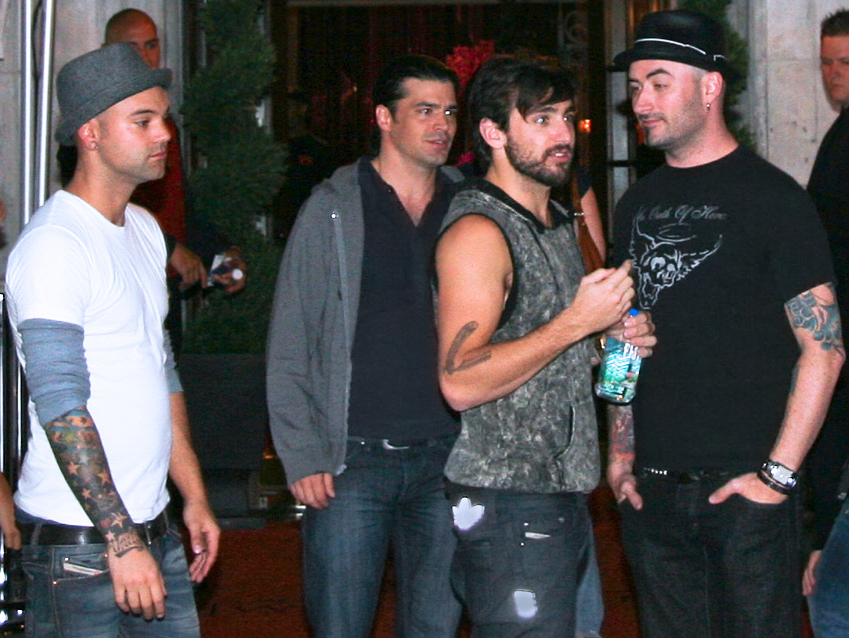
- Hedley at the 2009 Toronto International Film Festival

Background information
- Origin: Abbotsford, British Columbia, Canada
- Genres: Pop rock; pop-punk
- Years active: 2003–2018
- Labels: Universal Canada; Capitol; Island
- Past members: Jacob Hoggard; Tommy Mac; Dave Rosin; Jay Benison; Chris Crippin; Ryan Federau; Kevin Giesbrecht; Kevin Heeres; Brandon McKay

Hedley was a Canadian pop rock band formed in Abbotsford, British Columbia in 2003. They were named after the unincorporated community of Hedley, British Columbia, a name chosen after members heard that it was for sale for $346,000. After lead singer Jacob Hoggard placed third on the second season of Canadian Idol in 2004, the group signed with Universal Music Canada and released their self-titled debut studio album the following year. Hedley had commercial success with their subsequent studio albums, including Famous Last Words (2007), The Show Must Go (2009), Storms (2011), Wild Life (2013), Hello (2015), and Cageless (2017).

Following the release of Cageless and its accompanying tour, members of Hedley faced accusations of sexual misconduct with young women over the course of their career. After Hoggard faced additional accusations of sexual assault by two women, the group confirmed they would break up.

== History ==
=== 2003–2006: Early years and debut album ===
Hedley formed in 2003 in Abbotsford, British Columbia and originally consisted of Jacob Hoggard, Kevin Giesbrecht, Kevin Heeres, Ryan Federau, and Brandon McKay. Hoggard participated in Canadian Idol, where he made it to the top three. Shortly after, the members decided to go their separate ways, but the band re-formed not long after, with Hoggard as the only original member. He recruited guitarist Dave Rosin, bassist Tommy Mac, and drummer Chris Crippin, all of whom were previously in the Vancouver band Everything After. Hedley picked up attention at the Canadian Music Week 2005 media showcase and, soon after, signed with Universal Music Canada. "Street Fight" was the first song they wrote together, which was part of their five-track demo they sent to the label.

Their debut single "On My Own" was released on July 18, 2005, as the lead single from their debut self-titled studio album. The song reached number one on the Canadian Singles Chart. "Villain" was released as the second single from the album on July 26, 2005, and peaked at number 18 on the Canada Rock chart. "Trip" was released as the third single from the album on October 4, 2005. It peaked at number 11 on the Canadian Singles Chart. Brian Howes produced the track and won the group a Juno Award for Producer of the Year in 2007. "321" was released as the fourth single on March 14, 2006, and reached number 21 on the Canada CHR/Top 30 chart. "Gunnin'" was released on September 19, 2006, as the album's fifth single. Garth Richardson produced "Gunnin'" as well as "Villain" and earned both songs a Juno nomination for Producer of the Year in 2006. "Street Fight" was released in December 2006, as the sixth and final single from the album.

On September 6, 2005, the group released their debut studio album, Hedley, produced by Howes and Richardson. They recorded the album in Armoury Studios, Greenhouse Studios, Hipposonic Studios and Mushroom Studios in Vancouver, British Columbia and in The Farm Studios in Gibson's Landing, British Columbia. It peaked at number three on the Canadian Albums Chart and was certified double platinum in Canada. At the 2006 Juno Awards, the group was nominated for Breakthrough Group of the Year and their self-titled album was nominated for Rock Album of the Year.

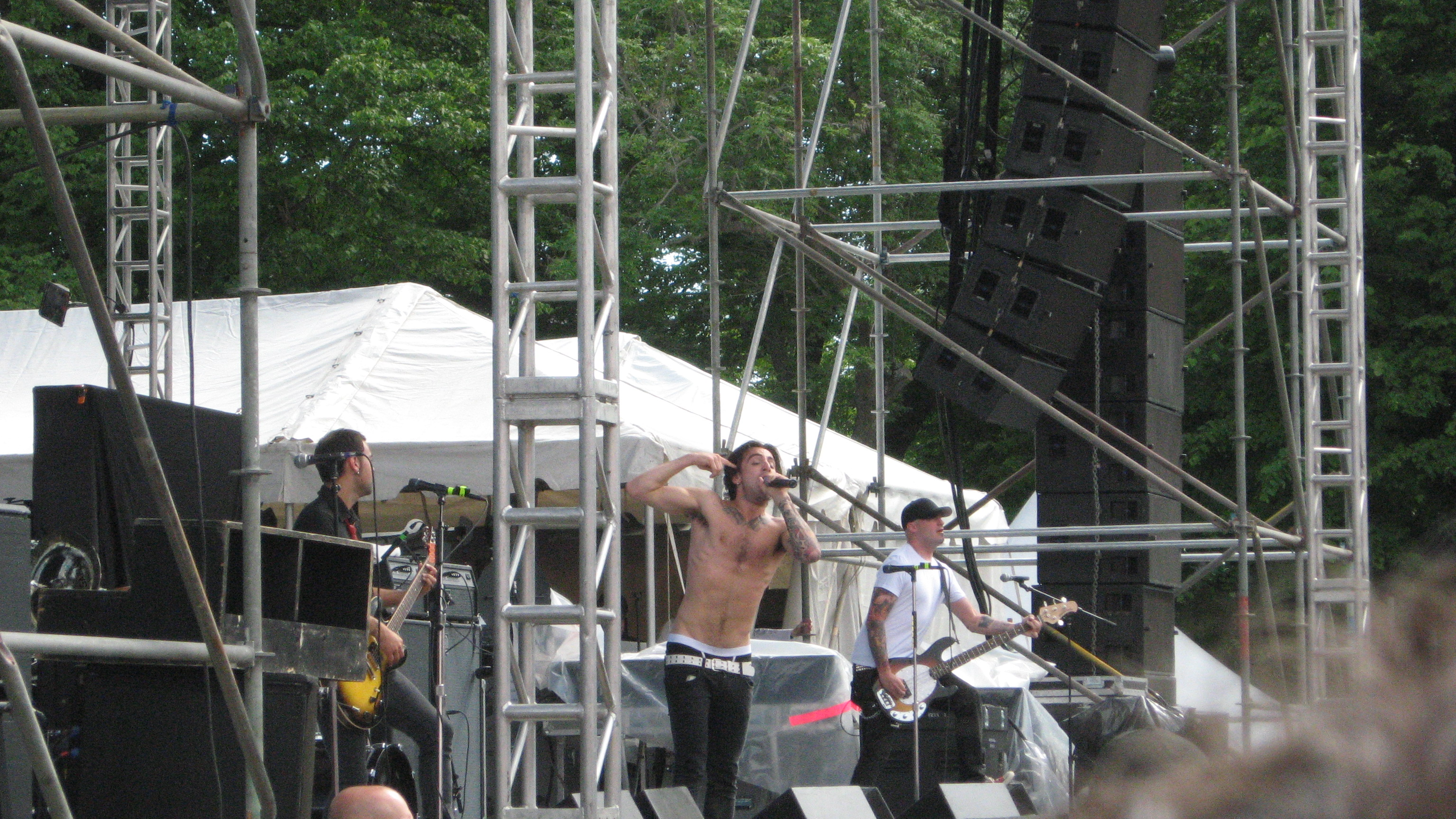
Hedley performing in 2007

In 2005, the band went on their first tour across Canada with The Weekend and Faber Drive. Then went on a 19-city Canadian tour with Simple Plan and in early 2006, headlined The Get Some Tour cross Canada club tour with MxPx and Faber. In the summer of 2006, they signed a record deal for the United States with Capitol Records. Upon signing, Hedley's self-titled album was released with a new cover in the US on September 26, 2006, a year after its initial release in Canada. During June 2006, the band went on tour in the US, opening for fellow Capitol Records artist Yellowcard, with Matchbox Romance. Subsequently, Hedley was dropped by Capitol Records a year later. Hedley was nominated for Album of the Year and the band was nominated for Group of the Year at the 2007 Juno Awards. The group released a DVD in 2006 called Try This at Home. It was nominated for a Juno Award for Music DVD of the Year in 2007.

=== 2007–2010: Famous Last Words and The Show Must Go ===
The group began working on their second studio album in May 2007, with producers Dave Genn and Greig Nori. The group recorded the album in Hipposonic Studios in Vancouver, British Columbia and in Rock Beach Recording in White Rock, British Columbia. Hoggard described the process as "lengthy" and said this time around, they wanted to showcase a lot of maturity on the record and as a result, "have learned the value of patience." They released their second studio album, Famous Last Words, on October 30, 2007, and it went platinum in Canada ten days later. The album peaked at number three on the Canadian Albums Chart, as well as reaching number one on the Canadian Alternative Albums chart. The first single from the album, "She's So Sorry", was released to radio on August 21, 2007, and had its music video premiere on MuchMusic on September 20, 2007. "For the Nights I Can't Remember" was released in November 2007, as the second single. The song peaked at number six on the Canadian Hot 100. The song topped the Canada Hot AC charts for eight weeks. The song won three MuchMusic Video Awards in 2008. In late 2007, the band opened for Bon Jovi on their Lost Highway Tour at their Canadian stops for 14 shows, forcing them to postpone their own tour until early 2008, opened by State of Shock. "Never Too Late" was released in April 2008, as the third single. The song reached number four on the Canadian Hot 100. "Old School" was released as the album's fourth single in August 2008, and reached number ten on the Canadian Hot 100. "Dying to Live Again" was released in November 2008, as the fifth single, peaking at number 59 on the Canadian Hot 100.

In the United States, the group released Famous Last Words as Never Too Late on May 12, 2009, by Fontana Distribution, at the time owned by Hedley's Canadian record label's parent company Universal Music. The album includes eight tracks from the Canadian release and five tracks from their first album.

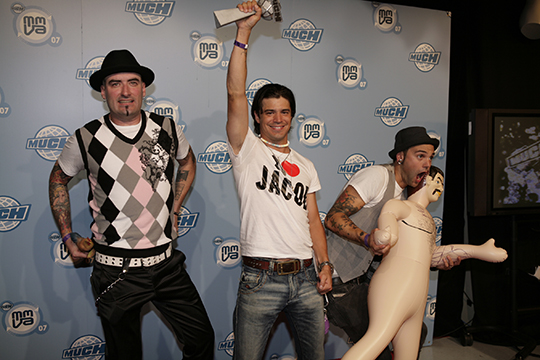
Hedley at the 2007 MMVA Awards

Working with producers David Bendeth, John Feldmann, Dave Genn and Brian Howes, Hoggard began writing songs for their third album as the band was wrapping up their Famous Last Words tour. Over the course of three months, 45 songs were written, inspired from "the collapse of several relationships — both romantic and platonic," according to Hoggard. On August 17, 2009, the group released "Cha-Ching" as the first single from their third album. It peaked at number six on the Canadian Hot 100. The second single, "Don't Talk to Strangers" was released on October 27, 2009. It peaked at number 11 on the Canadian Hot 100. On November 17, 2009, Hedley released their third studio album, The Show Must Go. The album peaked at number six on the Canadian Albums Chart and was certified double platinum in Canada. The album earned a Juno award nomination for Pop Album of the Year in 2010. The band was also nominated for Group of the Year. The third single, "Perfect", released on February 8, 2010, peaked at number seven on the Canadian Hot 100. The song reached number 25 on the US Adult Top 40 chart, marking the group's first charting song in the US. The song was nominated for Single of the Year and won Video of the Year at the 2011 Juno Awards. The fourth single off the album, "Hands Up", reached number 27 on the Canadian Hot 100. "Sweater Song" was released as the fifth single and peaked at number 63 on the Canadian Hot 100. The band went on The Show Must Go... on the Road Tour across 38 cities in Canada with supporting acts Fefe Dobson, Stereos, Faber Drive and Boys Like Girls. A live album and documentary, Go with the Show, was recorded during this tour and was released on November 9, 2010. The Show Must Go was nominated for Album of the Year at the 2011 Juno Awards.

In 2010, the band signed an American record deal with Island Records. The album was originally to be released in the US on October 12, but instead was released on December 7, 2010, containing the bonus tracks "I Do (Wanna Love You)" (a re-arrangement of the song "For the Nights I Can't Remember" and "Color Outside The Lines". The band also toured the US to promote the album. The band performed "Cha-Ching" in a segment with other artists highlighting Canadian music at the closing ceremony of the Vancouver 2010 Winter Olympic Games.

=== 2011–2014: Storms and Wild Life ===
On May 5, 2011, Hedley confirmed they were back in the studio recording a new album. Around the time of recording, bassist Tommy Mac was diagnosed with an undisclosed form of cancer. Mac recorded his tracks in between treatments and was later declared cancer-free. According to the group, Mac's perseverance inspired the band to "create the kind of uplifting songs that might spur others to carry on through their own hard times."

The first official single from the album "Invincible", was released on August 23, 2011. The track sold 14,000 copies in its first week and peaked at number nine on the Canadian Hot 100. The album's second single "One Life" was released on October 24, 2011. The band's fourth studio album, Storms, was released on November 8, 2011. The album debuted at number two on the Canadian Albums Chart and sold 23,000 copies in its first week. The album was certified platinum in Canada. Hedley won the Juno Award for Best Pop Album in 2012. They also earned a Juno Award nomination for Group of the Year. The group released a new single called "Kiss You Inside Out" on May 17, 2012, which serves as third single from the album. It was included in the re-release of the album on May 22, 2012. The song peaked at number two on the Canadian Hot 100 and was certified triple platinum in Canada. The song also reached number 24 on the US Adult Top 40 chart. A French version of "Kiss You Inside Out" featuring additional vocals by Andrée-Anne Leclerc was also made available on iTunes. The song earned a Juno Award nomination for Single of the Year in 2013. The album was also nominated for Album of the Year. To promote Storms, the band went on the 31-city Shipwrecked tour during early 2012.

On August 19, 2013, "Anything", was released as the first single from the upcoming fifth studio album. The song peaked at number five on the Canadian Hot 100 and was certified four-time platinum in Canada. The song also reached number 18 on the New Zealand Top 40, marking the group's first entry on the chart. The song won three MuchMusic Video Awards. A music video for the song was released on September 10, 2013, and was nominated for Video of the Year at the 2014 Juno Awards. The album's second single "Crazy For You", was released on October 22, 2013. The song reached number seven on the Canadian Hot 100 and was nominated for a Juno Award for Single of the Year in 2015. Wild Life was released on November 11, 2013. The album peaked at number four on the Canadian Albums Chart and has sold 64,000 copies. The album was certified platinum in Canada. "Heaven in Our Headlights" was released on June 17, 2014, as the third single from the album and peaked at number 14 on the Canadian Hot 100. The album's fourth single, "Pocket Full of Dreams" was released on November 18, 2014, and reached the Canadian Hot 100 chart at number 33. Wild Life was nominated for Album of the Year at the 2015 Juno Awards.

Hedley re-signed with Capitol Records in late 2013. The album was released via Capitol Records in the US on May 19, 2014. Hedley headlined the 101st Grey Cup Halftime show at Mosaic Stadium at Taylor Field in Regina, Saskatchewan on November 24, 2013, performing a 13-minute compilation of "Hands Up", "Anything", "Invincible" and "Cha-Ching". Hedley went on a Canadian national headlining tour, Wild Live Tour, to promote the album from February to April 2014.

=== 2015–2018: Hello, Cageless and indefinite hiatus ===
On September 8, Hedley released "Lost in Translation" as the lead single off their sixth studio album. "Hello" was released as the album's second single on October 9, 2015. The song reached number 20 on the Canadian Hot 100. Hello was released via Universal Music Canada on November 6, 2015. The album topped the Canadian Albums Chart and sold 14,500 copies first week. Hedley was nominated for Group of the Year and Hello was nominated for Pop Album of the Year at the 2016 Juno Awards. The album's third single, "Lose Control" was released on March 4, 2016. The song peaked at number 37 on the Canadian Hot 100 and was certified platinum in Canada. The album's fourth single, "Can't Slow Down" was released on August 25, 2016, and reached number 43 on the Canadian Hot 100. The group embarked on the Hello World Tour with supporting acts from Carly Rae Jepsen and Francesco Yates. On July 3, 2016, they were the headliners of the post-Queen's Plate concert held at Woodbine Racetrack (in Toronto) which also featured The Strumbellas & The Mathew Good Band. The album was certified platinum in Canada.

On March 31, 2017, Hedley announced on their Facebook page that their drummer, Chris Crippin had left the band after 11 years. Crippin later revealed that he had been fired by the group. He also spoke about his time with the band, saying that Hoggard was "extremely rude" and was silenced when he tried to confront Hoggard about his behaviour. On June 13, 2017, the group released the lead single, "Love Again" from their upcoming seventh studio. The song peaked at number 50 on the Canadian Hot 100. "Better Days" was released as the album's second single on August 18, 2017. The song reached number 42 on the Canadian Hot 100. Their seventh studio album Cageless, was released September 29, 2017. The album debuted at number two on the Canadian Albums Chart and in its first week, sold 9,000 copies.

On February 13, 2018, then current Hedley members were anonymously accused of sexual misconduct with young fans, primarily female, as young as 14 years of age. As a result, the Juno Awards and the band mutually agreed to cancel their scheduled performance. The band posted a Facebook message, saying that the accusations were unsubstantiated and that while the band in the past "engaged in a lifestyle that incorporated certain rock and roll clichés [...] there was always a line that we would never cross". On February 28, 2018, Hedley announced that they would take an indefinite hiatus following their tour, while Hoggard announced he would be taking an indefinite step back from his career. On February 16, 2018, it was announced that Hedley was dropped by their management team effective immediately. Several radio stations and media organizations (including Corus Radio and CBC Music) removed and suspended all of their music due to these allegations. On February 25, 2018, an Ottawa woman accused lead singer Jacob Hoggard of sexual assault after the pair met on Tinder and went to a hotel to have sex in November 2016. On July 23, 2018, Hoggard was charged with one count of Sexual Interference and two counts of Sexual Assault Causing Bodily Harm. On October 20, 2022, he was sentenced to 5 years in prison after being found guilty of sexually assaulting the Ottawa woman. On August 16, 2024, Hoggard began serving his five-year prison sentence following an appeal dismissed by the court.

== Band members ==
=== Final lineup ===
- Jacob Hoggard – lead vocals, guitar, piano (2003–2018)
- Dave Rosin – guitar, backing vocals (2005–2018)
- Tommy Mac – bass, backing vocals (2005–2018)
- Jay Benison – drums (2017–2018)

=== Former ===
- Ryan Federau – guitar (2003–2005)
- Kevin Giesbrecht – guitar (2003–2005)
- Kevin Heeres – bass (2003–2005)
- Brandon McKay – drums (2003–2005)
- Chris Crippin – drums (2005–2017)

== Discography ==
- Hedley (2005)
- Famous Last Words (2007)
- The Show Must Go (2009)
- Storms (2011)
- Wild Life (2013)
- Hello (2015)
- Cageless (2017)

== Tours ==
=== Headlining ===
- Hedley (2005)
- On the Road (2006)
- Famous Last Words Tour (2008)
- The Show Must Go (2009–2010)
- Shipwrecked Tour (2012)
- Wild Live (2014–2015)
- Hello World Tour (2016)
- Cageless Tour (2017–2018)

=== Opening act ===
- Still Not Getting Any (2005)
- Lost Highway Tour (2007)
- All the Right Reasons Tour (2007)

== Awards and nominations ==
Hedley awards and nominations
Awards and nominations
| Award | Wins | Nominations |
| Canadian Radio Music Awards | 5 | 7 |
| Juno Awards | 4 | 32 |
| MuchMusic Video Awards | 12 | 32 |
| SOCAN Awards | 6 | 6 |

Totals (Note: Certain award groups do not simply award one winner. They acknowledge several different recipients, have runners-up, and have third place. Since this is a specific recognition and is different from losing an award, runner-up mentions are considered wins in this award tally. For simplification and to avoid errors, each award in this list has been presumed to have had a prior nomination.)
- Wins: 27
- Nominations: 77

=== Canadian Radio Music Awards ===
| Year | Category | Work | Result | Ref. |
|---|---|---|---|---|
| 2009 | Fans' Choice | "For the Nights I Can't Remember" | Won | |
| 2009 | Song of the Year | "For the Nights I Can't Remember" | Won | |
| 2009 | Chart Topper Award | "For the Nights I Can't Remember" | Won | |
| 2010 | Fans' Choice | Hedley | Won | |
| 2015 | Chart Topper Award | Hedley | Won | |
| 2015 | Fans' Choice | Hedley | Nominated | |
| 2015 | Song of the Year | "Crazy for You" | Nominated | |

=== Juno Awards ===
| Year | Category | Work | Result | Ref. |
|---|---|---|---|---|
| 2006 | Breakthrough Group of the Year | Hedley | Nominated | |
| 2006 | Rock Album of the Year | Hedley | Nominated | |
| 2007 | Album of the Year | Hedley | Nominated | |
| 2007 | Group of the Year | Hedley | Nominated | |
| 2007 | Music DVD of the Year | Try This at Home | Nominated | |
| 2010 | Group of the Year | Hedley | Nominated | |
| 2010 | Pop Album of the Year | The Show Must Go | Nominated | |
| 2011 | Album of the Year | The Show Must Go | Nominated | |
| 2011 | Juno Fan Choice Award | Hedley | Nominated | |
| 2011 | Single of the Year | "Perfect" | Nominated | |
| 2011 | Video of the Year | "Perfect" | Won | |
| 2012 | Juno Fan Choice Award | Hedley | Nominated | |
| 2012 | Group of the Year | Hedley | Nominated | |
| 2012 | Pop Album of the Year | Storms | Won | |
| 2013 | Album of the Year | Storms | Nominated | |
| 2013 | Single of the Year | "Kiss You Inside Out" | Nominated | |
| 2013 | Juno Fan Choice Award | Hedley | Nominated | |
| 2014 | Group of the Year | Hedley | Nominated | |
| 2014 | Juno Fan Choice Award | Hedley | Nominated | |
| 2014 | Video of the Year | "Anything" | Nominated | |
| 2014 | Pop Album of the Year | Wild Life | Nominated | |
| 2015 | Album of the Year | Wild Life | Nominated | |
| 2015 | Single of the Year | "Crazy for You" | Nominated | |
| 2015 | Juno Fan Choice Award | Hedley | Nominated | |
| 2016 | Group of the Year | Hedley | Nominated | |
| 2016 | Pop Album of the Year | Hello | Nominated | |
| 2017 | Juno Fan Choice Award | Hedley | Nominated | |

- Garth Richardson was nominated for Producer of the Year at the Juno Awards of 2006 for producing "Gunnin" and "Villain" by Hedley.
- Brian Howes won Producer of the Year at the Juno Awards of 2007 for producing "Trip" by Hedley.
- Brian Howes was nominated for Producer of the Year at the Juno Awards of 2011 for producing "Cha-Ching" and "Perfect" by Hedley.
- Brian Howes won Producer of the Year at the Juno Awards of 2012 for producing "Heaven's Gonna Wait" by Hedley.
- Brian Howes and Jacob Hoggard were nominated for Producer of the Year at the Juno Awards of 2014 for producing "Anything" and "Crazy for You" by Hedley.

=== iHeartRadio Much Music Video Awards ===
| Year | Category | Work | Result | Ref. |
|---|---|---|---|---|
| 2006 | Best Rock Video | "On My Own" | Nominated | |
| 2007 | Best Pop Video | "Gunnin'" | Won | |
| 2007 | People's Choice: Favourite Canadian Group | "Gunnin'" | Nominated | |
| 2007 | Best Post-Production | "Gunnin'" | Won | |
| 2008 | Best Video | "For the Nights I Can't Remember" | Won | |
| 2008 | Best Director | "For the Nights I Can't Remember" | Won | |
| 2008 | UR FAVE: Group | "For the Nights I Can't Remember" | Nominated | |
| 2008 | Best Cinematography | "For the Nights I Can't Remember" | Won | |
| 2008 | Best Cinematography | "She's So Sorry" | Nominated | |
| 2008 | MuchLOUD Best Rock Video | "She's So Sorry" | Won | |
| 2010 | Video of the Year | "Perfect" | Won | |
| 2010 | Post-Production of the Year | "Perfect" | Won | |
| 2010 | Director of the Year | "Perfect" | Nominated | |
| 2010 | UR FAVE: Video | "Perfect" | Nominated | |
| 2010 | Pop Video of the Year | "Cha-Ching" | Won | |
| 2012 | UR FAVE: Artist | Hedley | Nominated | |
| 2012 | Cinematographer of the Year | "Invincible" | Nominated | |
| 2012 | UR FAVE: Video | "Invincible" | Nominated | |
| 2012 | MuchMusic.com Most Streamed Video of the Year | "One Life" | Nominated | |
| 2013 | Pop Video of the Year | "Kiss You Inside Out" | Nominated | |
| 2013 | UR Fave Video of the Year | "Kiss You Inside Out" | Nominated | |
| 2014 | UR Fave Artist/Group | Hedley | Nominated | |
| 2014 | Video of the Year | "Anything" | Won | |
| 2014 | Director of the Year | "Anything" | Nominated | |
| 2014 | Pop Video of the Year | "Anything" | Won | |
| 2014 | UR Fave Video of the Year | "Anything" | Won | |
| 2014 | Post-Production of the Year | "Crazy For You" | Nominated | |
| 2015 | Pop Video of the Year | "Heaven in Our Headlights" | Nominated | |
| 2015 | Fan Fave Video | "Heaven in Our Headlights" | Nominated | |
| 2016 | Best Pop Video | "Lose Control" | Nominated | |
| 2016 | Fan Fave Video | "Lose Control" | Nominated | |
| 2017 | Best Pop Video | "Can't Slow Down" | Nominated | |

=== SOCAN Awards ===
| Year | Category | Work | Result | Ref. |
|---|---|---|---|---|
| 2007 | No. 1 Song Award | "321" | Won | |
| 2009 | Pop/Rock Music Award | "For the Nights I Can't Remember" | Won | |
| 2010 | No. 1 Song Award | "Don't Talk to Strangers" | Won | |
| 2011 | Pop/Rock Music Award | "Perfect" | Won | |
| 2012 | Pop/Rock Music Award | "Invincible" | Won | |
| 2014 | Pop/Rock Music Award | "One Life" | Won | |
| 2015 | Pop/Rock Music Award | "Heaven in Our Headlights" | Won | |
| 2015 | Pop/Rock Music Award | "Crazy for You" | Won | |
| 2017 | National Achievement Award | Hedley | Won | |

== See also ==
- List of bands from Canada
