= 2006 MuchMusic Video Awards =

Edition of Canadian annual award show

- 2006 MuchMusic Video Awards logo
- Starring: Leah Miller, Matte Babel, Devon Soltendieck, Sarah Taylor
- Country of origin: Canada

Production
- Running time: 2 hours
- Production company: MuchMusic

Original release
- Network: MuchMusic
- Release: June 18, 2006

The 2006 MuchMusic Video Awards were held on June 18, 2006, and featured performances by Fall Out Boy, Hedley, Rihanna, City and Colour, Simple Plan and others. The most nominated artists were Billy Talent, Kardinal Offishall f. Ray Robinson and Massari with 5 nominations each.

== Awards ==
=== Best Video ===
- Kardinal Offishall f. Ray Robinson — "Everyday (Rudebwoy)"
- Billy Talent — "Devil in a Midnight Mass"
- Buck 65 — "Devil's Eyes"
- Nickelback — "Photograph"
- The Trews — "So She's Leaving"

=== Best Director ===
- Kardinal Offishall f. Ray Robinson — "Everyday (Rudebwoy)" (directed by: RT!)
- Billy Talent — "Devil in a Midnight Mass" (directed by: Sean Michael Turrell)
- Stars — "Your Ex-Lover Is Dead" (directed by: Experimental Parachute Moment)
- Massari — "Be Easy" (directed by: RT!)
- The Trews - "So She's Leaving" (directed by: Stephen Scott)

=== Best Post-Production ===
- The Trews — "So She's Leaving"
- Billy Talent — "Devil in a Midnight Mass"
- The Arcade Fire — "Neighbourhood#3 (Power Out)"
- Metric — "Poster of a Girl"
- Mobile — "Out of My Head"

=== Best Cinematography ===
- Buck 65 — "Devil's Eyes"
- Billy Talent — "Devil in a Midnight Mass"
- Kardinal Offishall f. Ray Robinson — "Everyday (Rudebwoy)" (Claudio Miranda)
- Massari — "Be Easy"
- Metric — "Poster of a Girl"

=== Best Pop Video ===
- Massari — "Be Easy"
- Bedouin Soundclash — "Shelter"
- City and Colour — "Save Your Scissors"
- Hot Hot Heat — "Middle of Nowhere"
- Kardinal Offishall f. Ray Robinson — "Everyday (Rudebwoy)"

=== MuchLOUD Best Rock Video ===
- Nickelback — "Photograph"
- Billy Talent — "Devil in a Midnight Mass"
- Hedley — "On My Own"
- Simple Plan — "Crazy"
- The Trews — "So She's Leaving"

=== MuchVibe Best Rap Video ===
- Classified — "No Mistakes"
- Alias Donmillion — "Dirty Dot"
- JDiggz — "Puush It Up"
- Sweatshop Union — "Try"
- Jelleestone f. Nelly Furtado — "Friendamine"

=== Best Independent Video ===
- Metric — "Poster of a Girl"
- Broken Social Scene — "7/4 (Shoreline)"
- City and Colour — "Save Your Scissors"
- Massari — "Be Easy"
- Neverending White Lights f. Dallas Green — "The Grace"

=== MuchMoreMusic Award ===
- Michael Bublé — "Save the Last Dance for Me"
- Bedouin Soundclash — "Shelter"
- Daniel Powter — "Bad Day"
- Feist — "Mushaboom"
- Sam Roberts — "The Gate"

=== Best French Video ===
- Stéphanie Lapointe — "La Mer"
- André — "Yolande Wong"
- Anik Jean — "Tendre sorcière"
- Les Cowboys Fringants — "Plus rien"
- Marie-Mai — "Rien"

=== Best International Video - Artist ===
- Rihanna — "SOS"
- James Blunt — "You're Beautiful"
- Kanye West f. Lupe Fiasco — "Touch the Sky"
- Kanye West f. Jamie Foxx — "Gold Digger"
- Kelly Clarkson — "Behind These Hazel Eyes"
- Madonna — "Hung Up"
- Mariah Carey — "Don't Forget About Us"
- Ne-Yo — "So Sick"
- Pink — "Stupid Girls"
- Sean Paul — "Temperature"

=== Best International Video - Group ===
- Green Day — "Wake Me Up When September Ends"
- Angels & Airwaves — "The Adventure"
- Fall Out Boy — "Dance, Dance"
- Franz Ferdinand — "Do You Want To"
- Green Day — "Jesus of Suburbia"
- Panic! at the Disco — "I Write Sins Not Tragedies"
- Pussycat Dolls f. Busta Rhymes — "Don't Cha"
- Red Hot Chili Peppers — "Dani California"
- The All-American Rejects — "Dirty Little Secret"
- The Black Eyed Peas — "My Humps"

=== People's Choice: Favourite International Group ===
- Fall Out Boy — "Dance, Dance"
- Coldplay — "Speed of Sound"
- Green Day — "Wake Me Up When September Ends"
- Pussycat Dolls f. Busta Rhymes — "Don't Cha"
- Black Eyed Peas — "My Humps"

=== People's Choice: Favourite International Artist ===
- Kelly Clarkson — "Because of You"
- James Blunt — "You're Beautiful"
- Kanye West — "Gold Digger"
- Mariah Carey — "Shake It Off"
- Rihanna — "S.O.S. (Rescue Me)"

=== People's Choice: Favourite Canadian Group ===
- Simple Plan — "Crazy"
- Hedley — "321"
- Nickelback — "Photograph"
- Our Lady Peace — "Angels/Losing/Sleep"
- Theory of a Dead Man — "Santa Monica"

=== People's Choice: Favourite Canadian Artist ===
- City and Colour — "Save Your Scissors"
- Bif Naked — "Let Down"
- Kardinal Offishall f. Ray Robinson — "Everyday (Rudebwoy)"
- Massari — "Real Love"
- Sam Roberts — "The Gate"

== Performers ==
- Rihanna
- Hedley
- City and Colour
- Metric
- Simple Plan
- Nelly Furtado f. Timbaland
- Yellowcard
- Fall Out Boy
- Nick Lachey
