= Tommy Mac (musician) =

Canadian musician

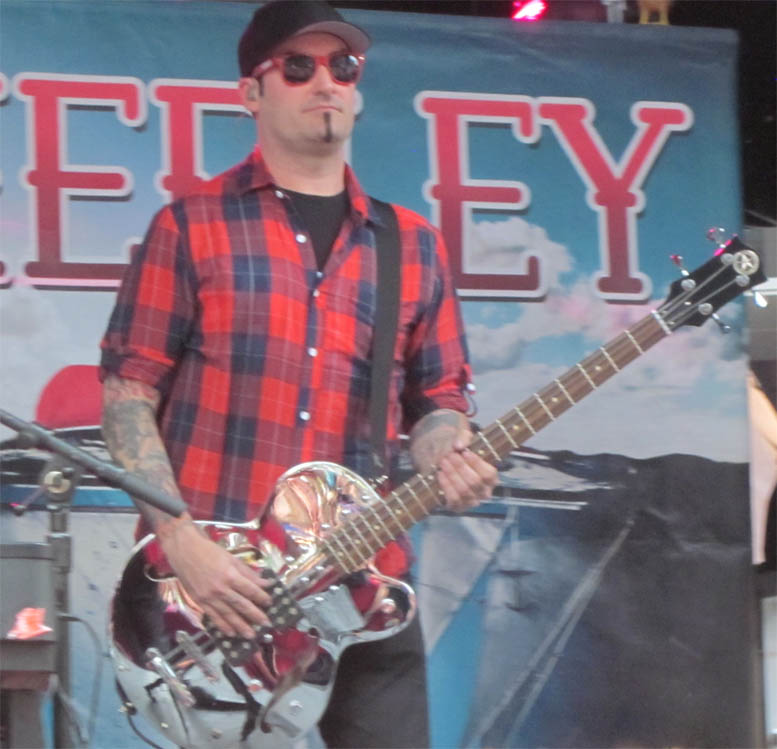
- Mac in 2012

Background information
- Also known as: Tom MacDonald
- Born: April 25, 1971 (age 54)
- Origin: Langley, British Columbia, Canada
- Genres: Alternative metal; nu metal; pop rock; pop-punk; punk rock; rock
- Occupation: Musician
- Instruments: Bass, background vocals, guitar
- Years active: 1995–present
- Labels: Fontana North; Universal Music Canada
- Member of: Day of the Dog
- Formerly of: Jar.; BigFATScratch; Loco; Everything After; Hedley

Tommy Mac (born April 25, 1971) is a Canadian bassist and singer. He is the bassist of the rock band Hedley. In 2021, Mac began playing in a band called Day of the Dog.

== Career ==
Before joining Hedley, Mac revealed in an interview that he was in a band called "Jar.". With the band, he was credited on two studio albums, Knott Skull and Headtrip to Nowhere. Mac was also in groups such as BigFATScratch and Loco. He also played in a band called Everything After with Dave Rosin and Chris Crippin who would later join Hedley.

Tommy Mac joined Hedley in 2005. Their debut single, "On My Own", reached number one on the Canadian Singles Chart. They have released seven studio albums, where all of them with the exception of Cageless, have been certified platinum in Canada. Their single "Kiss You Inside Out" peaked at number two on the Canadian Hot 100. "Anything" became the band's best selling single, which was certified 4× platinum in Canada. In 2018, the band took an indefinite hiatus after sexual assault allegations have been brought up against Jacob Hoggard, the frontman of the band.

Mac also became the manager of the Canadian pop rock band, The Latency. He discovered the group when he came to their high school as a guest speaker. He helped produced their debut studio album and co-wrote their debut single, "Tonight, I Love You". As of 2021, Mac plays in a band called Day of the Dog.

== Personal life ==
Outside of the band, Mac had opened up his own studio called The Beat Lab Studio. It was revealed that in 2011, Tommy Mac was diagnosed with an undisclosed form of cancer, in the second stage of the disease. He underwent treatment and is in good health today. Mac owned a rare five-string Riversong bass guitar which he gave away to Riversong Guitars founder Mike Miltimore after his was stolen in 2020.

== Discography ==
with Jar. / Flybanger

- Knott Skull (1998)
- Outlived (2000) [EP]
- Headtrip to Nowhere (2001)

with BigFATScratch

- "Laff" (2002) [Single]

with Loco

- Dead World (2002)

with Hedley

- Hedley (2005)
- Famous Last Words (2007)
- The Show Must Go (2009)
- Storms (2011)
- Wild Life (2013)
- Hello (2015)
- Cageless (2017)
