= Jack Richardson Producer of the Year Award =

Annual Canadian music award category

The Juno Award for "Producer of the Year" has been awarded since 1975, as recognition each year for the best record producer in Canada. It was renamed the "Jack Richardson Producer of the Year" award in 2003, after Jack Richardson who was a noted Canadian record producer.

The award is presented based on the Canadian nationality of the producer, and can be presented for work with either Canadian or international recording artists.

== Winners ==
=== Producer of the Year (1970–1977) ===
- 1970 – The Poppy Family, "Which Way You Goin' Billy?" by The Poppy Family
- 1971 – Brian Ahern, "Snowbird" by Anne Murray
- 1972 – Mel Shaw, "Sweet City Woman" by The Stampeders
- 1973 – Gene Martynec, "Last Song" by Edward Bear
- 1974 – No Award was Presented
- 1975 – Randy Bachman
- 1976 – Peter Anastasoff, "The Homecoming" by Hagood Hardy
- 1977 – Mike Flicker, Dreamboat Annie by Heart

=== Producer of the Year – Single (1978) ===
- 1978 – Matthew McCauley & Fred Mollin, "Sometimes When We Touch" by Dan Hill

=== Producer of the Year – Album (1978) ===
- 1978 – Matthew McCauley & Fred Mollin, Longer Fuse by Dan Hill

=== Producer of the Year (1979–1998) ===
- 1979 – Gino Vannelli, Joe Vannelli & Ross Vannelli, Brother to Brother by Gino Vannelli
- 1980 – Bruce Fairbairn, Armageddon by Prism
- 1981 – Gene Martynec, "Tokyo" by Bruce Cockburn and "High School Confidential" by Rough Trade
- 1982 – Paul Dean & Bruce Fairbairn, "Working for the Weekend" and "When It's Over" by Loverboy
- 1983 – Bill Henderson & Brian MacLeod, "Whatcha Gonna Do" and "Secret Information" from Opus X by Chilliwack
- 1984 – Bryan Adams, Cuts Like a Knife by Bryan Adams
- 1985 – David Foster, Chicago 17 by Chicago
- 1986 – David Foster, St. Elmo's Fire Soundtrack by various artists
- 1987 – Daniel Lanois, So by Peter Gabriel
- 1989 – Daniel Lanois & Robbie Robertson, "Showdown at Big Sky" and "Somewhere Down the Crazy River" from Robbie Robertson by Robbie Robertson
- 1990 – Bruce Fairbairn, Pump by Aerosmith
- 1991 – David Tyson, "Baby, It's Tonight" from A View from 3rd Street by Jude Cole and "Don't Hold Back Your Love" from Change of Season by Hall & Oates
- 1992 – Bryan Adams (co-producer Robert John "Mutt" Lange), "(Everything I Do) I Do It for You" and "Can't Stop This Thing We Started" from Waking Up the Neighbours by Bryan Adams
- 1993 – k.d. lang & Ben Mink (Co-producer Greg Penny), "Constant Craving" and "The Mind of Love" from Ingénue by k.d. lang
- 1994 – Steven MacKinnon & Marc Jordan, "Waiting for a Miracle" from Reckless Valentine by Marc Jordan
- 1995 – Robbie Robertson, "Skin Walker" and "It Is a Good Day to Die" from Music for The Native Americans by Robbie Robertson
- 1996 – Michael Phillip Wojewoda, "End of the World" from Cock's Crow by The Waltons and "Beaton's Delight" from Hi™ How Are You Today? by Ashley MacIsaac
- 1997 – Garth Richardson, "Bar-X-the Rocking M" from Stag by Melvins and "Mailman" from Shot by The Jesus Lizard
- 1998 – Pierre Marchand, "Building a Mystery" from Surfacing by Sarah McLachlan

=== Best Producer (1999–2001) ===
- 1999 – Colin James (co-producer Joe Hardy), "Let's Shout" and "C'mon with the C'mon" from Colin James and the Little Big Band II by Colin James
- 2000 – Tal Bachman & Bob Rock, "She's So High" and "If You Sleep" from Tal Bachman by Tal Bachman
- 2001 – Gerald Eaton, Brian West & Nelly Furtado, "I'm like a Bird" and "Turn Off the Light" from Whoa, Nelly! by Nelly Furtado

=== Jack Richardson Best Producer (2002) ===
- 2002 – Daniel Lanois (co-producer Brian Eno), "Beautiful Day" and "Elevation" from All That You Can't Leave Behind by U2

=== Jack Richardson Producer of the Year (2003–present) ===
- 2003 – Alanis Morissette, "Hands Clean"; "So Unsexy"
- 2004 – Gavin Brown, "Try Honesty"; "I Hate Everything About You"
- 2005 – Bob Rock, "Welcome to My Life"; "Some Kind of Monster"
- 2006 – Neil Young, "The Painter"
- 2007 – Brian Howes, "Trip" and "Lips of an Angel" (Hedley)
- 2008 – Joni Mitchell, "Hana" and "Bad Dreams"
- 2009 – Daniel Lanois, "Here Is What Is" and "Not Fighting Anymore" (Daniel Lanois)
- 2010 – Bob Rock, "Haven't Met You Yet" and "Baby (You've Got What It Takes)" from Crazy Love by Michael Bublé
- 2011 – Daniel Lanois, "Hitchhiker" from Le Noise by Neil Young and "I Believe in You" from Black Dub by Black Dub
- 2012 – Brian Howes, "Heaven's Gonna Wait" from Storms by Hedley and "Trying Not to Love You" from Here and Now by Nickelback
- 2013 – James Shaw, "Youth Without Youth" and "Breathing Underwater" from Synthetica by Metric
- 2014 – Cirkut (co-producer Luke Gottwald), "Wrecking Ball" from Bangerz by Miley Cyrus and "Give It 2 U" from Blurred Lines by Robin Thicke
- 2015 – Adam Messinger, "Change Your Life" (co-producer Nasri Atweh) from The New Classic by Iggy Azalea; "Rude" from Don't Kill the Magic by Magic!
- 2016 – Bob Ezrin, "Honey Honey", "What Love Is All About" from What Love Is All About by Johnny Reid
- 2017 – A Tribe Called Red, "R.E.D." feat. Yasiin Bey, Narcy & Black Bear, "Sila" feat. Tanya Tagaq from We Are the Halluci Nation by A Tribe Called Red
- 2018 – Diana Krall, "L-O-V-E", "Night and Day"
- 2019 – Eric Ratz, "People's Champ", "Relentless" (Arkells, Rally Cry)
- 2020 – Ben Kaplan – "Brittle Bones Nicky" (Rare Americans), "It's Alright" (Mother Mother)
- 2021 – WondaGurl: "Aim for the Moon" (Pop Smoke feat. Quavo); "Gang Gang" (JackBoys and Sheck Wes)
- 2022 – WondaGurl – "Fair Trade" (Drake feat. Travis Scott), "Made a Way" (FaZe Kaysan feat. Lil Durk and Future)
- 2023 – Akeel Henry – "For Tonight" (Giveon), "Splash" (John Legend)
- 2024 – Shawn Everett – "Used to Be Young" (Miley Cyrus), "What Now" (Brittany Howard)
- 2025 – Jack Rochon – "II Hands II Heaven" (Beyoncé), "Protector" (Beyoncé), "Jolene" (Beyoncé), "My Way" (Charlotte Day Wilson), "Crash" (Kehlani), "Tears" (Kehlani)
- 2026 – Cirkut – "APT.", Rosé and Bruno Mars; "Abracadabra", Lady Gaga; "Disease", Lady Gaga; "A Little More", Ed Sheeran; "It Girl", Jade Thirlwall; "AEOMG", Coco Jones
