= Storms (Hedley album) =

Studio album by Hedley
- Released: 8 November 2011
- Recorded: 2011
- Genres: Pop rock; alternative rock
- Length: 43:24
- Label: Universal Music Canada
- Producers: Brian Howes; Jacob Hoggard

Hedley chronology
Go with the Show (2009)	Storms (2011)	Wild Life (2013)

Singles from Storms
- 1. "Invincible" Released: 22 August 2011; 2. "One Life" Released: 24 October 2011; 3. "Kiss You Inside Out" Released: 17 May 2012

Storms is the fourth full-length studio album by Canadian pop rock band Hedley. It was preceded by the release of two top-20 singles, lead single "Invincible" in August 2011 and "One Life" in October 2011. The album was released in Canada on 8 November 2011 through Universal Music Canada. A critical and commercial success, the album debuted at No. 2 on the Top Canadian Albums chart. In May 2012, Storms was re-issued with a modified track listing that includes a third single and sixteenth track "Kiss You Inside Out".

== Background ==
On May 5, 2011, Hedley confirmed that they were back in the studio recording a new album. Around the time of recording, bassist Tommy Mac was diagnosed with an undisclosed form of cancer. Mac managed to record his tracks for the album in between treatments and was later declared cancer-free. Mac further explained in an interview with MuchMusic that he "didn't let the guys know until the last minute." According to the group, Mac's perseverance inspired the band to "create the kind of uplifting songs that might spur others to carry on through their own hard times."

The sixth track "Beautiful" was first released on Hedley's live album Go With the Show in 2010. It was performed at the Metro Centre in Halifax. A Jumbotron video was also recorded and can be seen on the DVD, as a special feature. In support of Storms, the band went on the 31 city Shipwrecked tour during early 2012.

Pre-orders for the album were available via iTunes on 24 October 2011, where fans who pre-ordered the album would receive an instant download of the group's second single "One Life". Released on 8 November 2011, the group performed new songs off the album on MuchMusic on 11 November.

== Composition ==
The group worked with producer Brian Howes and the album sees the group experimenting with elements of pop and electronic music to create their most musically diverse soundscape yet, as well as the one with most overt pop overtones. Jacob Hoggard described the album as their "most serious, polished album yet." Similarly, guitarist Dave Rosin said the record was "important" to them, highlight the band's maturity and growth. The last track, "I Won't Let You Go (Darling)" was produced by Hoggard and Rosin and is their longest song ever recorded, at 8 minutes and 34 seconds. The song was originally supposed to be four minutes but the group improvised the last half and spent 30 takes to get the song right, according to the band.

== Singles ==
The album produced three top-20 singles. The lead single "Invincible", was released on 22 August 2011 and features guest vocals from rapper P. Reign. The song peaked at number nine on the Canadian Hot 100 and was certified double platinum in Canada. The album's second single "One Life", was released on 24 October 2011. The song reached number 16 on the Canadian Hot 100. The third single "Kiss You Inside Out" was released on 17 May 2012 and was featured in their re-issued release of Storms. The song was met with critical acclaim, peaking at number two on the Canadian Hot 100 and was certified triple platinum in Canada. The song also topped the Canada AC chart for two weeks. The song earned a Juno Award nomination for Single of the Year in 2013.

== Reception ==
Professional ratings
Review scores
Source	Rating
AllMusic	3/5 stars
MuchMusic	8/10 stars

=== Critical ===
Jon O'Brien of AllMusic described the album as "an enjoyably big, brash, and bombastic affair." He stated, "the follow-up to 2009's The Show Must Go always sounds more convincing when it embraces their boy band leanings, whether it's the heartfelt string-soaked balladry of 'Heaven's Gonna Wait' and 'Stormy'." However, he criticized the album's last track "I Won't Let You Go (Darling)", where he said the song was "unnecessarily" long. Allison of MuchMusic remarked, "Hedley have shown that adulthood is upon them with a maturity in their lyrics and risk taking in their musicianship that has yet to be heard in earlier records. Expanding their range by working with producer Babyface and trying their hand at a more pop and house sound, the band, who was once known for singing about drunken nights and hot girls, still have their party anthems present on Storms" and highlighted "Beautiful", "Bullet For Your Dreams" and "I Won't Let You Go (Darling)" as the standout tracks.

=== Commercial performance ===
The album debuted at number two on the Canadian Albums Chart, selling 23,000 copies. This was the biggest debut of the week, behind Michael Bublé's holiday album Christmas. On 23 November 2011, the album was certified Gold by Music Canada, and on 23 December of the same year, it was certified Platinum. Storms won the Juno Award for Best Pop Album at the 2012 ceremony.

== Track listing ==
Canadian standard edition
No.	Title	Writer(s)	Producer	Length
1.	"One Life"	Jacob Hoggard, Matt Squire, Lucas Banker	Brian Howes	3:33
2.	"Invincible"	Hoggard, Howes, Jason Van Poederooyen	Howes	3:43
3.	"Heaven's Gonna Wait"	Hoggard, Howes	Howes	4:07
4.	"We Are Unbreakable"	Hoggard, Howes, Gregg Wattenberg, Ryan Star, Derek Fuhrmann	Howes	3:32
5.	"Young"	Hoggard, Howes, Poederooyen	Howes	3:24
6.	"Beautiful"	Hoggard, Dave Rosin	Howes, Hoggard	3:23
7.	"Bullet for Your Dreams"	Hoggard, Howes, Poederooyen	Howes	3:03
8.	"Hot Mess"	Hoggard, Ryan Petersen, Nolan Sipe	Howes	3:06
9.	"Stormy"	Hoggard, Babyface	Howes	3:41
10.	"Last Call"	Hoggard, John Feldmann	Howes	3:30
11.	"I Won't Let You Go (Darling)"	Hoggard, Rosin	Howes, Hoggard	8:34
Total length:				43:24

Deluxe edition bonus tracks
No.	Title	Writer(s)	Length
12.	"Hiding Place"
13.	"Carry On"
14.	"Heaven's Gonna Wait" (Acoustic Mix)	Hoggard, Howes
15.	"All You Get Is Sound" (Pre-order only)

Itunes Deluxe Edition (Bonus track) 12. Invincible (Feat. P. Reign) (Rap version)

American standard edition / Canadian 2012 re-issue
No.	Title	Writer(s)	Producer	Length
1.	"One Life"	Hoggard, Squire, Banker	Howes	3:33
2.	"Kiss You Inside Out"	Brandyn Burnett, Lauren Christy, Adrian Newman	Newman	3:37
3.	"Invincible"	Hoggard, Howes, Poederooyen	Howes	3:43
4.	"Heaven's Gonna Wait"	Hoggard, Howes	Howes	4:07
5.	"We Are Unbreakable"	Hoggard, Howes, Wattenberg, Star, Fuhrmann	Howes	3:32
6.	"Young"	Hoggard, Howes, Poederooyen	Howes	3:24
7.	"Beautiful"	Hoggard, Rosin	Howes, Hoggard	3:23
8.	"Bullet for Your Dreams"	Hoggard, Howes, Poederooyen	Howes	3:03
9.	"Hot Mess"	Hoggard, Petersen, Sipe	Howes	3:06
10.	"Stormy"	Hoggard, Babyface	Howes	3:41
11.	"Last Call"	Hoggard, Feldmann	Howes	3:30
12.	"I Won't Let You Go (Darling)"	Hoggard, Rosin	Howes, Hoggard	8:34
Total length:				47:01

== Personnel ==
Credits adapted from album's liner notes.

Hedley

- Jacob Hoggard – vocals, acoustic guitar, keyboard
- Dave Rosin – electric guitar, textures, background vocals
- Tommy Mac – bass, background vocals
- Chris Crippin – drums, background vocals

Production

- Jacob Hoggard – producer
- Brian Howes – producer
- Serban Ghenea – mixing
- Chris Lord-Alge – mixing
- Mark Needham – mixing

== Charts ==
=== Weekly charts ===
Weekly chart performance for Storms
Chart (2011–12)	Peak position
Canadian Albums (Billboard)	2

=== Year-end charts ===
Year-end chart performance for Storms
Chart (2012)	Position
Canadian Albums (Billboard)	19

== Certifications ==
Region	Certification	Certified units/sales
Canada (Music Canada)	Platinum	80,000^{^}
^{^} Shipments figures based on certification alone.

== Release history ==
Release dates and formats for Storms
Country	Date	Format	Edition	Label(s)	Ref.
Canada	8 November 2011	CD; digital download	Standard; deluxe	Universal Music Canada	
Canada	22 May 2012	CD; digital download	Re-issue	Universal Music Canada	
United States	22 May 2012	Digital download	Standard	Universal Music Canada	
