= Ben Kaplan (producer) =

Canadian record producer

Ben Kaplan is a Canadian record producer and engineer based in Vancouver, British Columbia. He is most noted as the winner of the Jack Richardson Producer of the Year Award at the Juno Awards of 2020, for his work on Rare Americans' "Brittle Bones Nicky" and Mother Mother's "It's Alright".

Originally from London, Ontario, he is an alumnus of the Music Industry Arts program at Fanshawe College. He began his career as a production assistant to Garth Richardson on albums by the London-based heavy metal band Kittie, and later moved to Vancouver, where he and Garth Richardson were among the cofounders of Fader Mountain Sound.

== Awards ==
| Award | Year | Category | Work | Result | Ref(s) |
|---|---|---|---|---|---|
| Juno Awards | 2014 | Producer of the Year | "Let's Fall in Love" (Mother Mother) "Bit by Bit" (Mother Mother) | Nominated | |
| Juno Awards | 2018 | Recording Engineer of the Year | "Widowmaker" (Five Alarm Funk) "Speak" (Ninjaspy) | Nominated | |
| Juno Awards | 2019 | Recording Engineer of the Year | "Get Up" (Mother Mother) "It's Alright" (Mother Mother) | Nominated | |
| Juno Awards | 2020 | Producer of the Year | "Brittle Bones Nicky" (Rare Americans) "It's Alright" (Mother Mother) | Won | |
