= Jacob Hoggard =

Canadian singer-songwriter

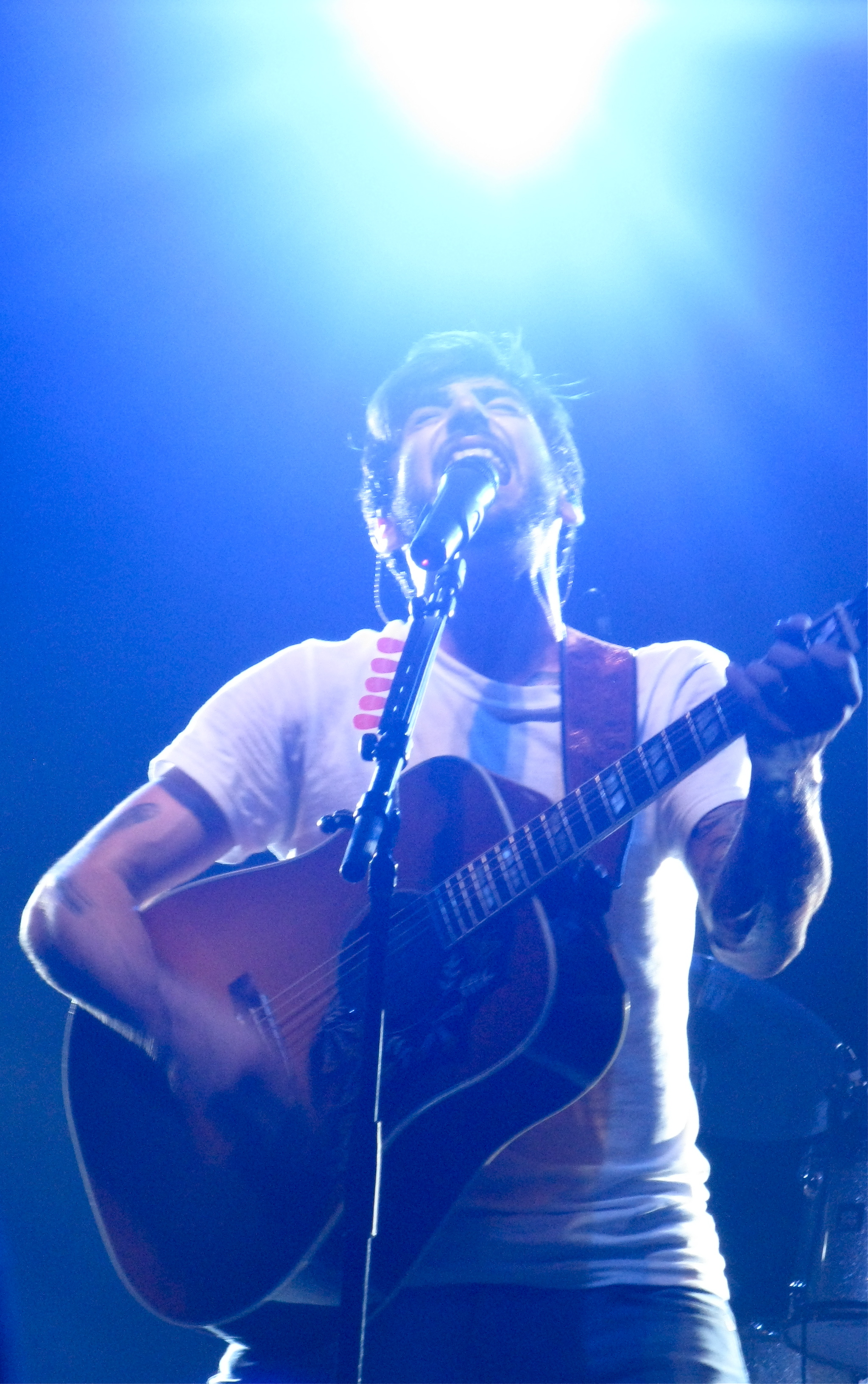
- Hoggard performing in 2008

Background information
- Born: Jacob William Hoggard; 1984 or 1985 (age 41–42); Burnaby, British Columbia, Canada
- Origin: Abbotsford, British Columbia, Canada
- Genres: Rock; pop; pop punk; pop rock
- Occupations: Singer, musician, songwriter
- Instruments: Vocals, guitar, piano
- Years active: 2004–2018
- Formerly of: Hedley

Jacob William Hoggard is a Canadian musician who was the lead singer for the pop rock band Hedley. Hoggard competed on the second season of Canadian Idol in 2004, where he placed third.

In 2018, Hoggard was arrested and charged with sexual assault against two women. In 2022, he was convicted on one count of sexual assault causing bodily harm, and acquitted on the other charge. He was sentenced to five years imprisonment. In 2024, he was found not guilty of a third charge of sexual assault by a jury in northeastern Ontario. After an appeal was dismissed by the Ontario Court of Appeal in 2024, Hoggard began serving a five-year sentence.

== Early life ==
Jacob Hoggard was born in Burnaby, British Columbia, Canada. He was raised in Abbotsford, British Columbia, and Surrey, British Columbia. He is of partial Italian origin. He was educated in Surrey, British Columbia, at Senator Reid Elementary School and Mennonite Educational Institute, Yale Secondary School in Abbotsford and at L.A. Matheson Secondary School, he was also in the City Central Learning Centre. Before appearing on Canadian Idol, Hoggard worked as a construction worker.

== Career ==
In 2003, Hoggard formed the band Hedley with Kevin Giesbrecht, Kevin Heeres, Ryan Federau, and Brandon McKay. Hoggard eventually started his career on Canadian Idol, who was challenged by his bandmates to appear on the show. He appeared on the second season of the show and auditioned in Vancouver after he had "been dragged to the audition after work" by his high school sweetheart performing "Forever in Blue Jeans". He advanced to the top 30 performing Billy Joel's "Only the Good Die Young". He soon made it to the top ten where he sang the songs "Put Your Head on My Shoulder" and "Space Oddity". Hoggard placed third on the show.

After Canadian Idol, he re-formed Hedley with Dave Rosin, Tommy Mac and Chris Crippin and signed to Universal Music Canada in 2005. The band later released their debut single "On My Own", which reached number one on the Canadian Singles Chart. They released the albums Hedley, Famous Last Words and The Show Must Go in 2005, 2007 and 2009, respectively. Hoggard went on to produce the band's next four studio releases, Storms (2011), Wild Life (2013), Hello (2015) and Cageless (2017). He also co-wrote many of the group's hits including "Crazy for You", "Perfect", "For the Nights I Can't Remember" and "Anything". Hoggard along with Brian Howes was nominated at the 2014 Juno Awards for Producer of the Year.

In 2008, he co-wrote the songs "Tonight, I Love You" and "Kids" for Canadian pop rock band The Latency. In 2010, Hoggard part taken in Young Artists for Haiti to perform a rendition of K'naan's "Wavin' Flag". The song topped the Canadian Hot 100. In 2012, he also took part in Artists Against Bullying to record and release a remake of Cyndi Lauper's "True Colors" for Bullying Awareness Week. Hoggard hosted the Juno Awards of 2015. He co-wrote the single "Highway" by Canadian rock band Bleeker.

== Personal life ==
Hoggard married his high school sweetheart in 2005, which ended in divorce in 2009. Hoggard married Canadian actress Rebekah Asselstine on 31 December 2018. Hoggard along with Hedley, partnered with Free The Children, travelling to Kenya in 2010 and India in 2011, promoting awareness about poverty and helping those in need. He also became the ambassador for the Canadian Cancer Society and precursor to WE Charity.

== Sexual offences ==
=== London investigation, 2005 ===
In 2005, Hoggard and his bandmates were investigated in connection with a sexual assault in London, Ontario. A minor was found unconscious and shoeless outside a venue where the band had played, with Rohypnol detected in her blood. The police investigation ended when the victim refused a rape kit and the band sent a letter to the venue management stating that any discussion of the incident would result in a lawsuit.

=== Sexual assault conviction: Toronto, 2022 ===
On 23 July 2018, Hoggard was charged with one count of sexual interference and two counts of sexual assault causing bodily harm, involving a child under 16 and an adult woman. His trial was postponed multiple times before commencing in May 2022. At the time his trial began, Hoggard was working as a carpenter in British Columbia. On 5 June 2022, a Toronto jury found 37-year-old Hoggard guilty of sexual assault causing bodily harm against an Ottawa woman in the fall of 2016. Hoggard was also acquitted of sexually assaulting a 16-year-old fan and one count of sexual interference. On 20 October 2022, Hoggard was sentenced to five years in prison.

=== Sexual assault acquittal: Kirkland Lake, 2024 ===
Hoggard was also charged in March 2022 with sexual assault causing bodily harm regarding a June 2016 encounter in Kirkland Lake, Ontario; the charge was made public on 2 June. Hoggard was scheduled to appear in court on 4 August 2022. The complainant testified in September 2024 that Hoggard allegedly raped, hit, and choked her before urinating on her in a hotel room after a Hedley concert. Hoggard was acquitted of the charge on 4 October 2024.

=== Appeals and parole ===
On 16 August 2024, the Ontario Court of Appeal upheld Hoggard's 2022 sexual assault conviction, dismissing his appeal and confirming his five-year prison sentence. On receiving the decision of the Court of Appeal, Hoggard turned himself in and began to serve his sentence. On 4 September 2024, Hoggard filed a notice that he would apply to the Supreme Court of Canada for leave to appeal the decision of the Court of Appeal.

On 13 September, a judge of the Ontario Court of Appeal dismissed Hoggard's application for bail pending his application for leave to appeal to the Supreme Court. Hoggard withdrew his application for leave to appeal on 4 October 2024.

In June 2026, Hoggard was granted a six-months day parole in a halfway home. His release included strict conditions, such as mandatory supervision around underage females and close monitoring of his cell phone and chat histories.

== Discography ==
- Hedley (2005)
- Famous Last Words (2007)
- The Show Must Go (2009)
- Storms (2011)
- Wild Life (2013)
- Hello (2015)
- Cageless (2017)

== Filmography ==
Week	Theme	Song choice	Artist	Result
Audition	N/A	"Forever in Blue Jeans"	Neil Diamond	Advanced
Top 32	N/A	"Only the Good Die Young"	Billy Joel	Advanced
Top 10	Canadian Hits	"Put Your Head on My Shoulder"	Paul Anka	Safe
Top 9	British Invasion	"Space Oddity"	David Bowie	Safe
Top 8	Rock & Roll	"Everything"	Lifehouse	Safe
Top 7	Lionel Richie	"Brick House"	Lionel Richie	Safe
Top 6	Gordon Lightfoot	"Sundown"	Gordon Lightfoot	Bottom 2
Top 5	Summertime Hits	"I Don't Want to Miss a Thing"	Aerosmith	Safe
Top 4	Standards	"Straighten Up And Fly Right" "Unforgettable"	Nat King Cole	Safe
Top 3	Judges' Choice	"If You Don't Know Me by Now" "I Want You to Want Me"	Harold Melvin & the Blue Notes; Cheap Trick	Eliminated
