= Dave Rosin =

Canadian guitarist and singer (born 1981)

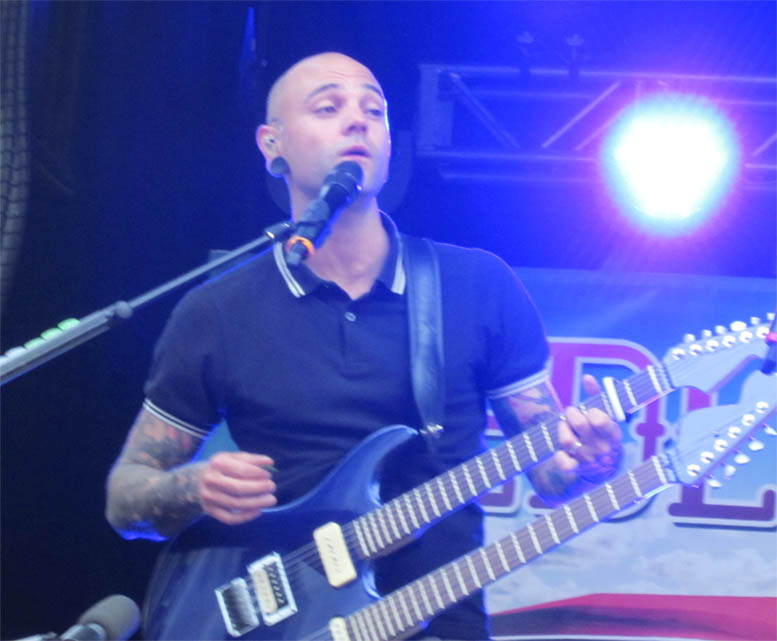
- Rosin in 2012

Background information
- Birth name: David Cameron Rosin
- Born: July 28, 1981 (age 43)
- Origin: Prince George, British Columbia, Canada
- Genres: Rock, pop
- Occupation: Guitarist
- Instruments: Guitar, background vocals
- Years active: 2003–2018
- Labels: Capitol Records; Universal Music Canada
- Formerly of: Everything After; Hedley

Dave Cameron Rosin (born July 28, 1981) is a Canadian guitarist and singer. Rosin was the lead guitarist of the rock band Hedley.

== Early life ==
Rosin was born and raised in Prince George, British Columbia. He used to play minor league hockey. Rosin won a Citizen paper carrier contest where he earned his first guitar.

== Career ==
Prior to joining Hedley, Rosin played in a band called Day Theory in 2003. He was also a part of the band Everything After with Tommy Mac and Chris Crippin before they met Jacob Hoggard in 2004 and decided to consociate and reform Hedley.

The band has released seven albums, which Rosin was featured in all the releases. In 2018, the band took an indefinite hiatus due to sexual assault allegations made against Hoggard.

Before signing with Capitol Records and Universal Music Canada, Rosin had record deals from various record labels, which included Island Records and Universal Music Group.

== Equipment ==
Rosin uses a Boogie Mark Five Head amp, as well as a Rectifier Cabinets 1x12 Recto Cabinet and a Cabinet Simulators CabClone. He uses a Voodoo Lab Power Pedal.

== Personal life ==
Rosin resides on the Sunshine Coast, British Columbia. Around 2018, he became a father, having one child.

== Discography ==
with Hedley

- Hedley (2005)
- Famous Last Words (2007)
- The Show Must Go (2009)
- Go with the Show (2010)
- Storms (2011)
- Wild Life (2013)
- Hello (2015)
- Cageless (2017)
