= Chris Crippin =

Canadian drummer (born 1974)

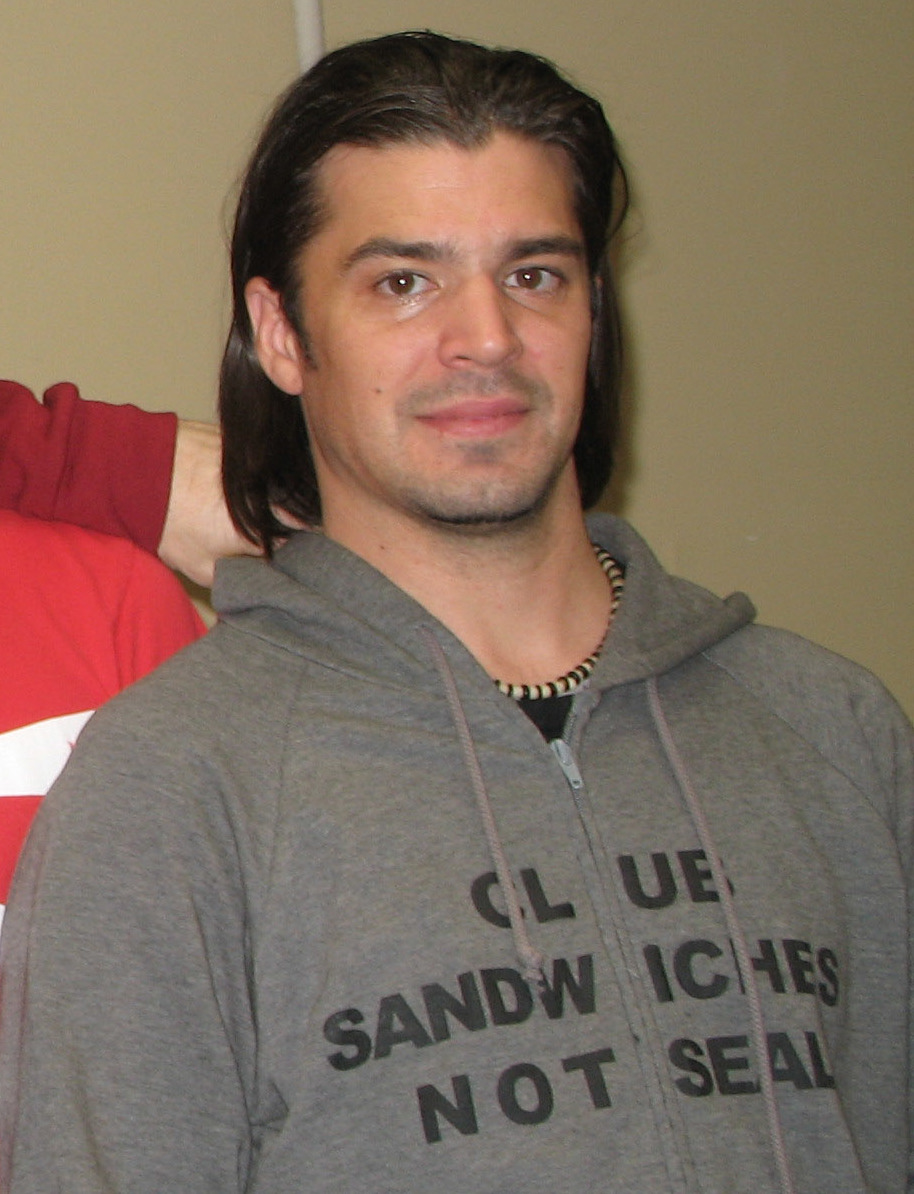
- Crippin in 2008

Background information
- Born: Christian Robert Crippin; August 4, 1974 (age 52)
- Origin: Surrey, British Columbia, Canada
- Genres: Rock, punk rock
- Occupation: Drummer
- Years active: 1996–present
- Formerly of: Everything After; Hedley

Chris Crippin (born August 4, 1974) is a Canadian musician, best known as the former drummer of the rock band Hedley. Crippin departed the band in 2017.

Outside of Hedley, Crippin worked on more than 130 records as a drum tech and session drummer. He was the drum technician on the 2000 album Drawing Black Lines by the American band Project 86. He also played drums for Bif Naked. In 2018, Crippin started a new project called MrCrippin.

== Early life ==
Crippin began to have an interest in music at a very young age. It wasn't until his mid-teen years when he started learning how to play drums. He began enrolling in drum lessons in June 1989, working with Pete Barone. He was hired by Ray Ayotte, founder of Ayotte Drums, to work in his shop in Vancouver.

== Career ==
In 1996, Crippin formed the band, The Human Resistance Program. He also worked as a drum technician and played drums for several different artists. Crippin worked with producer Bruce Fairbairn on four albums. He also was the drum technician on the albums, Drawing Black Lines (2000) and L.D. 50 (2000) by Project 86 and Mudvayne respectively. In 1999, Crippin joined Bif Naked and spent two years touring with the musician. While touring with the artist, he was also involved in his own music projects such as Sun Like Star, Gasm, 7Lies, and Noise Therapy. He later joined Everything After, working with Chad Kroeger and Garth Richardson, before disbanding in 2004. Crippin formed a new project called Bomb the Past, a group he fronted.

Crippin spent 11 years with Hedley and released six studio albums with the group. In 2018, it was reported that Crippin had been officially fired by the band in March 2017.

Amidst the allegations against lead singer Jacob Hoggard from Hedley, Crippin spoke out against his former band mate. He stated he was "extremely rude" and was "hard to work with." Since then, Crippin started his own band called MrCrippin in 2018 and released his debut single "Big Brother" in 2021.

Crippin has also worked as a drum technician for the likes of 3 Inches of Blood, Billy Talent, From Autumn to Ashes and Rod Laver. He live tech for musicians including Gene Hoglan and Ian Browne. In March 2011, Crippin embarked on an All Access Music Tour, performing drums and doing Q&A's at three Long & McQuade stores in British Columbia and Ontario.

== Personal life ==
Crippin owns a home studio in Gatineau, Quebec. He also owns two companies, Crippin Health Inc. and Mrdrumsalot Music Inc.

== Discography ==
with Project 86

- Drawing Black Lines (2000)

with Hedley

- Hedley (2005)
- Famous Last Words (2007)
- The Show Must Go (2009)
- Storms (2011)
- Wild Life (2013)
- Hello (2015)

=== Albums ===
List of albums with selected details
Title	Album details
#MeTooDriveBy	Released: April 12, 2024; Label: MrDrumsAlot Music Inc.; Format: Digital download

=== Singles ===
List of singles as MrCrippin
Title	Year	Album
"Big Brother"	2021	Non-album singles
"Fight"	2021	Non-album singles
"Lucky"	2021	Non-album singles
"Dream"	2021	Non-album singles
"Take It to Heart"	2021	Non-album singles

=== Additional credits ===
Title	Year	Artist(s)	Notes	Ref.
Drawing Black Lines	2000	Project 86	Drum technician	
L.D. 50	2000	Mudvayne	Drum technician	
In a Perfect World	2001	Rod Laver	Drum technician	
Purge	2001	Bif Naked	Drums	
Cul-De-Sac	2003	V Shape Mind	Drum technician	
Self-Destructive Pattern	2003	Spineshank	Drum technician	
A Cruel World	2005	Bloodsimple	Drum technician	
Abandon Your Friends	2005	From Autumn to Ashes	Drum technician	
Art of Dying	2006	Art of Dying	Drum technician	
Fire Up the Blades	2007	3 Inches of Blood	Drum technician	
Dead Silence	2012	Billy Talent	Drum technician	
