= Cannonball (disambiguation) =

A cannonball is round shot ammunition for a cannon.

Cannonball or Cannon Ball may also refer to:

== Arts and entertainment ==
=== Film and television ===
- Cannonball (film), a 1976 film inspired by Erwin "Cannonball" Baker
- Cannonball (TV series), a show about two truck drivers
- Cannonball (Australian game show)
- Cannonball (British game show)
- Cannonball (American game show), a 2020 show based on the British game show
- "Cannonball", a 2003 episode of Lilo & Stitch: The Series
- Hooterville Cannonball, a fictional train in the television series Petticoat Junction

=== Music ===
==== Albums ====
- Cannonball (album), by Pat Green, 2006
- Cannonball!!!, by Bleubird, 2012

==== Songs ====
- "Wabash Cannonball", American folk song
- "Cannonball" (The Breeders song), 1993
- "Cannonball" (Damien Rice song), 2002; covered by Little Mix, 2011
- "Cannonball" (Duane Eddy song), 1958
- "Cannonball" (Lea Michele song), 2013
- "Cannonball" (Showtek and Justin Prime song), 2013
- "Cannonball" (Skylar Grey song), 2015
- "Cannonball" (Supertramp song), 1985
- "Cannonball" (Tom Dice song), 2017
- "Cannonball" (ZZ Ward song), 2017
- "Cannonball", by Alestorm from Seventh Rum of a Seventh Rum, 2022
- "Cannonball", by Avril Lavigne from Love Sux, 2022
- "Cannonball", by Brandi Carlile from The Story, 2007
- "Cannonball", by Dog Eat Dog, 2005
- "Cannonball", by Five Iron Frenzy from The End Is Near, 2004
- "Cannonball", by Grouplove from Big Mess, 2016
- "Cannonball", by Gudda Gudda, featuring Drake, 2009
- "Cannonball", by Primal Fear from Apocalypse, 2018

==== Fictional characters ====
- Cannonball (Marvel Comics), a Marvel Comics character associated with the X-Men
- Cannonball, a sidekick character played by Dub Taylor in over 50 Western films
- Cannonball, a fictional character in the G.I. Joe universe
- Cannonball (Transformers), a Decepticon space pirate in the Transformers toy line
- Cannonball (Experiment X-520), a character in the Lilo & Stitch franchise

=== Literature ===
- Cannonball (novel), by Joseph McElroy
- "Cannonball" (short story), a science-fiction short story by Liu Cixin

== Biology ==
- Couroupita guianensis, a species of evergreen tree commonly called the cannonball tree
- Sphaerobolus, a genus commonly known as the cannonball fungi
- Cannonball jellyfish, a species of jellyfish

== People ==
- Cannonball (nickname), a list of people

== Places ==
- Cannon Ball, North Dakota, a city
- Cannonball River, North Dakota, a tributary of the Missouri River
- Cannonball Cliffs, Alexander Island, Antarctica

== Trains ==
- Cannon Ball, a Boston & Maine Railroad train from Boston to Plymouth, New Hampshire
- Cannonball (LIRR train), a seasonal train operated by the Long Island Rail Road along its Montauk Branch
- Cannonball (Milwaukee Road train), the nickname for a commuter train operated by the Milwaukee Road from Watertown to Milwaukee, Wisconsin until 1972
- Cannon Ball, a train operated by the Norfolk & Western Railway with the Pennsylvania Railroad, Richmond, Fredericksburg and Potomac Railroad, and the Atlantic Coast Line Railroad, from New York to Norfolk, Virginia
- Georgia Cannonball, a Georgia Railroad train running between Atlanta and Augusta, Georgia
- Wabash Cannon Ball (train), a Wabash Railroad train operating 1950 to 1971

== Other uses ==
- Cannonball (diving), a diving maneuver
- Operation Cannonball, a Central Intelligence Agency operation
- Cannonball (missile), originally intended to be a US Navy anti-ship missile, later developed as an anti-tank missile
- Cannonball Musical Instruments, a Salt Lake City-based musical instrument manufacturer
- Cannon Ball roller coaster, a wooden roller coaster at Lake Winnepesaukah, Georgia/Tennessee border
- Cannon Ball Route, an early auto route between Kansas City and Chicago
- Cannonball Path, a shared-use trail in Madison, Wisconsin
- Cannonball Motorcycle Club, an outlaw motorcycle club in Finland

== See also ==
- Cannonball problem, a mathematical problem
- Wabash Cannonball (disambiguation)
- Cannonball House (disambiguation)
- Cannonball Run (disambiguation)
- Cannonball Formation, a geologic formation in North Dakota
- RX J0822−4300, a neutron star often called a "Cosmic Cannonball"
- Cannon & Ball, a British comedy double act
- Kanonball, a mod for the video game Half-Life, see List of GoldSrc mods
