= Better Days =

Better Days may refer to:

== Film, television and comics ==
- Better Days (2019 film), a Chinese drama film
- Better Days (2023 film), a Canadian comedy-drama film
- Better Days (TV series), a 1986 American sitcom
- Serenity: Better Days, a 2008 comic book miniseries based on the TV series Firefly and the film Serenity

== Music ==
=== Albums ===
- Better Days (The Blackbyrds album) or the title song, 1980
- Better Days (Guy Clark album) or the title song, 1983
- Better Days (Joe album) or the title song, 2001
- Better Days (Robbie Seay Band album) or the title song, 2005
- Better Days (Southside Johnny & The Asbury Jukes album) or the title song, 1991
- Better Days (Susan Tedeschi album) or the title song, 1995
- Better Days (Tom Dice album) or the title song (see below), 2018
- Better Days (Yellowcard album) or the title song, 2025
- Better Days (EP) or the title song, by God Forbid, 2003
- Better Dayz, by Tupac Shakur, or the title song, 2002
- Better Days, by the Bruisers, 2001
- Better Days, by Chuck Fenda, or the title song, 2005
- Better Days, by Edwin, 2006
- Better Days, by Paul Butterfield, 1973
- Better Days, by Tom Frager, 2009

=== Songs ===
- "Better Days" (Ant Clemons song), 2020
- "Better Days" (Baker Boy, Dallas Woods and Sampa the Great song), 2020
- "Better Days" (Benjamin Ingrosso song), 2024
- "Better Days" (Bruce Springsteen song), 1992
- "Better Days" (Goo Goo Dolls song), 2005
- "Better Days" (Hedley song), 2017
- "Better Days" (Natalia Gutiérrez and Angelo song), 2010
- "Better Days" (Neiked, Mae Muller and Polo G song), 2021
- "Better Days" (OneRepublic song), 2020
- "Better Days" (Pete Murray song), 2005
- "Better Days" (Tom Dice song), 2018
- "Better Days" (WC song), 1998
- "Better Days (And the Bottom Drops Out)", by Citizen King, 1999
- "Better Days", by Badfinger from No Dice, 1970
- "Better Days", by Bekka & Billy, 1997
- "Better Days", by Breaking Benjamin from Shallow Bay: The Best of Breaking Benjamin, 2011
- "Better Days", by Depeche Mode, a B-side of the single "Suffer Well", 2006
- "Better Days", by Dermot Kennedy, 2021
- "Better Days", by Dianne Reeves from Dianne Reeves, 1987
- "Better Days", by the Doobie Brothers from Liberté, 2021
- "Better Days", by Eddie Vedder from the soundtrack of the film Eat Pray Love, 2010
- "Better Days", by Edward Sharpe and the Magnetic Zeros from Edward Sharpe and the Magnetic Zeros, 2013
- "Better Days", by Elemeno P from Elemeno P, 2008
- "Better Days", by Emerson, Lake & Palmer from Black Moon, 1992
- "Better Days", by Graham Nash from Songs for Beginners, 1971
- "Better Days", by Gun from Taking On the World, 1989
- "Better Days", by Janet Jackson from All for You, 2001
- "Better Days", by JID from The Forever Story, 2022
- "Better Days", by the Kills from God Games, 2023
- "Better Days", by Liam Gallagher from C'mon You Know, 2022
- "Better Days", by New Kids on the Block from Still Kids, 2024
- "Better Days", by Oh Land from Loop Soup, 2023
- "Better Days", by the Ozark Mountain Daredevils, the B-side of the single "Jackie Blue", 1975
- "Better Days", by Paul Doucette, 2004
- "Better Days", by Ringo Starr from What's My Name, 2019
- "Better Days", by Shed Seven from Instant Pleasures, 2017
- "Better Days", by Speech Debelle from Speech Therapy, 2009
- "Better Days", by Sum 41 from 13 Voices, 2016
- "Better Days", by Supertramp from Brother Where You Bound, 1985
- "Better Days", by TQ from They Never Saw Me Coming, 1998
- "Better Days", by Victoria Monét, 2016
- "Better Days", by the Wolfmen from Modernity Killed Every Night, 2008
- "Better Days", by Zach Bryan featuring John Mayer from The Great American Bar Scene, 2024
- "Outside (Better Days)", by Blueface, 2021

== See also ==
- Better Day (disambiguation)
