= Heart for Sale =

Studio album by Tom Dice
- Released: 3 May 2012
- Recorded: 2011
- Genre: Pop
- Label: Sonic Angel
- Producer: Jeroen Swinnen; John Mamann; JPHT

Tom Dice chronology
Teardrops (2010)	Heart for Sale (2012)	I've Come a Long Way (2016)

Singles from Heart for Sale
- 1. "Utopia" Released: 28 February 2012; 2. "Out at Sea" Released: 4 May 2012; 3. "Drive Me to Paris" Released: 22 October 2012; 4. "Let Me In" Released: 15 April 2013

Heart for Sale is the second studio album by Belgian singer-songwriter, Tom Dice. It was released on 3 May 2012. The album reached number 11 in Belgium. The album includes the singles "Utopia", "Out At Sea", "Drive Me to Paris" and "Let Me In".

== Singles ==
"Utopia" was the first single to be released from the album on 28 February 2012, the single peaked to number 21 in Belgium. "Out At Sea" was the second single released from the album on 4 May 2012. "Drive Me to Paris" was the third single released from the album on 22 October 2012. "Let Me In" was the fourth single released from the album on 15 April 2013.

== Track listing ==
No.	Title	Writer(s)	Producer(s)	Length
1.	"Starting a New Life"	Tom Dice	Jeroen Swinnen	3:49
2.	"Utopia"	Dice; Swinnen; Ashley Hicklin; Tom Eeckhout	Swinnen	3:33
3.	"Out at Sea"	Dice; Swinnen; Dazzled Kid	Swinnen	3:28
4.	"Drive Me to Paris"	Dice; Swinnen; Hicklin	Swinnen	3:57
5.	"Marry Me"	Dice	Swinnen	4:41
6.	"Let Me In"	Dice; Dion Howell	Swinnen	4:04
7.	"Never Gonna Stop"	Dice; Swinnen; Kid	Swinnen	2:55
8.	"As If I'm On Drugs"	Dice	Swinnen	4:56
9.	"Heart for Sale"	Dice; Swinnen; Hicklin	Swinnen	3:33
10.	"Firekisses"	Dice; Swinnen; Kid	Swinnen	5:09
11.	"Wonderful"	Dice; Dave Gibson	Swinnen	4:16
12.	"Il nous faut" (duet with Elisa Tovati)	Dice; John Mamann; Cécile Gabrié	John Mamann; JPHT	3:07

== Chart performance ==
=== Weekly charts ===
Chart (2012)	Peak position
Belgian Albums (Ultratop Flanders)	11
Belgian Albums (Ultratop Wallonia)	73

== Release history ==
Region	Date	Format	Label
Belgium	3 May 2012	Digital download	SonicAngel
