= Concord Museum =

Museum of local history in Concord, Massachusetts

Coordinates: 42°27′27.7″N 71°20′31.7″W

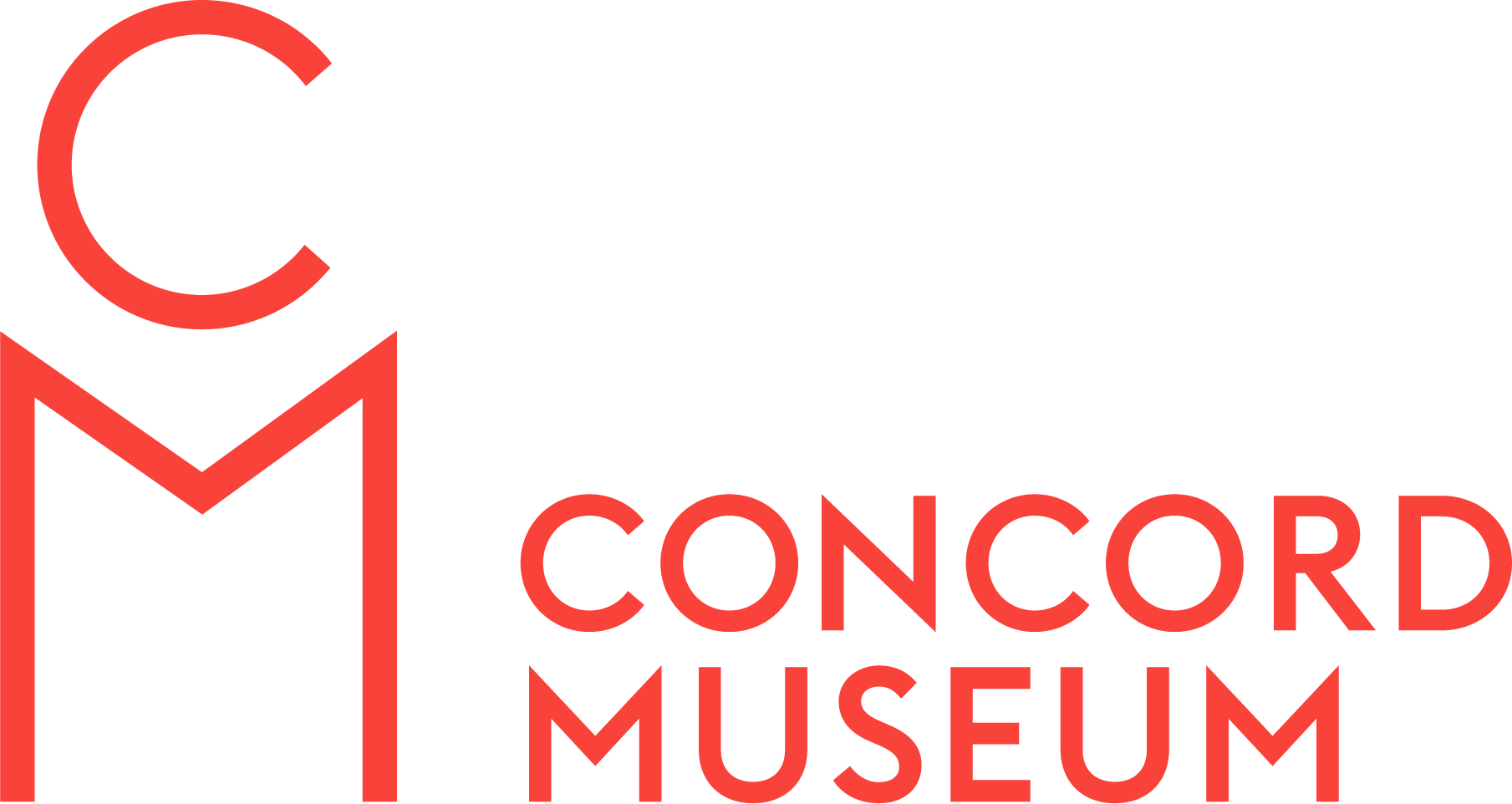
- Former name: Concord Antiquarian Society
- Established: 1886
- Location: 53 Cambridge Turnpike, Concord, MA 01742-3701
- Type: History museum
- Accreditation: American Alliance of Museums
- Key holdings: Paul Revere’s lantern, Henry David Thoreau’s writing desk, and the original study of Ralph Waldo Emerson.
- Collection size: 45,000+
- Founder: Cummings E. Davis
- Director: Amanda Lahikainen
- Curators: David Wood (Curator), Christie Jackson (Curator and Director of Exhibitions).
- Architects: Harry Little (1930), Graham Gund (1991), and Design Lab Architects (2018).
- Website: https://concordmuseum.org/

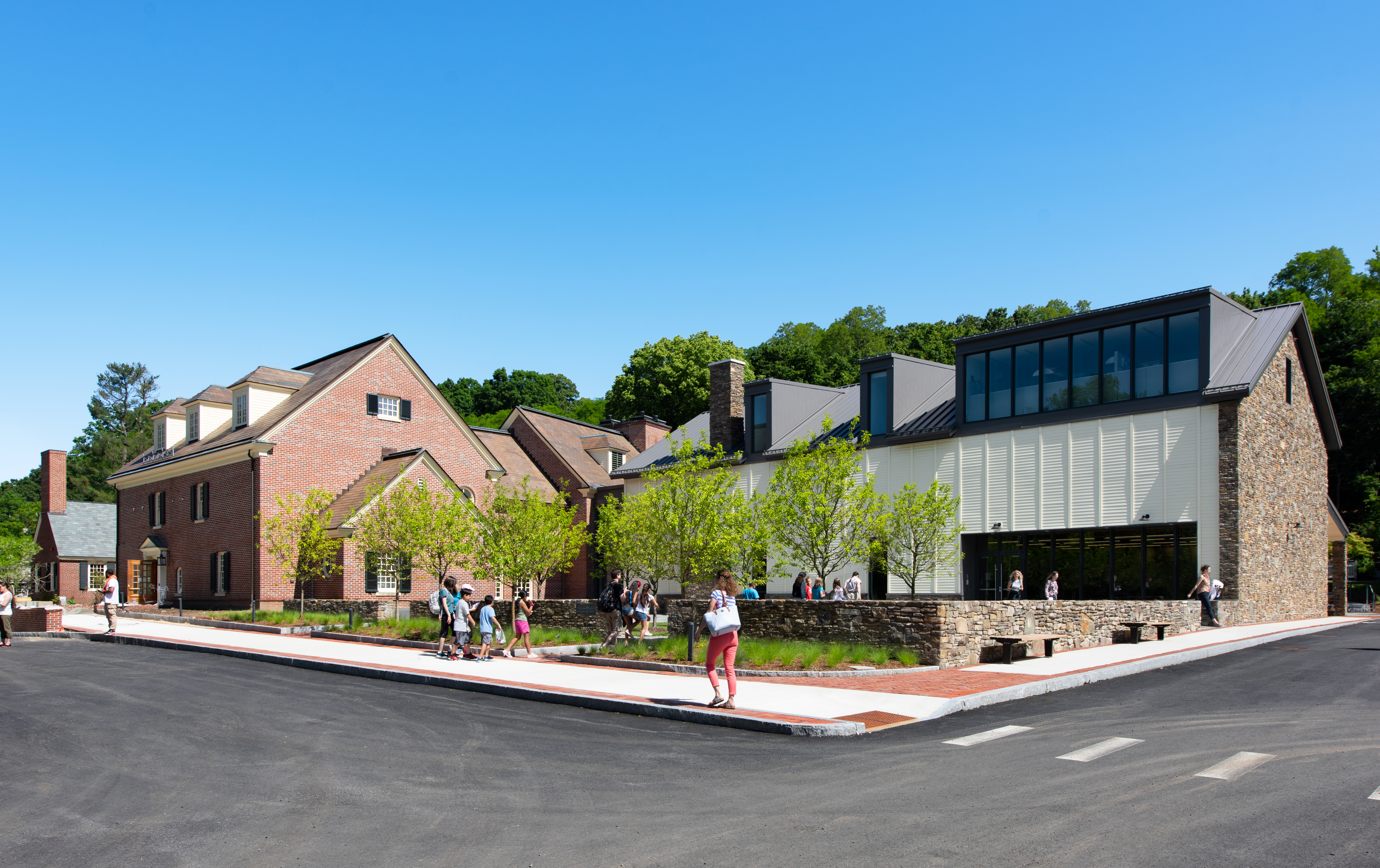
The Concord Museum.

The Concord Museum connects people to the history of Concord, Massachusetts, and its influence on American cultural, political, environmental, and literary life. Founded in 1886, the Museum houses a collection of American material culture and decorative arts in the country, consisting of over 45,000 objects that bring Concord’s past to life.

The Museum showcases Concord’s history, including Concord’s role in the beginning of the American Revolution, the writings of Transcendentalists, the history and continued presence of local Indigenous communities, a legacy of social justice activism, and innovations in education and agriculture. The Museum offers hands-on school programming and teacher resources, as well as lifelong learning opportunities through exhibitions and public programs.

In 2025, the Concord Museum received national recognition as the #1 ‘Best Small Town Museum’ by USA Today 10Best Readers' Choice Award program in 2025 and won another top 10Best award once again in 2026.

== Museum History ==
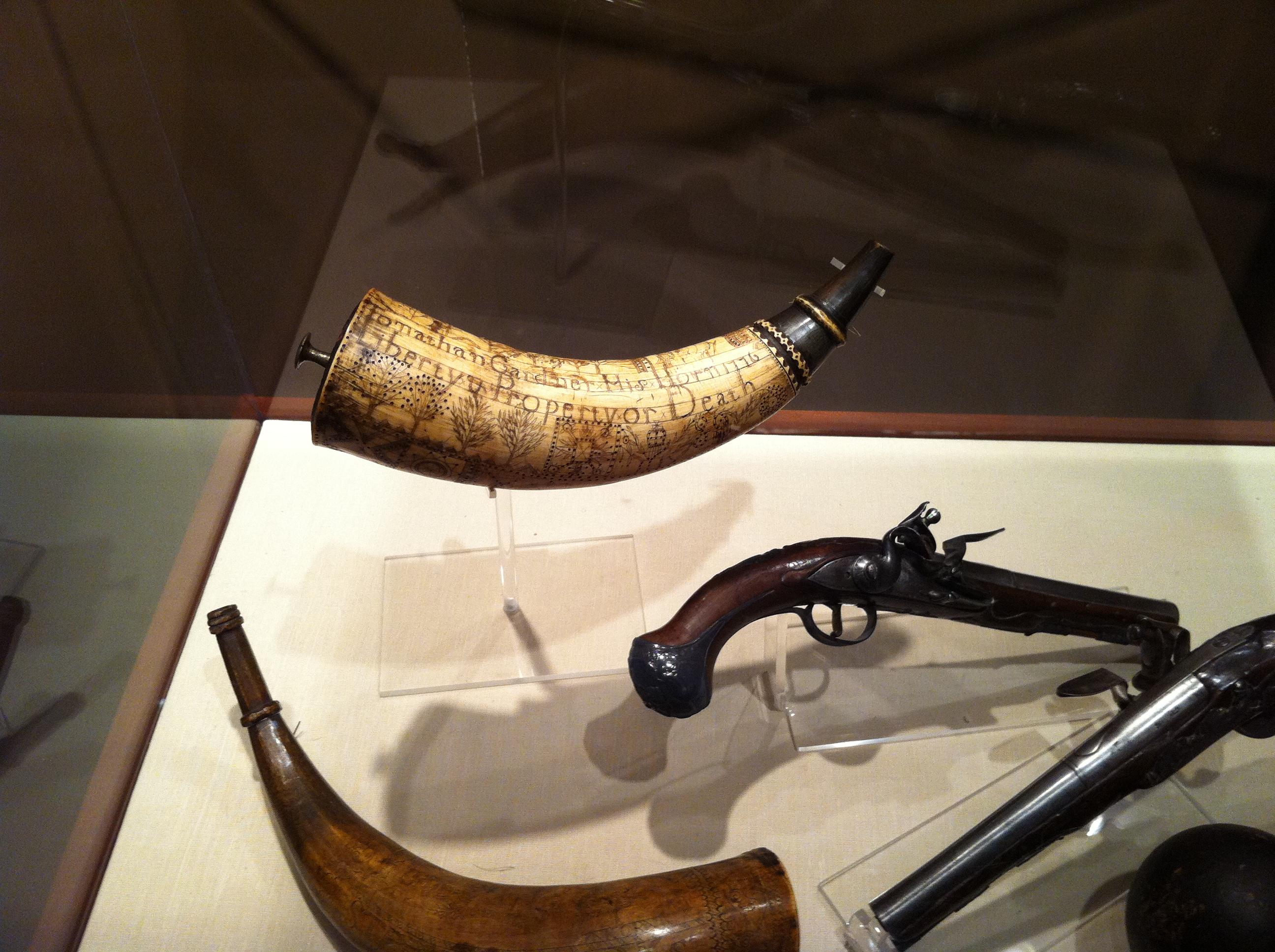
Powder horn and gun in the Concord Museum

The Concord Museum originated in the private collection of Cummings E. Davis (1816–1896), who moved to Concord in 1850. Davis collected local objects from the 17th and 18th centuries, objects associated with the Battles of Lexington and Concord, and objects connected to Henry David Thoreau. By 1860 he was displaying the collection to visitors, and by the 1875 centennial of the Battles of Lexington and Concord, his Revolutionary War artifacts had attracted regional attention.

In 1881, a group of Concord residents led by John Shepard Keyes arranged for a larger space in the town's former courthouse to house and display Davis's collection. In 1886, Davis transferred approximately 2,000 objects to the newly established Concord Antiquarian Society, which was formed to preserve and interpret the collection. The following year, the Society purchased the former home of saddler Reuben Brown to display the collection and provide housing for Davis.

In 1930, the Concord Antiquarian Society opened a new museum building, designed by architect Harry Little, at the intersection of Lexington Road and Cambridge Turnpike. The museum expanded its public education efforts in the 1970s, appointing its first professional director and developing school and public programs. The Davis Building, an education and administrative facility, was added in 1981, and the institution adopted the name Concord Museum in 1984. A major addition designed by Graham Gund opened in 1991 and included three changing exhibition galleries, a theater, and expanded visitor amenities. The museum later completed the New Museum Experience, a renovation project that included redesigned interactive galleries, updated collections storage, and the Rasmussen Education Center in 2018.

== Collection ==
The collection numbers over 45,000 objects, spanning the Indigenous history in the region (starting at least 12,000 years ago) to the history of the town of Concord (starting in the seventeenth century), extending to the present day. The collection includes archaeological items, furniture, ceramics, silver and pewter, household goods, photographs, documents, prints, paintings, historic clothing, and domestic textiles.

The museum's Henry David Thoreau Collection is the world's largest collection of objects associated with the author of Walden. It includes more than 250 artifacts, containing furniture, ceramics, glassware, metalwork, books, photographs, manuscripts, and textiles. Notable objects include Thoreau's desk and flute; a manuscript leaf from his essay notes for "Walking"; and the bed and chair from his cabin at Walden Pond.

The museum is home to hundreds of objects related to the American Revolution, including muskets, powder horns, documents, and personal items associated with April 19,1775. Among its best-known artifacts is the original lantern that was used as a signal in the belfry of Old North Church in Boston on April 18, 1775, informing colonial militia in Charlestown that British troops were moving by sea. The signal was later popularized by Henry Wadsworth Longfellow's poem "Paul Revere's Ride."

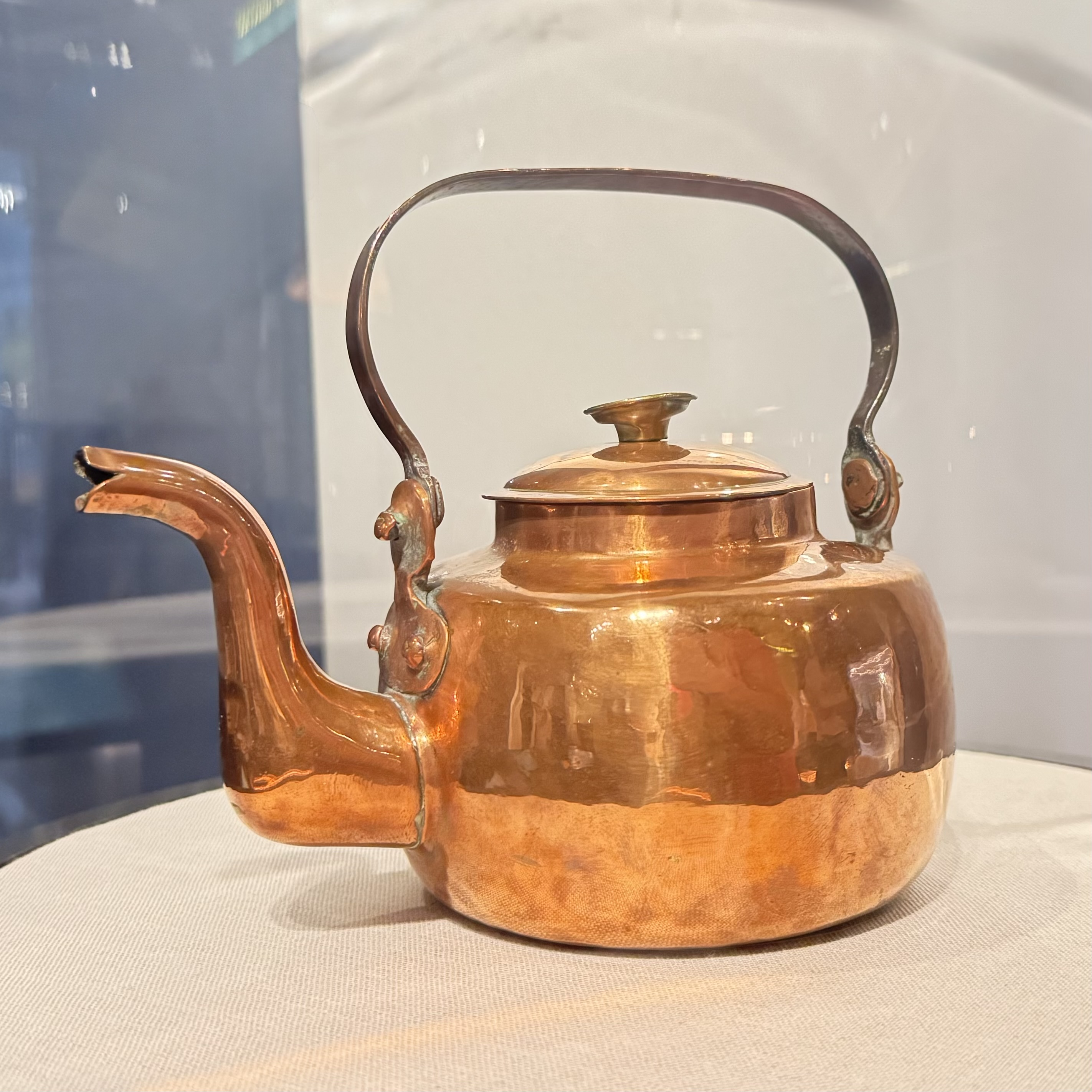
Copper tea kettle used by Louisa May Alcott while working as a Union Army nurse in Washington, D.C., during the Civil War.

Its decorative arts collection includes 17th-, 18th-, and 19th- century furniture, clocks, looking glasses, textiles, ceramics, and metalware. These objects are displayed in period rooms representing an early 18th-century chamber, a mid 18th-century chamber, an early 19th-century chamber, and a 19th-century neoclassical dining parlor. In addition to these period rooms, the Museum stewards Ralph Waldo Emerson's original study, including his books and furnishings.

Additional collection areas include Indigenous stone tools, Puritan household goods, cattle-show posters, clocks and machinery manufactured in Concord, and works by renowned sculptor Daniel Chester French.

The Concord Museum features a rotating schedule of special exhibitions alongside its permanent collection.

=== Highlights ===
Some highlights of the collection include:

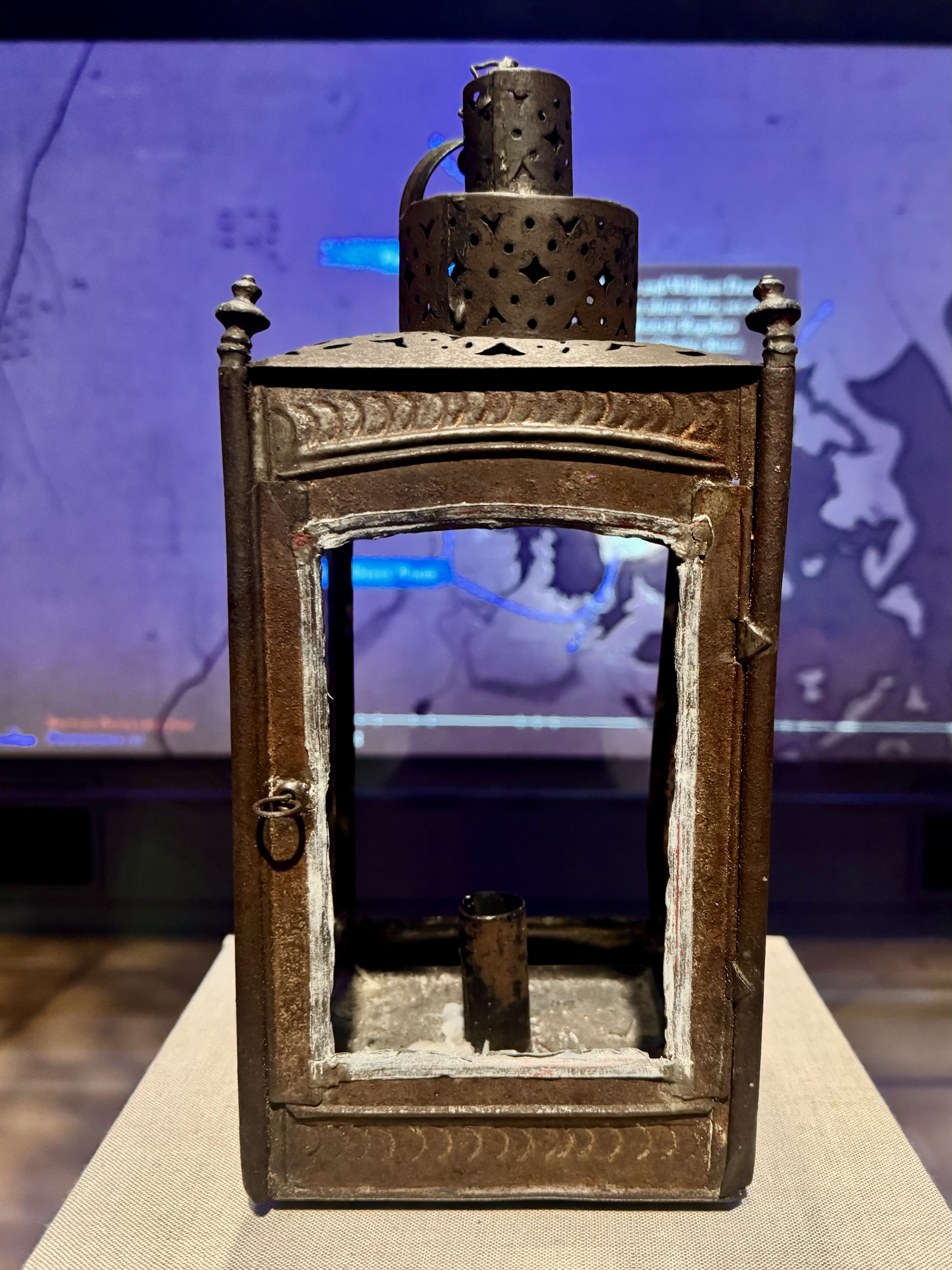
One of the lanterns hung as a signal in the belfry of Christ Church (Old North Church) in Boston on the night of April 18, 1775.

- The original lantern from Paul Revere’s famed midnight ride, hung in the belfry of the Old North Church on the night of April 18, 1775, later mortalized in the 1860 poem "Paul Revere's Ride" by Henry Wadsworth Longfellow.
- Original American Revolution historical objects including powder horns, muskets, cannonballs, and military supplies from the day of the “shot heard round the world”

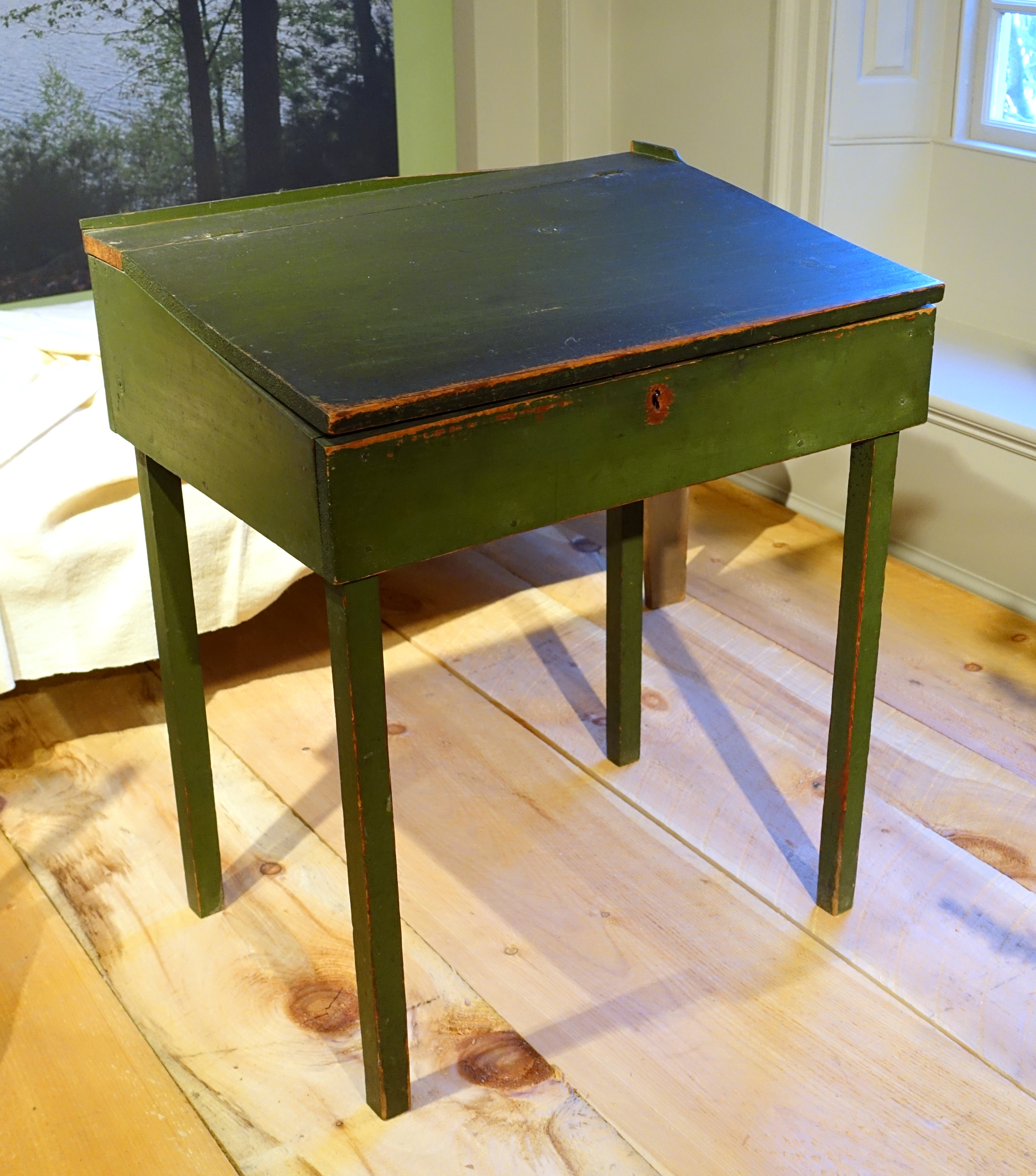
Desk of Henry David Thoreau

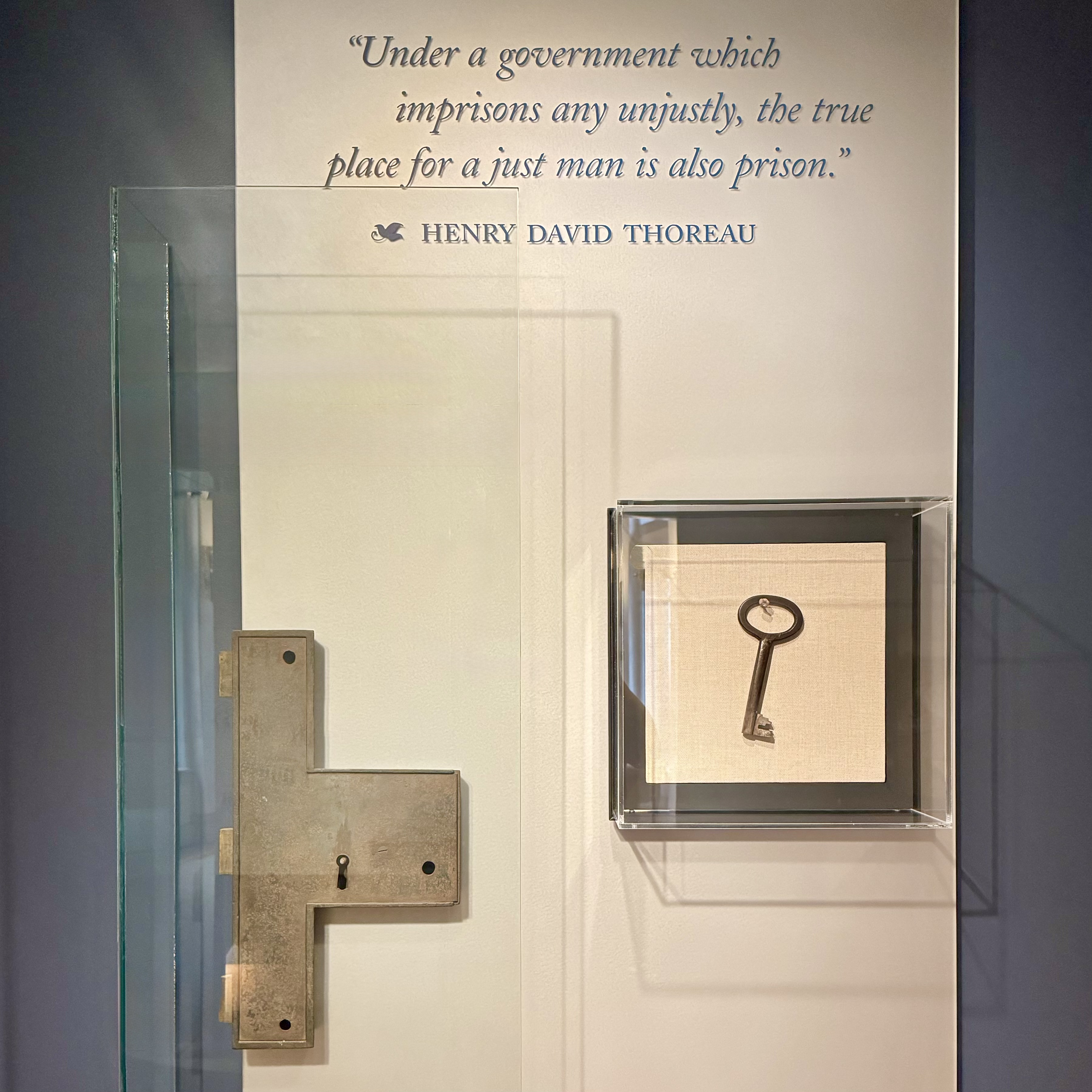
- Lock and Key from Concord Jail where Thoreau spent the night in July, 1846, after refusing to pay the poll tax.
  The world's largest collection of objects related to Thoreau (over 250 objects), including the bed, desk, and chair from his cabin at Walden Pond, where Thoreau wrote his 1849 book A Week on the Concord and Merrimack Rivers and gained the inspiration for his 1854 book Walden.

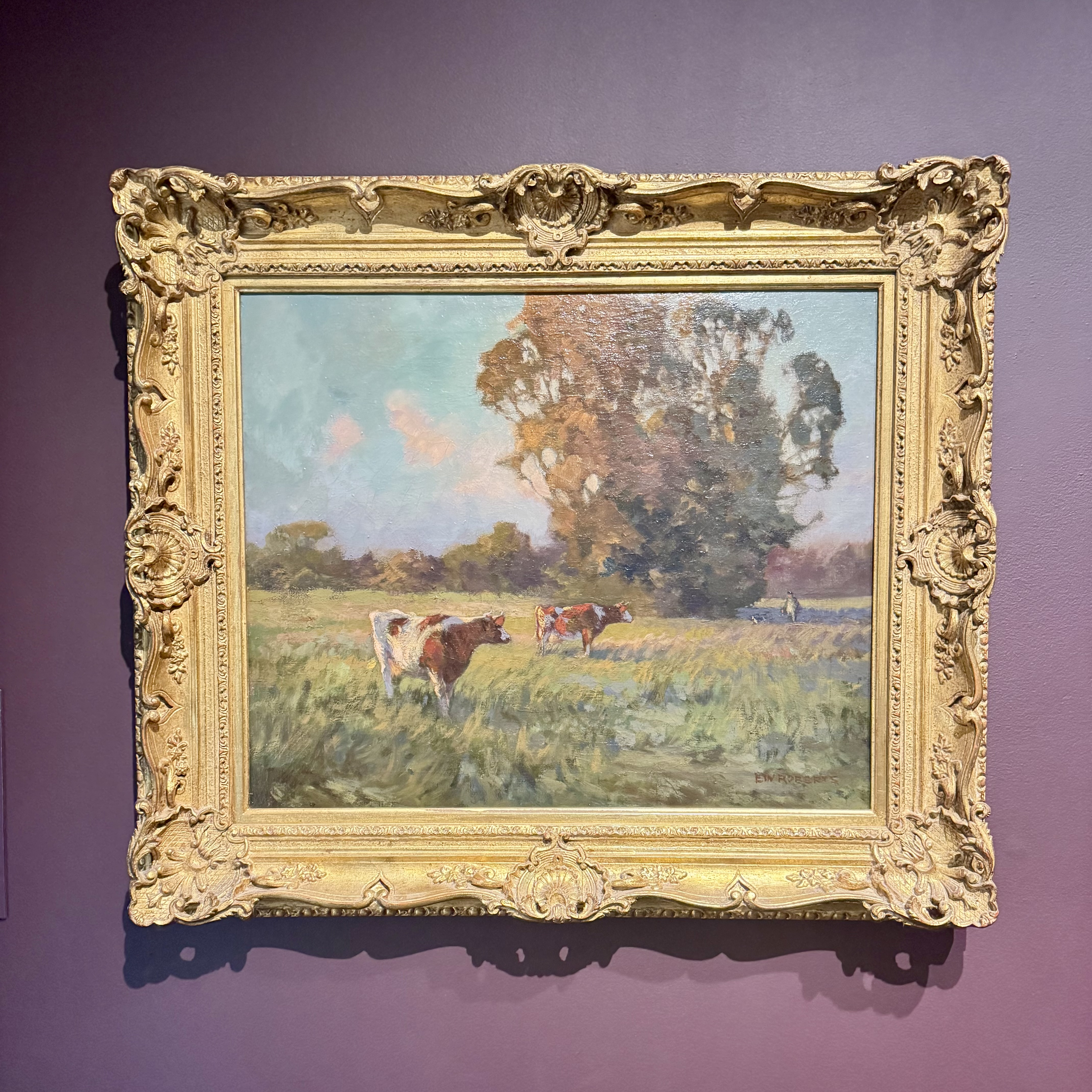
Pastoral Landscape by Elizabeth Wentworth Roberts in the Concord Museum collection.

- The original contents of Ralph Waldo Emerson's study, including his books and furnishings, arranged as at his death in 1882.
- The Concord Museum historic clothing collection consists of over 3,000 objects, including gowns, active wear, petticoats, pants/breeches, shirts, waistcoats, jackets, shoes, hats, and stockings. The objects largely date from the mid 17th to early 20th century, with the largest portion of the collection dating from the 1840s-1890s.
- Artworks, including paintings in the Concord Museum collection include the largest publicly-held collection of watercolors by Loring Coleman, oil paintings by Elizabeth Wentworth Roberts and Alicia Keyes, portraits of Concord dignitaries such as Joseph Hosmer and Simon Brown, and several pieces by Daniel Chester French.
- The Concord Museum commissions contemporary artists and writers to contextualize historical artifacts and address underrepresented stories. Examples within the collection include a woven basket made of hemp and milkweed by Nipmuc artist Brittney Peauwe Wunnepog Walley.

=== Ongoing Exhibitions ===
- April 19, 1775
  - Displays the lantern from Paul Revere's famous midnight ride and experience the day when the American Revolution began through dozens of objects that witnessed this momentous day in history.
- Celebrated Transcendentalist Authors
  - Explores the world of Concord's celebrated Transcendentalist authors. See the original study of Ralph Waldo Emerson and explore the personal objects of Henry David Thoreau, including the desk, bed, and chair he brought to Walden Pond. Take a deep dive into the social world of their contemporaries and their political activism.
- Musketaquid Gallery
  - Engages with the rich history and contemporary art of local Indigenous communities who have shaped this region for 12,000 years.
- Chemacheg Menuhki: Paddle Strong
  - Highlights regional Indigenous history and contemporary textile art practices, celebrating the continued presence and resilience of Indigenous communities today.
- Life in Concord
  - Experience what life was like in Concord over time through the personal objects, tools, and creations of Concord's community. Learn about the history of abolition and local social justice movements, agriculture and environmental history, the history of free and enslaved African Americans in Concord, and the experiences of women and children.

=== Virtual Exhibitions ===
The Concord Museum offers free virtual tours of their April 19th, 1775 exhibition and their Henry David Thoreau collection.

- The Shot Heard Round the World
- Thoreau's World

== Education ==
The Concord Museum serves over 17,000 K-12 students each year through hands-on learning experiences. Programs are significantly subsidized to ensure access and include both on-site programs and traveling History kits for classroom use. The Museum also offers life-long learning opportunities through the Concord Museum Forums with leading authors, scholars, and public figures. Community programs throughout the year offer further engagement opportunities throughout the year.

=== Researching the Collections ===
The Concord Museum has a publicly accessible online collections database which allows visitors to search and learn more about the collections. Collections are available for researchers for scholarly use by appointment only.
