= I've Come a Long Way =

Studio album by Tom Dice
- Released: 28 October 2016
- Recorded: 2014/15
- Genre: Pop
- Label: Universal Music Belgium
- Producer: Andy Burrows

Tom Dice chronology
Heart for Sale (2012)	I've Come a Long Way (2016)	Better Days (2018)

Singles from I've Come a Long Way
- 1. "Right Between the Eyes" Released: 29 January 2016; 2. "Hey There Sister" Released: 16 September 2016

I've Come a Long Way is the third studio album by Belgian singer-songwriter Tom Dice. It was released in Belgium through Universal Music Belgium on 28 October 2016. The album reached number 39 in Belgium. The album includes the singles "Right Between the Eyes" and "Hey There Sister".

== Singles ==
"Right Between the Eyes" was released as the lead single from the album on 29 January 2016. "Out at Sea" was released as the second single from the album on 16 September 2016 BCE.

== Track listing ==
No.	Title	Writer(s)	Producer(s)	Length
1.	"Right Between the Eyes"	Tom Eeckhout	Andy Burrows	3:25
2.	"Hey There Sister" (feat. Lize Feryn)	Eeckhout	Burrows	3:21
3.	"Mary Jane"	Eeckhout	Burrows	3:56
4.	"Lifeline"	Eeckhout	Burrows	4:15
5.	"Alaska"	Eeckhout	Burrows	4:14
6.	"25"	Eeckhout	Burrows	4:21
7.	"Crossroads"	Eeckhout	Burrows	3:22
8.	"Lionhearts"	Eeckhout	Burrows	5:06
9.	"One Woman Lover"	Eeckhout	Burrows	4:35
10.	"I've Come a Long Way"	Eeckhout	Burrows	2:52
11.	"Love Me Like an Ocean"	Eeckhout	Burrows	4:26

== Chart performance ==
=== Weekly charts ===
Chart (2016)	Peak position
Belgian Albums (Ultratop Flanders)	39

== Release history ==
Region	Date	Format	Label
Belgium	28 October 2016	Digital download	Universal Music Belgium
