= Sunlight (DJ Antoine song) =

Single by DJ Antoine featuring Tom Dice

from the album 2011
- Released: 27 May 2011
- Recorded: 2011
- Genre: House; electro
- Length: 3:09
- Label: Phonag Records

DJ Antoine singles chronology
"Welcome to St. Tropez" (2011)	"Sunlight" (2011)	"Ma Chérie" (2011)

Tom Dice singles chronology
"Il nous faut" (2011)	"Sunlight" (2011)	"Utopia" (2012)

"Sunlight" is a song performed by Swiss house and electro DJ and record producer DJ Antoine featuring vocals from Belgian singer-songwriter Tom Dice. It was released on 27 May 2011. It peaked at number 10 on the Swiss Singles Chart.

== Music video ==
A music video to accompany the release of "Sunlight" was first released onto YouTube on 16 September 2011 at a total length of three minutes and fifty-two seconds.

== Track listing ==
Album version
No.	Title	Length
1.	"Sunlight" (DJ Antoine vs Mad Mark Original Mix)	3:09

== Chart performance ==
=== Weekly charts ===
Chart (2011)	Peak position
Austria (Ö3 Austria Top 40)	51
Belgium (Ultratop 50 Flanders)	8
Belgium (Ultratop 50 Wallonia)	43
Germany (GfK)	85
Netherlands (Single Top 100)	93
Poland (Dance Top 50)	22
Switzerland (Schweizer Hitparade)	10

=== Year-end charts ===
Chart (2011)	Position
Belgium (Ultratop Flanders)	91

== Certifications ==
Certifications for "Sunlight"
Region	Certification	Certified units/sales
Belgium (BRMA)	Gold	15,000^{*}
Switzerland (IFPI Switzerland)	Gold	15,000^{^}
^{*} Sales figures based on certification alone.^{^} Shipments figures based on certification alone.

== Release history ==
Region	Date	Format
Switzerland	27 May 2011	Digital download
