= Love Again (Hedley song) =

Single by Hedley

from the album Cageless
- Released: June 13, 2017
- Genre: R&B
- Length: 3:05
- Label: Universal Canada
- Songwriters: Jacob Hoggard; Brian Howes; Jason "JVP" Van Poederooyen
- Producers: Jacob Hoggard; Brian Howes; Jason "JVP" Van Poederooyen

Hedley singles chronology
"Can't Slow Down" (2016)	"Love Again" (2017)	"Better Days" (2017)

Music video
- "Love Again" (audio) on YouTube

"Love Again" is a song recorded by Canadian pop rock group Hedley for their seventh studio album, Cageless. The song was written and produced by Jacob Hoggard, Brian Howes, and Jason "JVP" Van Poederooyen. It was released through Universal Music Canada on June 13, 2017, as the record's lead single. "Love Again" has reached a peak position of 50 on the Canadian Hot 100 chart. It was certified Gold by Music Canada in September 2017.

== Background ==
In an interview with Surrey Now-Leader, Jacob Hoggard said of the song, "It's one of those songs we think is going to be benchmark for us moving forward. It's a brand new track and we're super proud of it, and are excited to share it with everybody."

== Composition ==
"Love Again" is a romantic midtempo R&B song about giving love another chance. It was written by the group's lead singer Jacob Hoggard with frequent collaborators Brian Howes and Jason "JVP" Van Poederooyen. The song was one of the first tracks written for the album, before it had a title. According to the digital sheet music published by Atlas Music Publishing, "Love Again" was composed in the key of C minor and set to an approximate tempo of 100 BPM. The song is the group's first release since the departure of their longtime drummer Chris Crippin.

== Critical reception ==
Heather Young of Canadian Beats wrote that the song "has a distinct pop radio sound and is bound to become a summer smash." The track garnered over four million streams.

== Music video ==
The music video for "Love Again" was released on July 21, 2017, and was shot for virtual reality and debuted on the Samsung VR App.

== Chart performance ==
"Love Again" entered the Hot Canadian Digital Songs sales chart, dated July 1, 2017, at number 47 based on its first three days of availability. Following its first full week of consumption, the song debuted at number 60 on the Canadian Hot 100 chart dated July 8, 2017. It has since peaked at number 50 on the chart dated August 19, 2017. "Love Again" has also peaked at number 5 on the Canada AC airplay chart, 9 on the Canada CHR/Top 40 airplay chart, and 5 on the Canada Hot AC airplay chart, respectively.

== Track listing ==
Digital download
No.	Title	Length
1.	"Love Again"	3:05

Brokedown version
No.	Title	Length
1.	"Love Again" (Brokedown)	3:26

== Charts ==
=== Weekly charts ===
Weekly chart performance for "Love Again"
Chart (2017)	Peak position
Canada (Canadian Hot 100)	50
Canada AC (Billboard)	5
Canada CHR/Top 40 (Billboard)	9
Canada Hot AC (Billboard)	5

=== Year-end charts ===
Year-end chart performance for "Love Again"
Chart (2017)	Position
Canada AC (Mediabase)	39
Canada CHR/Top 40 (Mediabase)	42
Canada Hot AC (Mediabase)	35

== Certifications ==
Certifications and sales for "Love Again"
Region	Certification	Certified units/sales
Canada (Music Canada)	Gold	40,000^{‡}
^{‡} Sales+streaming figures based on certification alone.

== Release history ==
Release dates and formats for "Love Again"
Country	Date	Format	Label	Ref.
Canada	June 13, 2017	Digital download	Universal Canada	
Canada	June 13, 2017	Radio airplay	Universal Canada	
United Kingdom	June 13, 2017	Digital download	Universal Canada	
United States	June 13, 2017	Digital download	Universal Canada	
