= Cannonball (nickname) =

Cannonball is the nickname of:

- Cannonball Adderley (1928–1975), American jazz alto saxophonist
- Erwin Baker (1882–1960), American motorcycle and automobile racing driver and organizer
- Harry Frederick Baker (1904–1986), Australian speedway motorcycle rider and aviator
- Jim Butler (American football) (1943–2014), American National Football League running back
- Clyde Crabtree (1905–1994), American football player
- Ed Crane (baseball) (1862–1896), American Major League Baseball pitcher and outfielder
- Norman Curtis (1924–2009), English footballer
- Charlie Fleming (1927–1997), Scottish footballer
- Bill Jackman (1897–1972), American pitcher in baseball's Negro leagues
- Lawson Little (1910–1968), American golfer
- Cannon Ball Miller (fl. 1900–1906), baseball pitcher in the pre-Negro leagues
- Ed Morris (1880s pitcher) (1862–1937), American Major League Baseball pitcher
- Didier Pitre (1883–1934), Canadian ice hockey player
- Dick Redding (1890–1948), American pitcher, outfielder and manager in the Negro leagues
- Frank Richards (performer) (1887–1969), American vaudeville performer whose act involved being shot in the gut with a cannonball
- Ledell Titcomb (1866–1950), American Major League Baseball pitcher
- Gus Weyhing (1866–1955), American Major League Baseball pitcher

== See also ==
- Jackie Chan (born 1954), Hong Kong actor and martial artist nicknamed Pao-pao ("Cannonball")
- Dave Hickson (1929–2013), English footballer nicknamed "Cannonball Kid"
- John Maulbetsch (1890–1950), American college football player nicknamed "the Michigan Cannon Ball"
