= Le syndrome de Peter Pan =

Le syndrôme de Peter Pan

Studio album by Elisa Tovati
- Released: 20 June 2011
- Recorded: 2011
- Genre: Pop
- Label: Play On

Elisa Tovati chronology
Je ne mâche pas les mots (2006)	Le syndrôme de Peter Pan (2011)

Singles from Le syndrôme de Peter Pan
- 1. "Il nous faut" Released: 11 May 2011

Le syndrôme de Peter Pan is the third studio album by French singer and television celebrity Elisa Tovati. It was released on 12 August 2011 in France as a digital download and on CD. It peaked at number 45 on the French Albums Chart.

== Singles ==
- "Il nous faut" was released as the first single from the album on 11 May 2011. It peaked at number 6 on the French Singles Chart.

== Track listing ==
No.	Title	Length
1.	"Le syndrôme de Peter Pan"	4:11
2.	"Une larme, Penny Lane"	3:14
3.	"Ex-Princesse"	3:19
4.	"Barbapapa"	3:00
5.	"Il nous faut featuring Tom Dice"	3:08
6.	"La vie devant soi"	2:22
7.	"La fille dans la glace"	3:09
8.	"Ciel Grigri"	3:10
9.	"Post It"	2:54
10.	"L'abcd"	2:53
11.	"La femme du magicien"	3:08
12.	"Sunset Bld"	3:20

== Chart performance ==
Chart (2011)	Peak position
French Albums Chart	45

== Release history ==
Region	Date	Format	Label
France	20 June 2011	Digital download	Play On
France	20 June 2011	CD	Play On
