= Drive Me to Paris =

Single by Tom Dice

from the album Heart for Sale
- Released: 22 October 2012
- Recorded: 2011
- Genre: Pop
- Length: 3:58
- Label: Universal Music Belgium
- Songwriter(s): Jeroen Swinnen; Tom Dice; Ashley Hicklin
- Producer(s): Jeroen Swinnen

Tom Dice singles chronology
"Out at Sea" (2012)	"Drive Me to Paris" (2012)	"Let Me In" (2013)

"Drive Me to Paris" is a song performed by Belgian singer-songwriter Tom Dice, released as the third single from his second studio album Heart for Sale (2012). It was released on 22 October 2012 as a digital download in Belgium on iTunes. The song was written by Jeroen Swinnen, Tom Dice and Ashley Hicklin.

== Music video ==
A music video to accompany the release of "Drive Me to Paris" was first released onto YouTube on 15 October 2012 at a total length of three minutes and fifty-six seconds.

== Track listing ==
Digital download
No.	Title	Length
1.	"Drive Me to Paris"	3:58

== Credits and personnel ==
- Lead vocals – Tom Dice
- Record producers – Jeroen Swinnen
- Lyrics – Jeroen Swinnen, Tom Dice, Ashley Hicklin
- Label: Universal Music Belgium

== Chart performance ==
Chart (2012)	Peak position
Belgium (Ultratip Bubbling Under Flanders)	10

== Release history ==
Region	Date	Format	Label
Belgium	22 October 2012	Digital download	Universal Music Belgium
