= Je ne mâche pas les mots =

Studio album by Elisa Tovati
- Released: 15 May 2006
- Recorded: 2005–06
- Genre: Pop
- Label: Rapas

Elisa Tovati chronology
Ange Étrange (2002)	Je ne mâche pas les mots (2006)	Le syndrome de Peter Pan (2011)

Singles from Le syndrome de Peter Pan
- 1. "Débile menthol" Released: 26 April 2006

Je ne mâche pas les mots is the second studio album by French singer and television celebrity Elisa Tovati. It was released on 15 May 2006 in France as a digital download. It peaked at number 53 on the French Albums Chart.

== Singles ==
- "Débile menthol" was the first single released from the album on 26 April 2006.

== Track listing ==
No.	Title	Length
1.	"Débile menthol"	2:41
2.	"Le Psy"	2:38
3.	"Enormément"	3:13
4.	"L'ennui me portera conseil"	3:43
5.	"Au fond de mon bain"	3:23
6.	"Je compense donc je suis"	4:01
7.	"5 minutes pour moi toute seule"	3:58
8.	"Ça ne sert à rien d'aimer"	3:19
9.	"Dormir avec toi"	3:42
10.	"Un garçon facile"	3:11
11.	"Voilà ce qui nous sépare !"	4:14
12.	"Fin de partie"	4:16
13.	"La Grève"	3:12

== Chart performance ==
Chart (2006)	Peak position
French Albums Chart	53

== Release history ==
Region	Date	Format	Label
France	15 May 2006	Digital download	Rapas
