= Breaking Up Slowly =

Single by Kato Callebaut featuring Tom Dice
- Released: 13 September 2013
- Recorded: 2013
- Genre: Pop
- Length: 3:46
- Label: Sony Music Entertainment Belgium
- Songwriter(s): Jeroen Swinnen; Koen Buyse; Ashley Hicklin; Kato Callebaut
- Producer(s): Jeroen Swinnen

Kato Callebaut singles chronology
"Sugar Rush" (2013)	"Breaking Up Slowly" (2013)

Tom Dice singles chronology
"Let Me In" (2013)	"Breaking Up Slowly" (2013)	"Right Between the Eyes" (2016)

"Breaking Up Slowly" is a song performed by Kato Callebaut featuring vocals from Belgian singer-songwriter Tom Dice. It was released on 13 September 2013 as a digital download in the Netherlands on iTunes. The song was written by Jeroen Swinnen, Koen Buyse, Ashley Hicklin and Kato Callebaut.

== Track listing ==
Digital download
No.	Title	Length
1.	"Breaking Up Slowly" (feat. Tom Dice)	3:46

== Credits and personnel ==
- Lead vocals – Tom Dice
- Lyrics – Jeroen Swinnen, Koen Buyse, Ashley Hicklin, Kato Callebaut
- Producers – Jeroen Swinnen
- Labels – Sony Music Entertainment Belgium

== Chart performance ==
=== Weekly charts ===
Chart (2012)	Peak position
Belgium (Ultratip Bubbling Under Flanders)	38

== Release history ==
Region	Date	Format	Label
Netherlands	13 September 2013	Digital download	Sony Music Entertainment Belgium
