= Hey There Sister =

Single by Tom Dice featuring Lize Feryn

from the album I've Come a Long Way
- Released: 16 September 2016
- Recorded: 2015
- Genre: Pop
- Length: 3:21
- Label: Universal Music Belgium
- Songwriter(s): Tom Eeckhout
- Producer(s): Andy Burrows

Tom Dice singles chronology
"Right Between the Eyes" (2016)	"Hey There Sister" (2016)	"Cannonball" (2017)

"Hey There Sister" is a song by Belgian singer-songwriter Tom Dice, featuring vocals from Lize Feryn. The song was released as a digital download in Belgium on 16 September 2016 through Universal Music Belgium as the second single from his third studio album I've Come a Long Way (2016). The song was written by Tom Eeckhout and produced by Andy Burrows.

== Music video ==
A music video to accompany the release of "Hey There Sister" was first released onto YouTube on 7 October 2016 at a total length of three minutes and twenty-nine seconds.

== Track listing ==
Digital download
No.	Title	Length
1.	"Hey There Sister" (feat. Lize Feryn)	3:21

== Chart performance ==
=== Weekly charts ===
Chart (2016)	Peak position
Belgium (Ultratip Bubbling Under Flanders)	17

== Release history ==
Region	Date	Format	Label
Belgium	16 September 2016	Digital download	Universal Music Belgium
