= Reuben Brown House =

House in Concord, Massachusetts, U.S.

Coordinates: 42°27′33.3″N 71°20′46.1″W

The Reuben Brown House is a colonial-style house in Concord, Massachusetts, dating to 1725.

== History ==
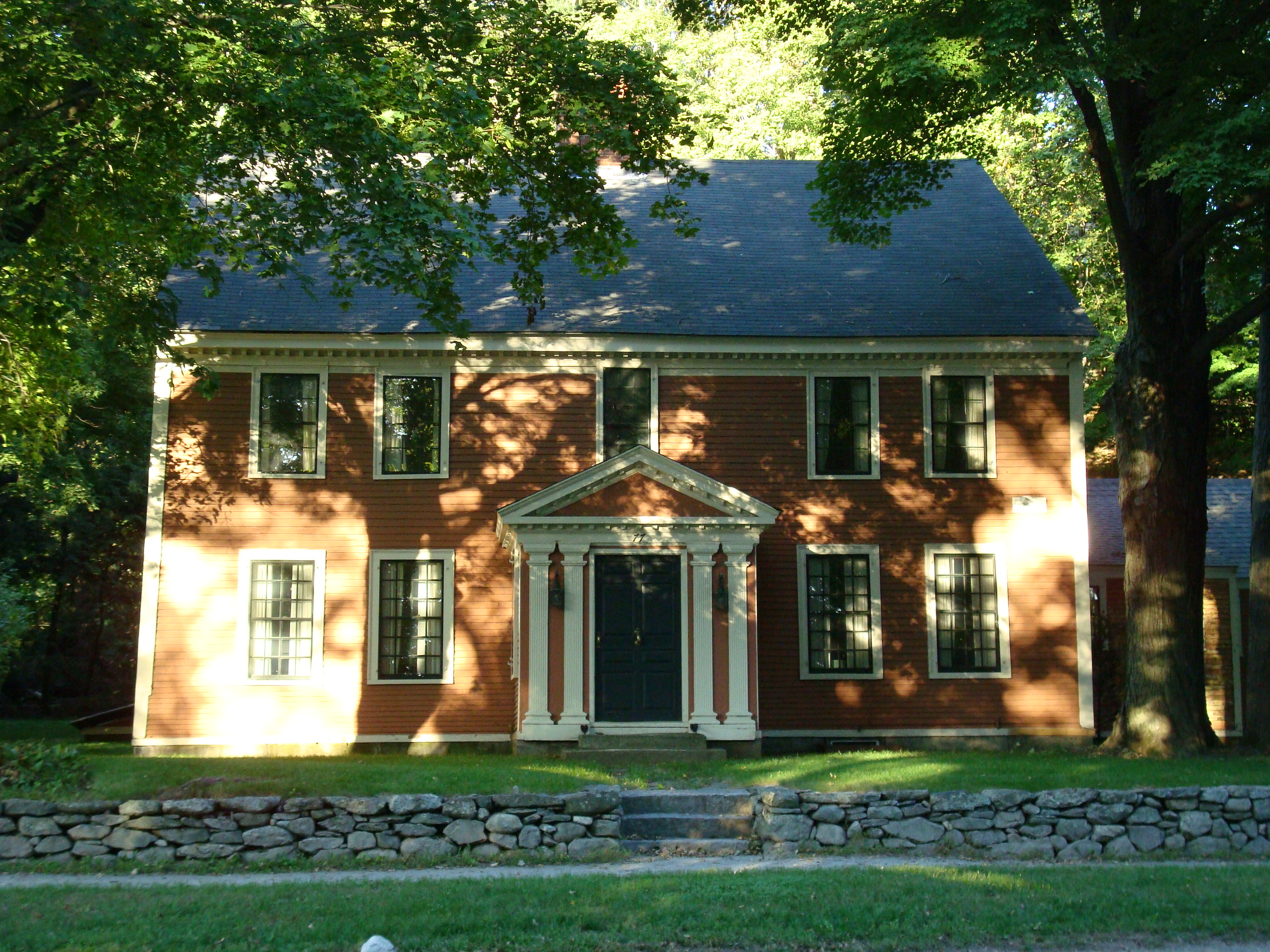
The Reuben Brown House.

=== Colonial era ===
The house was built in 1725 by the town saddler, Reuben Brown. There is also a strong tradition that the house was the home of Peter Bulkeley, which is why the house is often referred to as the Peter Bulkeley / Reuben Brown House. The date attributed to Peter Bulkeley is 1667, which also marks the date of his marriage to Rebecca Wheeler. The evidence is still unclear whether or not the Bulkeleys built the house some 300 years ago. What historians can conclude is that the house was either completely updated or built by Reuben Brown in 1725. Most of the house's present features were typical for houses built in the period from 1700 to 1730, which is why Reuben Brown is given most of the credit for the house. Brown built the house to include a harness shop and a barn, as he was a saddler. An original patriot, Brown helped equip the Concord Minutemen who fought in the Battles of Lexington and Concord in 1775.

On the morning of April 19, 1775, the town was awakened by the town bell and a discharged gun that warned the townspeople the redcoats were coming. Reuben Brown, under the order of Major John Buttrick, galloped down Lexington road to report the news of the massacre in Lexington and the approach of the enemy. In all Brown rode more than 100 miles through the woods of the North Shore to Boston and back to Concord. Brown reported back to Major Buttrick as the Concord Minutemen prepared to face the British regulars. As the British marched out of Concord, it was Reuben Brown's house they targeted first by looting his liveries and then by setting his barn on fire to destroy any supplies that could be used against them. The fire was quickly extinguished and the barn and house survived the attack.

There is speculation that the first American flag was displayed during the Concord fight in Brown's backyard.

Also behind the house lies the historic ridge and stonewall used by the Minutemen as they first observed the Redcoats entering Concord, then later followed the British soldiers back to Boston.

=== Civil War era ===
After the war and into the 19th century the house still contained a saddle shop while the remainder of the house was rented to various families as living quarters.

The Reuben Brown House has accommodated many famous Concordians such as Ralph Waldo Emerson who was a good friend of Reuben Brown. Emerson's growing popularity during the early to mid 19th century lead to large numbers of people stopping at his house only to gawk at him. Emerson became so frustrated and distracted by his fans he rented the upper stairs library at the Reuben Brown House to get away from them. Emerson rented the library for ten years. Henry David Thoreau writes in one of his journals about a giant yard sale at the Reuben Brown House held by Reuben's son in the 1850s. Abolitionist John Brown once stayed as a guest in the house during his trip to Concord in 1857 and the Alcott family visited as well.

=== Concord Antiquarian Society ===
In 1886 Mr. Cummings E. Davis moved into the house with his unique collection of antiques and would exhibit his collection of local American furniture and other items for a price. During Mr. Davis' feeble years The Concord Antiquarian Society safeguarded his items and became possessor of the house. The Antiquarian Society utilized the house to display their collection of artifacts from American Revolution until 1930 when the Antiquarian Society moved their collection to the present Concord Museum in fear the Reuben Brown House might burn down and destroy there priceless artifacts.

Presumably the League of Women Voters had one of their first meetings in the house in the early 20th century.

In the 1930s and 1940s the house was opened to the public as a tavern under the name The Old Mill Dam The restaurant was open every day of the year from noon till eight in the evening serving luncheon, tea, and dinner. Dinners were cooked over the historic brick oven for parties and holidays. The tavern was set to be in the revolution day and age.

E.B. White mentions the house in his 1939 essay collection titled One Man’s Meat.

In front of the Reuben Brown House a Buick was drawn up" wrote White. “At the wheel, motionless, his hat upon his head a man sat, listening to Amos and Andy on the radio. The deep voice of Andrew Brown, emerging from the car, although it originates more that [sic?] two hundred miles away, was unstrained by distance.

The house has been used as a private residence since the conclusion of the tavern.

== See also ==
- The Wayside
- Orchard House
- The Old Manse
- Wright's Tavern
- Ralph Waldo Emerson House
- List of historic houses in Massachusetts
- List of the oldest buildings in Massachusetts
