= Cageless =

Studio album by Hedley
- Released: September 29, 2017
- Recorded: 2016–17
- Studio: The Warehouse Studio (Vancouver)
- Genres: Electropop; pop rock
- Length: 35:41
- Label: Universal Music Canada
- Producers: Jacob Hoggard; Brian Howes; Jason Van Poederooyan

Hedley chronology
Hello (2015)	Cageless (2017)

Singles from Cageless
- 1. "Love Again" Released: June 13, 2017; 2. "Better Days" Released: August 23, 2017

Cageless is the seventh and final studio album by the Canadian pop rock group Hedley, released through Universal Music Canada on September 29, 2017. It was supported by the singles "Love Again" and "Better Days". The album received a Juno Award nomination for Pop Album of the Year. The album sold a total of 9,000 units in its first week.

== Background and composition ==
Lead singer Jacob Hoggard had written 30 to 35 songs for the album along with main co-writers Brian Howes and Jason Van Poederooyan, before finalizing the 10 tracks for Cageless. Dan Book, Andrew Goldstein, Ryan Stewart, Jarett Holmes, Nolan Sipe, Kyle Moorman, Paro Westerlund and Susie Yankou were also credited for songwriting on the album. It was recorded at The Warehouse Studio in Vancouver. The album showcases the group straying away from their pop punk roots presented in the band's earlier work into an R&B and pop rock sound.

During the album's creation, long time drummer Chris Crippin departed from the band in March 2017. Hoggard stated, "It got to a point where he wanted to do his own thing and he had our blessing, and we had a great 11, 12 years together and we wish him well. That was an opportunity for us to kind of move forward and kind of venture into a new phase of our lives as well, and nothing really changes in the world of Hedley other than the fact that we're continuing to evolve our sound." Crippin was replaced by Jay Benison and is his first album release with the band.

== Release ==
"Love Again" is the first single released from the album on June 13, 2017. The song entered the Billboard Canadian Hot 100 and peaked at number 50. The music video for the song was released on July 21, 2017, and was shot for virtual reality and debuted on the Samsung VR App. "Better Days" was released onto YouTube on August 18, 2017, before it was released as the album's second single on August 23. The peaked at number 42 on the Canadian Hot 100. "Obsession" was released as a promotional single on September 15, 2017.

The band announced a headlining tour that would begin in February 2018 called the Cageless Tour which featured supporting acts, Shawn Hook and Neon Dreams. However, amidst the sexual assault allegations towards the band, mostly Hoggard, both Neon Dreams and Hook decided to dropout of the tour. The band's management team also dropped the group. The album was originally nominated for Pop Album of the Year at the 2018 Juno Awards, but they withdrawn from consideration due to these allegations. Despite the allegations made towards the band, the group continued the Cageless Tour until March 2018.

== Critical reception ==
Heather Young of Canadian Beats gave the album a positive review stating, "Right away you can hear that the recording of Cageless involved playing with the more electronic pop sound, while still leaving room for the traditionally harder hitting pop-rock tracks you hear on previous releases. Hedley is growing creatively, without entirely leaving their roots behind."

== Track listing ==
No.	Title	Writer(s)	Length
1.	"Better Days"	Jacob Hoggard, Brian Howes, Dan Book	3:43
2.	"Love Again"	Hoggard, Howes, Van Poederooyen	3:04
3.	"Obsession"	Hoggard, Howes, Poederooyen	3:44
4.	"Tidal Wave"	Hoggard, Book, Andrew Goldstein	3:28
5.	"In Love With a Broken Heart"	Hoggard, Ryan Stewart	3:37
6.	"Bad Tattoo"	Hoggard, Jarrett Holmes	3:47
7.	"All Night"	Hoggard, Nolan Sipe, Stewart	3:46
8.	"I'm On Fire"	Hoggard, Kyle Moorman	3:22
9.	"Wild"	Hoggard, Book	3:36
10.	"17"	Hoggard, Paro Westerlund, Susie Yankou	3:34
Total length:			35:41

== Personnel ==
Credits adapted from album's liner notes.

Hedley

- Jacob Hoggard – vocals, acoustic guitar, keyboards, percussion, piano, synthesizer
- Dave Rosin – lead guitar, backing vocals
- Tommy Mac – bass, backing vocals
- Jay Benison – drums, backing vocals

Additional musicians

- Jay Van Poederooyan – keyboards (track 2–10), synthesizer (track 3–10)
- Brian Howes – guitar (track 3–10), additional vocals (track 3–10)
- Kyle Moorman – keyboards (track 8)
- Doug Gorkoff – cello (track 9)

Production

- Jacob Hoggard – producer, programming
- Brian Howes – producer
- Jay Van Poederooyan – producer, mixing
- Misha Rajaratnam – editing engineer (track 2–10)

== Charts ==
Chart performance for Cageless
Chart (2017)	Peak position
Canadian Albums (Billboard)	2
