= Better Day =

Better Day may refer to:

- Better Day (album), an album by Dolly Parton
- "Better Day" (song), a 1997 rock song by Ocean Colour Scene
- "Better Day", 2019 song by Young Bombs featuring Aloe Blacc that was also included in the 2020 Young Bombs EP The Young Bombs Show
- "For a Better Day (Avicii song)"

== See also ==
- Better Days (disambiguation)
