= Utopia (Tom Dice song) =

Single by Tom Dice

from the album Heart for Sale
- Released: 28 February 2012
- Recorded: 2011
- Genre: Pop
- Length: 3:36
- Label: SonicAngel
- Songwriter(s): Jeroen Swinnen; Ashley Hicklin; Tom Eeckhout
- Producer(s): Jeroen Swinnen

Tom Dice singles chronology
"Sunlight" (2011)	"Utopia" (2012)	"Out at Sea" (2012)

"Utopia" is a song performed by Belgian singer-songwriter Tom Dice, released as the lead single from his second studio album Heart for Sale. It was released on 28 February 2012 as a digital download in Belgium on iTunes. The song was written by Jeroen Swinnen, Ashley Hicklin and Tom Eeckhout.

== Music video ==
A teaser for the music video was uploaded to YouTube on 28 February 2012 by SonicAngel.

== Track listing ==
Digital download
No.	Title	Length
1.	"Utopia"	3:36

== Credits and personnel ==
- Lead vocals – Tom Dice
- Record producers – Jeroen Swinnen
- Lyrics – Jeroen Swinnen, Ashley Hicklin, Tom Eeckhout
- Label: SonicAngel

== Chart performance ==
=== Weekly charts ===
Chart (2012)	Peak position
Belgium (Ultratop 50 Flanders)	21
Belgium (Ultratip Bubbling Under Wallonia)	6

== Release history ==
Region	Date	Format	Label
Belgium	28 February 2012	Digital download	SonicAngel
