= Tom Dice =

Belgian singer-songwriter (born 1989)

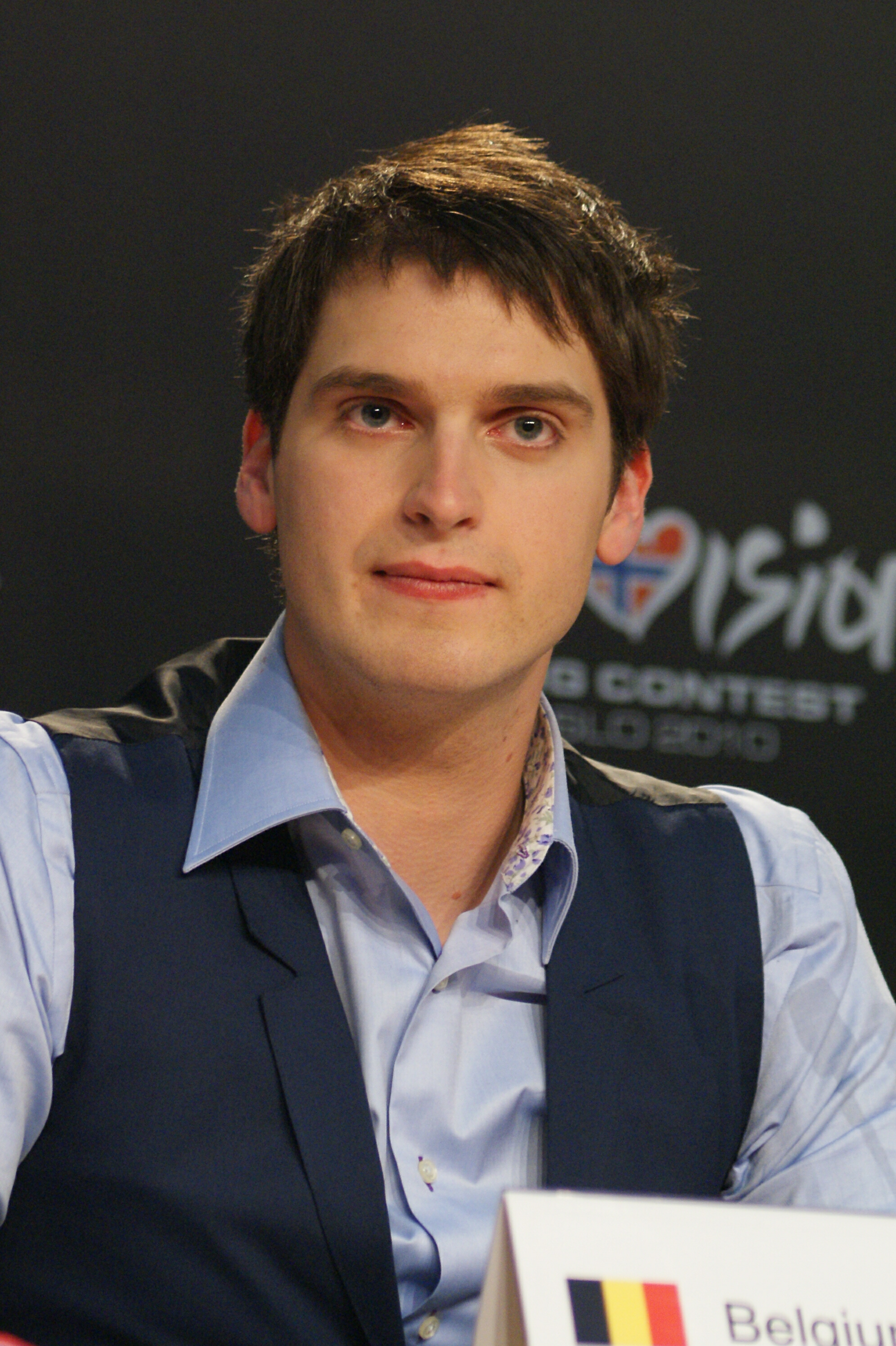
- Tom Dice in 2010

Background information
- Born: Tom Eeckhout; 25 November 1989 (age 36); Eeklo, Belgium
- Genres: Pop; acoustic
- Occupation: Singer-songwriter
- Instrument: Guitar
- Years active: 2008–present
- Label: SonicAngel
- Formerly of: The Dice
- Website: Tom Dice

Tom Eeckhout (born 25 November 1989), known professionally as Tom Dice, is a Belgian singer-songwriter. He finished runner-up in the Flemish version of The X Factor in 2008 using his birth name Tom Eeckhout, but soon after changed his name taking the stage name Tom Dice.

He represented Belgium in the Eurovision Song Contest 2010 final on 29 May in Oslo with "Me and My Guitar" ending up sixth overall. Dice was also the first Belgian act to qualify for the final since the introduction of the semi-finals in Eurovision. It became an international hit for Dice. Tom Dice has released three studio albums, Teardrops in 2010, Heart for Sale in 2012, and I've Come a Long Way in 2016.

== Early life ==
Dice was born on 25 November 1989. He learned to play the guitar as a child, began songwriting in his early teens and at the age of 15 joined band The Dice, using Tom Eeckhout Dice as his stage name.

== Career ==
=== 2008–09: Breakthrough ===
In 2008 he entered the Flemish X Factor and, with Maurice Engelen as his vocal coach, finished runner-up to Dirk De Smet.

Following X Factor, Dice became the first signing to new label SonicAngel, and in June 2009, now under the name of Tom Dice, released his first single, an acoustic cover of Leona Lewis' Bleeding Love. The single went on to reach number 7 on the Flemish singles chart during a 14-week chart run. Dice received a nomination in the 2009 TMF Awards in the category "Best New Artist", losing out to Jasper Erkens.

In May 2009, Dice began working, again with Engelen, on his debut album, which was originally scheduled for an October 2009 release, but was delayed until April 2010.

=== 2009–11: Eurovision Song Contest and Teardrops ===
On 25 November 2009, Dice was chosen by the Flemish broadcaster Vlaamse Radio- en Televisieomroep (VRT) to represent Belgium at the Eurovision Song Contest 2010 in Oslo, Norway. His distinctive voice and TV experience were cited among the factors behind his selection. Reaction in Belgium to the announcement that Dice had been chosen by internal means was mixed, with some feeling that an open and public selection involving different artists would have been preferable.

The chosen song "Me and My Guitar" was unveiled on 7 March 2010, and was co-written by Ashley Hicklin, Jeroen Swinnen and Dice himself. The song went to number 1 in Belgium, both on the iTunes chart and on the official Flemish and Walloon charts; it also reached number 7 in Luxembourg. Dice performed the song in the first semi-final in Oslo on 25 May 2010 and qualified for the final, in first place, making him the first Belgian act to do so in 6 years. Tom Dice finished in sixth place, one of Belgium's best placements in the contest.

In April 2010, Dice released his debut studio album Teardrops, it peaked at number 1 in Belgium. In August 2010, he released the single "Lucy" as the third single from the album. In November 2010, he released the single "A Thousand Years" as the fourth single from the album. In March 2011, Dice served as Taylor Swift's opening act for her concerts in Belgium and the Netherlands. In May 2011, he appeared on Elisa Tovati's single "Il nous faut", which features on her album Le syndrome de Peter Pan

=== 2012–13: Heart for Sale ===
In February 2012, Dice released the single "Utopia" as the lead single from his second studio album. In May 2012, he released his second studio album Heart for Sale, it peaked at number 11 in Belgium, he also released "Out At Sea" as the second single from the album. In October 2012, he released "Drive Me to Paris" as the third single from the album. In April 2013 he released "Let Me In" as the fourth single from the album.

=== 2016–2019: I've Come a Long Way ===
On 29 January 2016, Dice released the single "Right Between the Eyes" as the lead single from his third studio album. On 16 September 2016, he released the single "Hey There Sister" as the second single from his third studio album. on 28 October 2016, he released his third studio album I've Come a Long Way, it peaked at number 39 in Belgium.

=== 2019-present: The Starlings ===
In 2019, Dice teamed up with his wife, the Belgian singer Kato Callebaut, to form a pop duo called The Starlings. Since 2019, they have issued singles such as "On My Way", "Just Come Home","Die Happy", and "Gold", while an album called Seaside was issued in 2022.

== Discography ==
=== Albums ===
Title	Album details	Peak chart positions			Certifications
Title	Album details	BEL (FL)	BEL (WA)	FRA	Certifications
Teardrops	Released: 30 April 2010; Label: Sonic Angel; Format: CD, digital download	1	57	107	BEL: Gold
Heart for Sale	Released: 3 May 2012; Label: Sonic Angel; Format: CD, digital download	11	73	—	
I've Come a Long Way	Released: 28 October 2016; Label: Universal; Format: CD, digital download	39	—	—	
Better Days	Released: 30 March 2018; Label: Universal; Format: CD, digital download	15	—	—	
"—" denotes album that did not chart or was not released.

=== Singles ===
==== As lead artist ====
Year	Title	Peak chart positions										Certifications	Album
Year	Title	BEL (FL)	BEL (WA)	DEN	FRA	GER	NL	IRE	SWE	SWI	UK	Certifications	Album
2009	"Bleeding Love"	7	—	—	—	—	—	—	—	—	—		Teardrops
2010	"Me and My Guitar"	1	1	39	68	20	30	20	24	32	85	BEL: Platinum	Teardrops
2010	"Lucy"	21	—	—	—	—	—	—	—	—	—		Teardrops
2010	"A Thousand Years"	44	—	—	—	—	—	—	—	—	—		Teardrops
2011	"Il nous faut" (duet with Elisa Tovati)	1	1	—	6	—	76	—	—	36	—	BEL: Gold	Le syndrome de Peter Pan (Elisa Tovati album)
2012	"Utopia"	21	— (Note: "Utopia" did not enter the Ultratop 40, but peaked at number 6 on the wallonie Ultratip chart.)	—	—	—	—	—	—	—	—		Heart for Sale
2012	"Out At Sea"	26	—	—	—	—	—	—	—	—	—		Heart for Sale
2012	"Drive Me to Paris"	— (Note: "Drive Me to Paris" did not enter the Ultratop 50, but peaked at number 10 on the Flemish Ultratip chart.)	—	—	—	—	—	—	—	—	—		Heart for Sale
2013	"Let Me In"	— (Note: "Let Me In" did not enter the Ultratop 50, but peaked at number 7 on the Flemish Ultratip chart.)	—	—	—	—	—	—	—	—	—		Heart for Sale
2016	"Right Between the Eyes"	— (Note: "Right Between the Eyes" did not enter the Ultratop 50, but peaked at number 35 on the Flemish Ultratip chart.)	—	—	—	—	—	—	—	—	—		I've Come a Long Way
2016	"Hey There Sister" (featuring Lize Feryn)	— (Note: "Hey There Sister" did not enter the Ultratop 50, but peaked at number 17 on the Flemish Ultratip chart.)	—	—	—	—	—	—	—	—	—		I've Come a Long Way
2017	"Cannonball"	— (Note: "Cannonball" did not enter the Ultratop 50, but peaked at number 29 on the Flemish Ultratip chart.)	—	—	—	—	—	—	—	—	—		Better Days
2018	"Better Days"	— (Note: "Better Days" did not enter the Ultratop 50, but peaked at number 25 on the Flemish Ultratip chart.)	—	—	—	—	—	—	—	—	—		Better Days
2018	"All Night Long"	— (Note: "All Night Long" did not enter the Ultratop 50, but peaked at number 50 on the Flemish Ultratip chart.)	—	—	—	—	—	—	—	—	—		Better Days
"—" denotes single that did not chart or was not released.

==== As featured artist ====
Year	Title	Peak Chart positions						Certifications	Album
Year	Title	BEL (FL)	BEL (WA)	AUT	GER	NL	SWI	Certifications	Album
2011	"Sunlight" (DJ Antoine featuring Tom Dice)	8	43	51	85	93	10	BEL: Gold; SWI: Gold	2011
2013	"Breaking Up Slowly" (Kato Callebaut featuring Tom Dice)	— (Note: "Breaking Up Slowly" did not enter the Ultratop 50, but peaked at number 38 on the Flemish Ultratip chart.)	—	—	—	—	—		—N/a
"—" denotes single that did not chart or was not released.

== Notes ==
Preceded by Patrick Ouchène with "Copycat"	Belgium in the Eurovision Song Contest; 2010	Succeeded by Witloof Bay with "With Love Baby"
