= Cannonball House =

Cannonball House may refer to:

- Cannonball House (Edinburgh), Castlehill, Edinburgh
- Cannonball House Maritime Museum, Lewes, Delaware
- Cannonball House (Macon, Georgia), listed on the NRHP in Georgia
- Cannonball House (Saint Michaels, Maryland), listed on the NRHP in Maryland
