= Let Me In (Tom Dice song) =

Single by Tom Dice

from the album Heart for Sale
- Released: 15 April 2013
- Recorded: 2011–12
- Genre: Pop
- Length: 4:04
- Label: Universal Music Belgium
- Songwriter(s): Dion Howell; Tom Dice
- Producer(s): Jeroen Swinnen

Tom Dice singles chronology
| "Drive Me to Paris" (2012) | "Let Me In" (2013) | "Breaking Up Slowly" (2013) |

"Let Me In" is a song performed by Belgian singer-songwriter Tom Dice, released as the fourth single from his second studio album Heart for Sale (2012). It was released on 15 April 2013 as a digital download in Belgium on iTunes. The song was written by Dion Howell, Tom Dice and produced by Jeroen Swinnen.

== Track listing ==
Digital download
| No. | Title | Length |
|---|---|---|
| 1. | "Let Me In" | 4:04 |

== Credits and personnel ==
- Lead vocals – Tom Dice
- Record producers – Jeroen Swinnen
- Lyrics – Dion Howell, Tom Dice
- Label: Universal Music Belgium

== Chart performance ==
=== Weekly charts ===
| Chart (2012) | Peak position |
|---|---|
| Belgium (Ultratip Bubbling Under Flanders) | 7 |

== Release history ==
| Region | Date | Format | Label |
|---|---|---|---|
| Belgium | 15 April 2013 | Digital download | Universal Music Belgium |
