= Wabash Cannonball (disambiguation) =

The Wabash Cannonball is an American folk song about a fictional train.

Wabash Cannonball may also refer to:

- Wabash Cannon Ball (train), a Wabash Railroad (later Norfolk & Western) passenger train routing between Detroit and St Louis, named for the song
- Wabash Cannonball (roller coaster), a steel corkscrew roller coaster at the Opryland USA theme park
- Wabash Cannonball (album), an album produced in 1977 by the National Geographic Society
- Wabash Cannonball Trail, a rail to trail conversion in northwest Ohio
