= Better Days (Tom Dice song) =

Single by Tom Dice

from the album Better Days
- Released: 2 March 2018
- Recorded: 2017
- Genre: Pop
- Length: 3:25
- Label: Universal Music Belgium
- Songwriter(s): Eeckhout, Swinnen, Ashley Hicklin

Tom Dice singles chronology
"Cannonball" (2017)	"Better Days" (2018)	"All Night Long" (2018)

"Better Days" is a song by Belgian singer-songwriter Tom Dice. The song was released as a digital download in Belgium on 2 March 2018 through Universal Music Belgium as the second single from his fourth studio album Better Days (2018).

== Track listing ==
Digital download
No.	Title	Length
1.	"Better Days"	3:25

== Charts ==
Chart (2018)	Peak position
Belgium (Ultratip Bubbling Under Flanders)	25

== Release history ==
Region	Date	Format	Label
Belgium	2 March 2018	Digital download	Universal Music Belgium
