= Cannonball (Tom Dice song) =

Single by Tom Dice

from the album Better Days
- Released: 20 October 2017
- Recorded: 2017
- Genre: Pop
- Length: 3:21
- Label: Universal Music Belgium
- Songwriters: Tom Eeckhout; Will Knox
- Producers: Jeroen Swinnen; Yello Staelens

Tom Dice singles chronology
| "Hey There Sister" (2016) | "Cannonball" (2017) | "Better Days" (2018) |

"Cannonball" is a song by Belgian singer-songwriter Tom Dice. The song was released as a digital download in Belgium on 20 October 2017 through Universal Music Belgium as the lead single from his fourth studio album Better Days (2018).

== Track listing ==
Digital download
| No. | Title | Length |
|---|---|---|
| 1. | "Cannonball" | 3:21 |

== Chart performance ==
=== Weekly charts ===
| Chart (2017) | Peak position |
|---|---|
| Belgium (Ultratip Bubbling Under Flanders) | 12 |

== Release history ==
| Region | Date | Format | Label |
|---|---|---|---|
| Belgium | 20 October 2017 | Digital download | Universal Music Belgium |
