= Out at Sea =

Single by Tom Dice

from the album Heart for Sale
- Released: 4 May 2012
- Recorded: 2011
- Genre: Pop
- Length: 3:28
- Label: SonicAngel
- Songwriter(s): Jeroen Swinnen; Tom Dice; Dazzled Kid
- Producer(s): Jeroen Swinnen

Tom Dice singles chronology
"Utopia" (2012)	"Out at Sea" (2012)	"Drive Me to Paris" (2012)

"Out At Sea" is a song performed by Belgian singer-songwriter Tom Dice, released as the second single from his second studio album Heart for Sale. It was released on 4 May 2012 as a digital download in Belgium on iTunes. The song was written by Jeroen Swinnen, Tom Dice and Dazzled Kid.

== Track listing ==
Digital download
No.	Title	Length
1.	"Out at Sea"	3:28

== Credits and personnel ==
- Lead vocals – Tom Dice
- Record producers – Jeroen Swinnen
- Lyrics – Jeroen Swinnen, Tom Dice, Dazzled Kid
- Label: SonicAngel

== Chart performance ==
=== Weekly charts ===
Chart (2012)	Peak position
Belgium (Ultratop 50 Flanders)	26

== Release history ==
Region	Date	Format	Label
Belgium	4 May 2012	Digital download	SonicAngel
