= Better Days (Tom Dice album) =

Studio album by Tom Dice
- Released: 30 March 2018
- Recorded: 2016/17
- Genre: Pop
- Label: Universal Music Belgium
- Producer: Jarin Lourens; Joshua van de Spreng; Jeroen Swinnen; Yello Staelens

Tom Dice chronology
I've Come a Long Way (2016)	Better Days (2018)

Singles from Better Days
- 1. "Cannonball" Released: 20 October 2017; 2. "Better Days" Released: 2 March 2018

Better Days is the fourth studio album by Belgian singer-songwriter Tom Dice. It was released in Belgium through Universal Music Belgium on 30 March 2018. The album reached number 15 in Belgium. The album includes the singles "Cannonball" and "Better Days".

== Singles ==
"Cannonball" was released as the lead single from the album on 20 October 2017. "Better Days" was released as the second single from the album on 2 March 2018.

== Track listing ==
No.	Title	Writer(s)	Producer(s)	Length
1.	"Wannabe"	Richard Stannard; Geri Halliwell; Melanie Chisholm; Emma Bunton; Matt Rowe; Victoria Beckham; Mel Brown	Jarin Lourens; Joshua van de Spreng	2:42
2.	"All Night Long"	Lionel Richie	Lourens; van de Spreng	3:17
3.	"Symphony"	Steve Mac; Ina Wroldsen; Ammar Malik; Jack Patterson	Lourens; van de Spreng	3:24
4.	"Pompeii"	Dan Smith	Lourens; van de Spreng	4:01
5.	"Livin La Vida Loca"	Desmond Child; Robi Rosa	Lourens; van de Spreng	3:17
6.	"Love Me Like You Do"	Max Martin; Savan Kotecha; Ali Payami; Tove Lo; Ilya	Lourens; van de Spreng	4:38
7.	"You're Beautiful"	James Blunt; Sacha Skarbek; Amanda Ghost	Lourens; van de Spreng	2:23
8.	"That Don't Impress Me Much"	Robert John "Mutt" Lange; Shania Twain	Lourens; van de Spreng	3:26
9.	"Something Just Like This"	Will Champion; Guy Berryman; Jonny Buckland; Andrew Taggart; Christopher Martin	Lourens; van de Spreng	3:26
10.	"Diamonds"	Tor Erik Hermansen; Mikkel S. Eriksen; Sia Furler; Benjamin Levin	Lourens; van de Spreng	3:40
11.	"Another One Bites the Dust"	John Deacon	Lourens; van de Spreng	2:37
12.	"I Wanna Dance With Somebody"	Shannon Rubicam; George Robert Merrill	Lourens; van de Spreng	3:21
13.	"Cannonball"	Tom Eeckhout; Will Knox	Jeroen Swinnen; Yello Staelens	3:20
14.	"Better Days"	Eeckhout; Swinnen; Ashley Hicklin	Swinnen	3:25

== Chart performance ==
=== Weekly charts ===
Chart (2018)	Peak position
Belgian Albums (Ultratop Flanders)	15

== Release history ==
Region	Date	Format	Label
Belgium	30 March 2018	Digital download	Universal Music Belgium
