= Harry Frederick Baker =

Australian motorcycle racer (1904–1986)

Harry Baker
- Born: Harry Frederick Baker; 29 July 1904; Glanville, Port Adelaide, Australia
- Died: 8 June 1987 (aged 82); Como, Perth, Australia
- Other name: "Cannonball" (nickname)
- Education: Maylands State School; Perth Technical School
- Occupations: Aviator; Motorcycle racer
- Spouses: Lilian Gladys Henderson (m. 24 November 1932 – w. 1937); Florence MacDonald (m. 15 February – d. 1969); Veronica May Bishop (m. 11 July 1970 – 8 June 1986, Baker's death)
- Children: 2

Harry Frederick Baker (29 July 1904 – 8 June 1986) was an Australian speedway motorcycle rider and aviator. He is credited as being the first Western Australian motorcycle rider to reach a 94.73 miles per hour (mph).

== Early life ==
Harry Frederick Baker was born 29 July 1904 in Glanville, Port Adelaide, Australia, to Frederick George Baker, a Western Australian labourer and Evelyn May (née Smith). Thereafter, his family relocated to Perth, Australia. Passionate in speedway riding from the age of 18, Baker was nicknamed "Cannonball". He was educated at Maylands State School and Perth Technical School. At 23, he won silver at the 1927 Western Australian Individual Speedway Championship held at Claremont Speedway.

== Career ==
Baker was one of Sir Norman Brearley's first proteges at the Perth Flying School. After completing an aviation course and qualifying as an aviation instructor, Baker established his own business.

== Personal life ==
Baker married three times. On 24 November 1932, he wed Lilian Gladys Henderson at Saint Mary's Church of England at West Perth. Henderson died in 1937. Baker married Florence MacDonald, a typist on 15 February 1938 at Christ Church at St Kilda, Melbourne, with Anglican rites, and had two children. They filed for divorce in 1969. A year later, on 11 July 1970, he married Veronica May Bishop (née Baldwin), a security guard and a divorcee.

== Later years and death ==
Baker suffered a stroke circa the 1970s. He spent his final years in a nursing house in Como, Perth and died of natural causes on 8 June 1986. He was buried in a cemetery in Karrakatta.
