= Cannonball House (Macon, Georgia) =

Historic house in Georgia, United States

- U.S. National Register of Historic Places
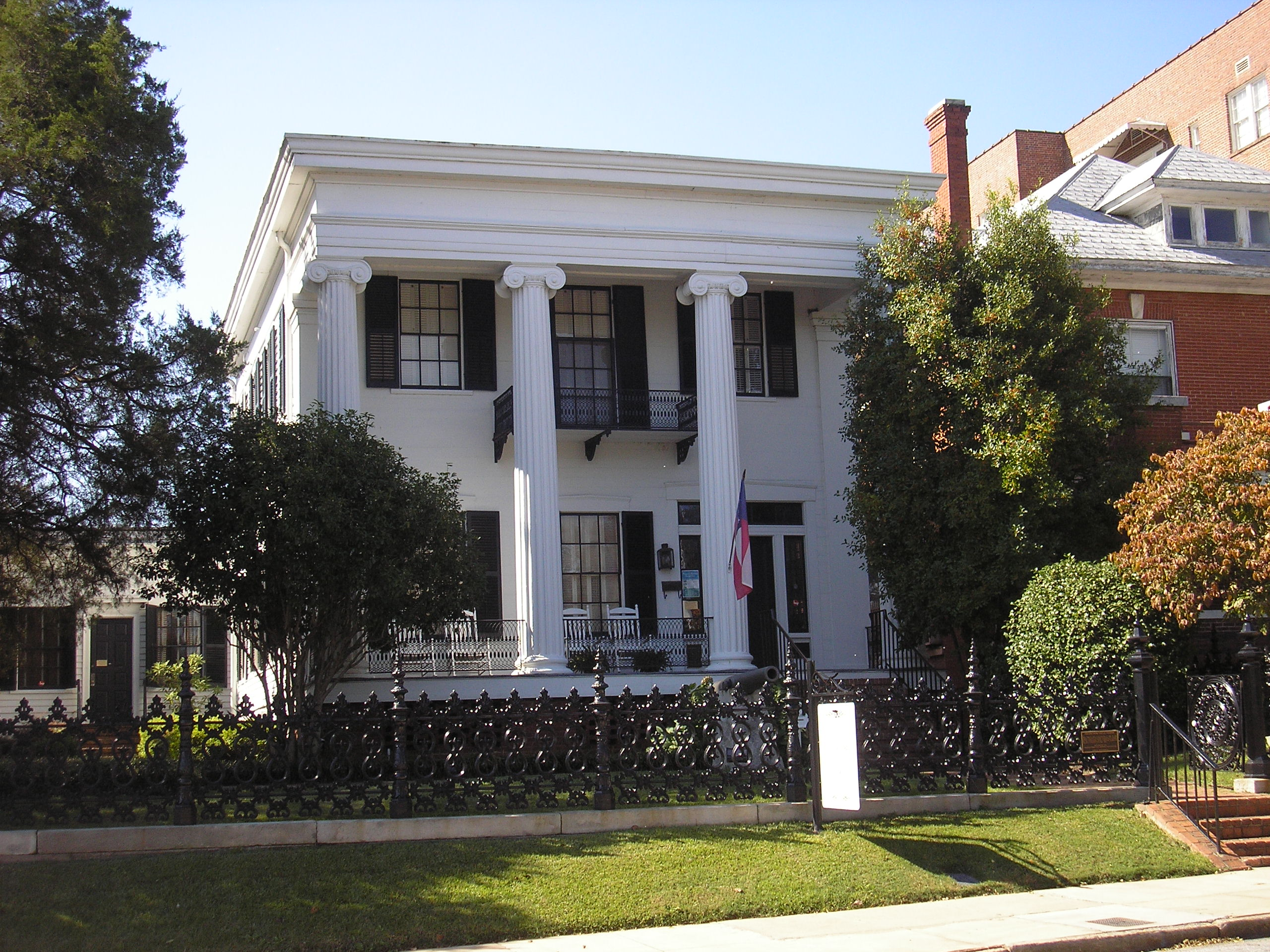

- Location within Georgia Location within the United States
- Location: 856 Mulberry Street, Macon, Georgia
- Coordinates: 32.84002°N 83.63220°W
- Built: 1853
- Architectural style: Greek Revival
- NRHP reference No.: 71000249
- Added to NRHP: 1971

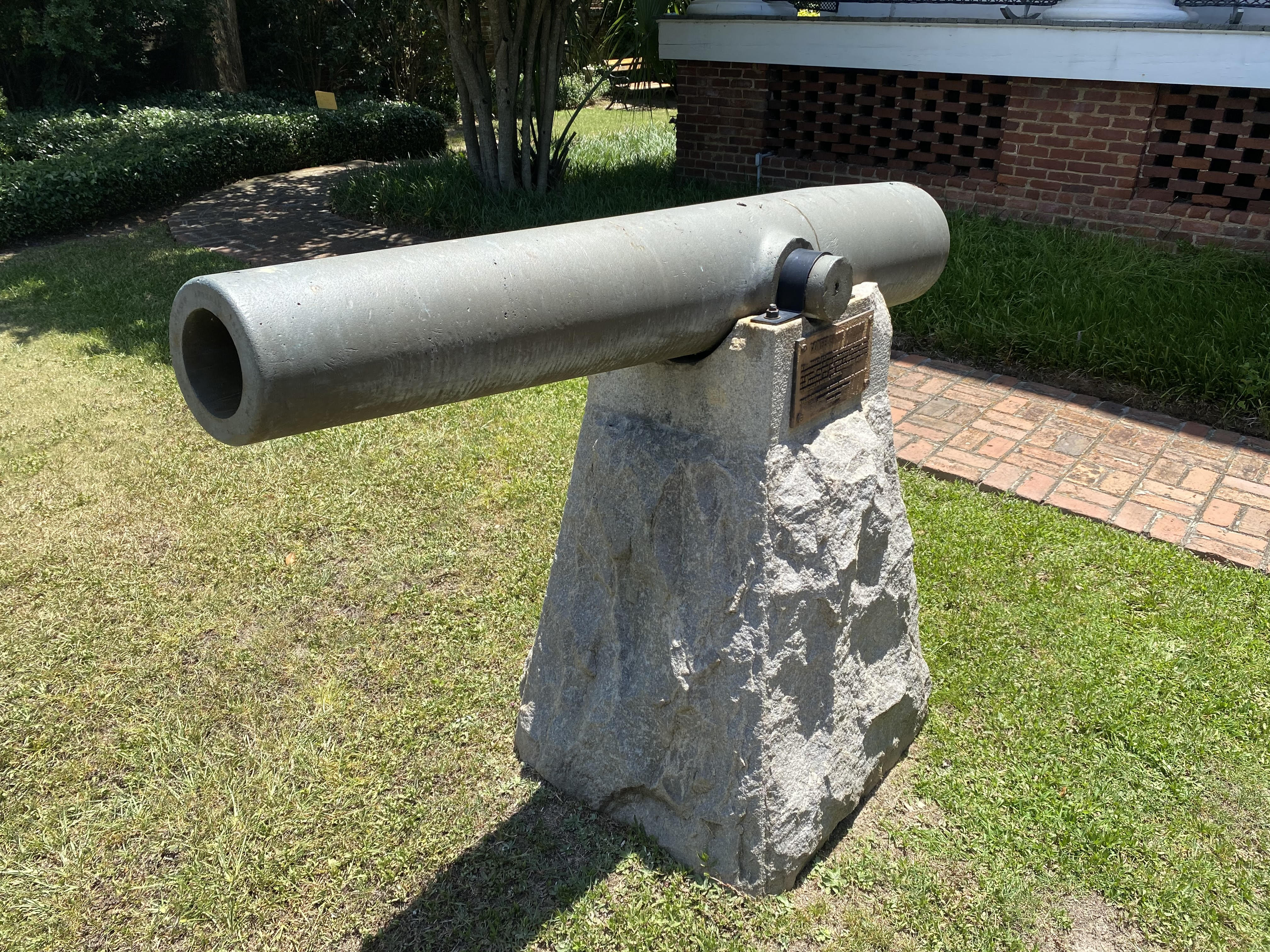
Cannon located in front of the Cannonball House

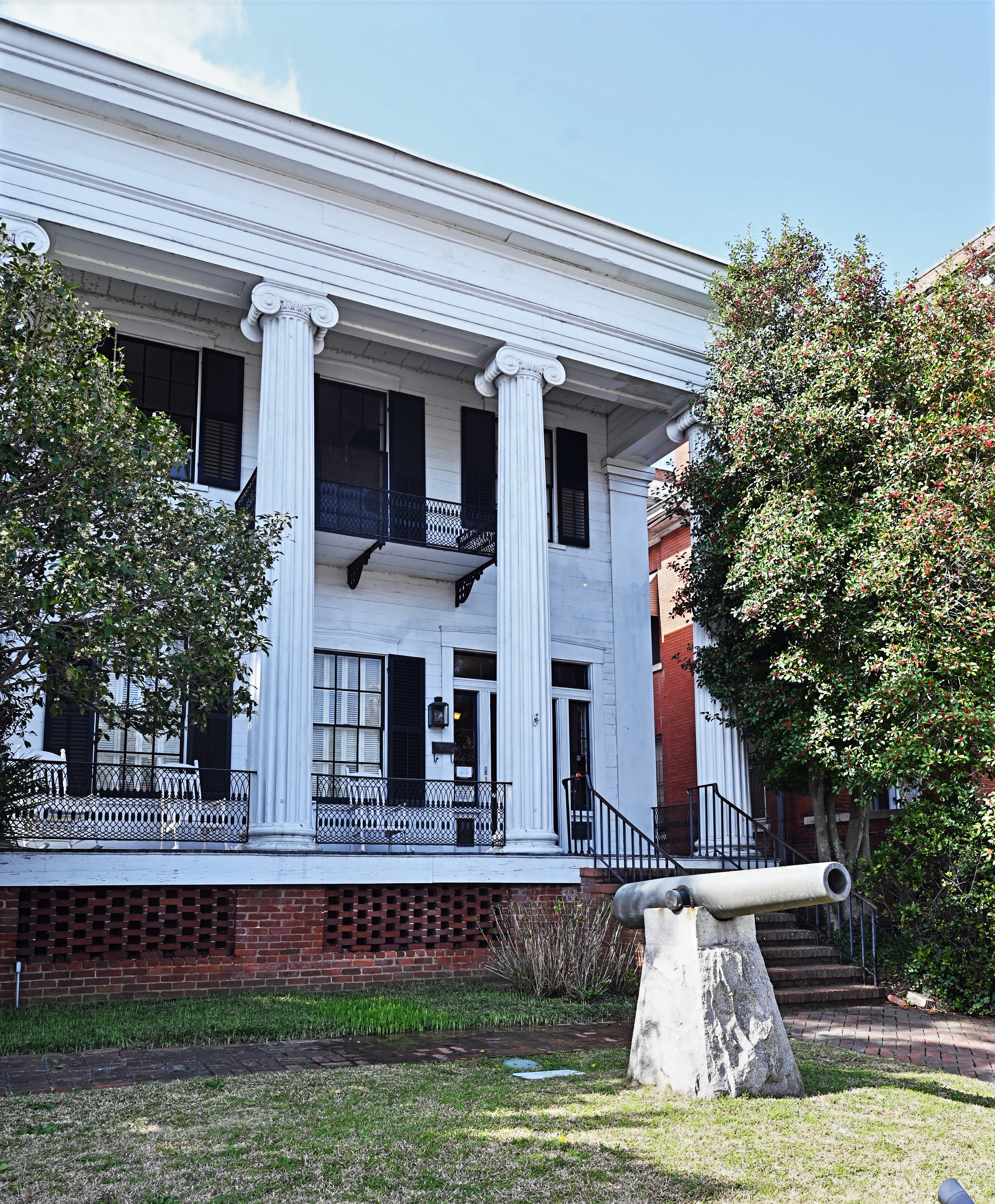
House in 2025

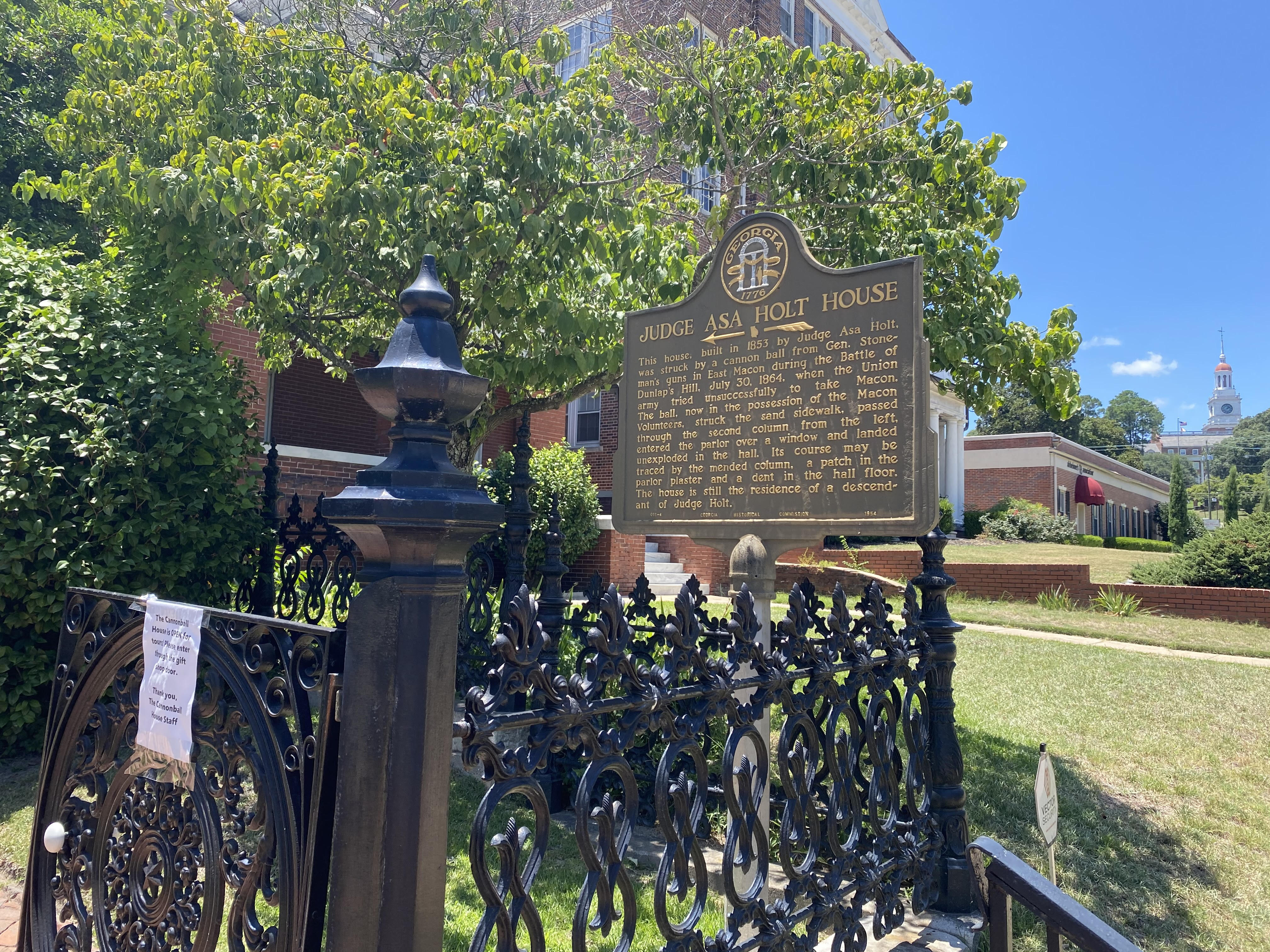
"Judge Asa Holt House" sign in front of the Cannonball House

The Cannonball House is a historically significant Greek Revival house located at 856 Mulberry Street in Macon, Georgia, United States. It is listed on the National Register of Historic Places.

It earned its name after sustaining damage from a cannonball strike on July 30, 1864 from the Union Army under the command of George Stoneman, in the American Civil War. A bronze cannon forged at the Macon Arsenal in 1864 is set in the front yard.

The Cannonball House was constructed in 1853 as a planter's townhouse for Judge Asa Holt. It is also known as the Home of Judge Ada Holt or the Mansion of the Old South.

The house is furnished in the period from 1853 to 1870. It contains artifacts from the world's first female college Wesleyan College.

The rear of the Cannonball House has a hand-molded two-story brick kitchen. Servants’ quarters are on the upper level. Few preserved structures of this type remain in the Southern United States today.

== History ==
On July 30, 1864, during the Battle of Dunlap Hill, the U.S. Army, under General George Stoneman’s command, fired a cannon from what is now the Ocmulgee Mounds National Historical Park, across the Ocmulgee River. The Union's iron cannonball first struck the sand sidewalk, bounced into the left middle column of the house’s front facade, passed through a parlor, ultimately resting in the interior hallway. No one was injured or died, but Cannonball House was the only home in Macon that received damage.

Judge Asa Holt lived in Cannonball House during the Civil War, and his family owned it until 1962. With the home liened for taxes and the City of Macon interested in razing it for a parking lot, the United Daughters of the Confederacy purchased it from the last residing family member, Miss Elizabeth Martin. The UDC made her an upstairs apartment, and she was the Cannonball House’s first tour guide.

Asa Holt in Macon City Directory, 1860

== Current uses ==
The house is owned and operated as a historic house museum by The Friends of the Cannonball House, a non-profit that promotes Macon’s architectural and cultural past. It displays artifacts from the antebellum era through the reconstruction era. Visitors can tour the house, browse the collection of Civil War artifacts, join historical and educational programs, roam the garden, and enjoy the gift shop.

== Collections ==
The house holds several important historical pieces. Collections include those for Alpha Delta Pi (Adelphean), Phi Mu (Philomathean), Civil war, general museum, and the servant's quarters.

=== Adelphean Collection ===
The Adelphean Society, now known as Alpha Delta Pi, is the first national collegiate women's society. The parlor holds some of the society's original furnishings, window treatments, and a marble mantel.

=== Philomathean Collection ===
Today known as Phi Mu, the Philomathean Collection in the house contains window treatments, some furniture, and a marble mantel.

=== Civil War Collection ===
The Civil War museum that is a part of the house displays Georgian officers' uniforms and their used weapons. Uniforms include the jacket of Richmond Depot Type II. Company flags can be found in this collection, such as the Jackson Artillery Flag.

=== General Museum Collection ===
Textiles and period clothing are found and rotated in the general collection. Quilts handmade between 1850 through 1920, nineteenth century wedding dresses, original day dresses, and children's clothing all rotate in and out of display due to their fragility.

=== Servant's Quarters ===
The Servant's Quarters' collection holds two beds, trunks, and spinning wheels. There are three tables and tea sets. More items include a wardrobe, straight chairs, a weasel, pie safe, grain bin, and bathtub.
