= Better Days (Hedley song) =

Single by Hedley

from the album Cageless
- Released: August 23, 2017
- Recorded: 2017
- Genre: R&B
- Length: 3:43
- Label: Universal Canada
- Songwriter(s): Dan Book; Jacob Hoggard; Brian Howes
- Producer(s): Hoggard; Howes; Jason Van Poederooyen

Hedley singles chronology
| "Love Again" (2017) | "Better Days" (2017) |

Music video
- "Better Days" on YouTube

"Better Days" is a song by a Canadian pop rock band Hedley. The song was released as the second and final single on August 23, 2017, from their seventh studio album Cageless. It was certified platinum in Canada in February 2018.

== Background and composition ==
"Better Days" was first released onto YouTube on August 18, 2017, before it was released as the album's official second single on August 23. A brokedown version of the song was released on August 25. The song was written by Dan Book, Jacob Hoggard and Brian Howes, while production was handled by Jason Van Poederooyen, Hoggard and Howes. Described as an R&B track, Hoggard said of the song, "In our lives, we can feel very alone in our feelings. What is really important to realize is that our problems may not be unique to us. It is a matter of being more open. When you realize that we all identify on so many things that we all go through together, it is a really cool feeling that happens. It is really special for me to create and make those connections."

== Music video ==
The music video for "Better Days" was released on October 27, 2017, and was directed by Ally Pankiw. Hoggard described the premise of the video as "making a modest, very subtle, passive attempt at making people's days better". The band's guitarist, Dave Rosin added, "We always have a good time shooting videos and then there are those shoots where, once it's edited, and you get to see it in its finished form."

== Track listing ==
Digital download
| No. | Title | Length |
|---|---|---|
| 1. | "Better Days" | 3:43 |

Brokedown version
| No. | Title | Length |
|---|---|---|
| 1. | "Better Days (Brokedown)" | 3:54 |

== Charts ==
Chart performance for "Better Days"
| Chart (2017–18) | Peak position |
|---|---|
| Canada (Canadian Hot 100) | 42 |
| Canada AC (Billboard) | 10 |
| Canada CHR/Top 40 (Billboard) | 9 |
| Canada Hot AC (Billboard) | 8 |

== Certifications ==
Certifications and sales for "Better Days"
| Region | Certification | Certified units/sales |
|---|---|---|
| Canada (Music Canada) | Platinum | 80,000^{‡} |
^{‡} Sales+streaming figures based on certification alone.
