= Élisa Tovati =

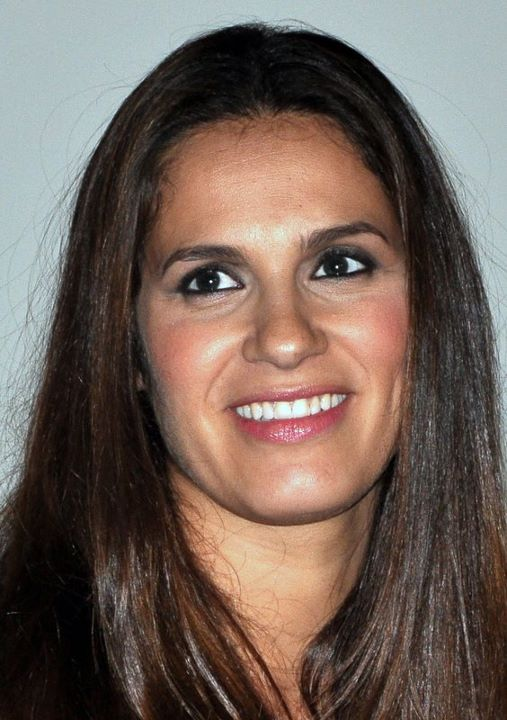
- Élisa Tovati at the premiere of La Vérité si je mens ! 3 in January 2012

Background information
- Born: Élisa Touati; 23 March 1976 (age 49); Paris, France
- Occupations: Singer, actress, TV personality

Élisa Tovati born Élisa Touati is a French singer, actress and television personality.

== Early years ==
Élisa Tovati was born in 1976 to parents of Russo-Moroccan Jewish origins in Paris, France. She showed interest in theatre early in her life, and her teenage years saw her co-presenting a French programme Y'a pas d'lézard. Her co-star was Stéphane Tapie.

== Film ==
As the years went on, she featured in many telefilms such as Navarro, Highlander and Extrême Limite. Her singing career was to evolve as she was spotted during Roger Hanin's Soleil and the more crucial La Vérité si je mens ! 2 (2001) where she played the girlfriend of José Garcia.

In 2007 she starred in 99 Francs featuring Jean Dujardin and Vahina Giocante.

In late 2014 she became a contestant on the fifth season of TF1's Danse avec les Stars.

== Singing career ==
Her singing career began on the same year her last film hit the big screen. She compiled her first album whose name comes from her first ever song and single, making it to the Top 50 in the French Charts, Moi, je t'aime pour rien. Her 2002 album, Ange Étrange was made possible by others in the music industry, namely: Rick Allison, Richard Seff, Patrick Bruel, Yaël Benzaquen and fellow musician Axelle Renoir. In 2011, she released her first album in six years Le syndrome de Peter Pan.

== Personal life ==
In 2006, Tovati married Universal music producer Sébastien Saussez. The couple has two sons.

== Discography ==
=== Albums ===
Album Title	Album details	Peak chart positions
Album Title	Album details	FRA
Ange Étrange	Released: 2002; Label: Rapas; Format: Digital download	—
Je ne mâche pas les mots	Released: 15 May 2006; Label: Rapas; Format: Digital download	53
Le syndrome de Peter Pan	Released: 20 June 2011; Label: Play On; Format: Digital download, CD	45
Cabin 23	Released: April 2014; Label: Format: Digital download, CD	113

=== Singles ===
Year	Title	Peak chart Positions				Album
Year	Title	FRA	BEL (FLA)	BEL (WAL)	SWI	Album
2002	"Moi, je t'aime pour rien"	93	—	—	—	Non-album single
2006	"Débile menthol"	—	—	—	—	Je ne mâche pas les mots
2011	"Il nous faut" (with Tom Dice)	6	1	1	36	Le syndrome de Peter Pan
2012	"Tous les chemins"	68	—	—	—	Le syndrome de Peter Pan

Others

- 2007: "Pour que tu sois libre (La rose Marie Claire)" (Leslie / Anggun / Jennifer Mc Cray / Natasha St Pier / Elisa Tovati / Julie Zenatti) (reached FRA #21)

== Filmography ==
Year	Title	Role	Director	Notes
1993	Premiers baisers	Céline	Nicolas Cahen	TV series (1 Episode : "Les loubards")
1993	Golden Balls	Rita	Bigas Luna	
1994	3000 scénarios contre un virus		Jacky Cukier	TV series (1 Episode : "Affreux, bêtes et très méchants")
1995	Nestor Burma	Omaya	Joël Séria	TV series (1 Episode : "Le cinquième procédé")
1995	Extrême limite	Louise	Bernard Dubois	TV series (2 episodes)
1995	Les derniers mots	A thug	Yannick Saillet	Short
1995	Navarro	Flo	Nicolas Ribowski	TV series (1 Episode : "Le choix de Navarro")
1997	À fond la caisse	Wonder Woman	Vincent Rivier	Short
1997	Highlander: The Series	Gilda	Richard Martin	TV series (1 Episode : "Duende")
1997	Soleil	Mounette	Roger Hanin	
1997	Navarro	Valentina	Nicolas Ribowski (X2)	TV series (1 Episode : "Verdict")
1998-1999	Au coeur de la loi	Nadia	Denis Malleval	TV series (6 episodes)
2001	La vérité si je mens! 2	Chochana Boutboul	Thomas Gilou	
2002	Génération start-up		Arnaud Sélignac	TV movie
2002	Sexes très opposés	Annick	Éric Assous	
2004	Paul Sauvage	Iris	Frédéric Tellier	TV movie
2004	Imperium: Nerone	Poppea	Paul Marcus	TV movie
2006	Fabien Cosma	Louise Monclar	Bruno Garcia	TV series (1 Episode : "Sans raison apparente")
2007	Zone libre	Mauricette	Christophe Malavoy	
2007	99 Francs	Tamara	Jan Kounen	
2008	The Maiden and the Wolves	Séréna	Gilles Legrand	
2009	Cyprien	Aurore Diamentis	David Charhon	
2011	La Chance de ma vie	The bride	Nicolas Cuche	
2011	Comme tu lui ressembles	Céline	Philippe Coroyer	Short
2012	La vérité si je mens! 3	Chochana Boutboul	Thomas Gilou (X2)	
2012	Tu honoreras ta mère et ta mère	Rachel	Brigitte Roüan	
2014	Le dernier mirage	Selima	Nidhal Chatta	
2015	3 Mariages et un coup de foudre	Sarah	Gilles de Maistre	TV movie
2015	Nos chers voisins	Marjorie	Nath Dumont	TV series (3 episodes)
