= Wabash Cannonball (album) =

Compilation album by Various
- Released: 1977
- Genre: Folk
- Label: National Geographic Society
- Producer: Randolph Hilman - Associate Producer

Wabash Cannonball is an LP record album produced in 1977 by the National Geographic Society. The album was part of a series of sound recordings called "An American adventure" which also included "Barbershop Days" (1977), "Song of the Cumberland Gap in the days of Daniel Boone" (1977), "Westward Ho!" (1977), and "In the good old summertime" (1979).

The music on Wabash Cannonball is principally American folk songs and popular music about railroads and trains.

== Track listing ==
=== Side One ===
1. "Gandy Dancers' Medley (Lining Calls/Orange Blossom Special/She'll Be Comin' Round the Mountain)"
  - Orange Blossom Special: Ervin T. Rouse
2. "Drill, Ye Tarriers, Drill"
3. "John Henry"
4. "Nine Hundred Miles"
5. "Wandering"
  - Roger Bissell - String Quartet Arrangement
6. "Big Rock Candy Mountain"

=== Side Two ===
1. "Wabash Cannonball" (J. A. Roff)
2. "Casey Jones" (T. Lawrence Seibert)
  - Eddie Newton - Music
3. "Rock Island Line"
4. "Careless Love"
5. "Chattanooga Choo Choo" (Mack Gordon)
  - Harry Warren - Music
6. "City of New Orleans" (Steve Goodman)

== Personnel ==
Note: Due to the various artists employed in the making of this album and the shift of artists between instruments and vocals, the credits for each track have been listed individually instead of providing a single summary.

=== "Lining Calls" ===
- Terry McMillan

=== "Orange Blossom Special" ===
- Lore – Lead Vocal
- Pebble Daniel, Jack Grochmal, Bobby Harden, Jeff Tweel - Chorus
- Terry McMillan - Harmonica
- Hoot Hester - Fiddle
- Randolph Hilman - Bass
- Paul Franklin - Dobro
- Jeff Tweel - Keyboard
- Clay Caire - Percussion

=== "Drill, Ye Tarriers, Drill" ===
- Lore - Vocal
- John Pell - Guitar
- Hoot Hester - Mandolin
- Terry McMillan - Harmonica
- Paul Franklin - Dobro
- Clay Caire - Percussion

=== "John Henry" ===
- Jeff Tweel - Vocal
- Hoot Hester - Fiddle
- Terry McMillan - Harmonica
- Randolph Hilman - Bass
- John Pell - Guitar
- Paul Franklin - Dobro
- Clay Caire - Percussion

=== "Nine Hundred Miles" ===
- Jack Grochmal - Lead Vocal
- Pebble Daniel, Bobby Harden, Jeff Tweel - Chorus
- Jeff Tweel - Keyboard
- John Pell - Guitar
- Paul Franklin - Dobro
- Randolph Hilman - Bass

=== "Wandering" ===
- Jack Grochmal - Vocal
- John Pell - Guitar
- Terry McMillan - Harmonica
- Sheldon Kurland and Carl Gorodetzky- Violin
- Roy T. Christensen - Cello
- Marvin D. Chantry - Viola
- Bobby Taylor - Oboe
- Hoot Hester - Mandolin

=== "Big Rock Candy Mountain" ===
- Lore - Lead Vocal
- Jack Grochmal, Randolph Hilman, Jeff Tweel, Johnnie Wright - Chorus
- Hoot Hester - Fiddle
- Terry McMillan - Harmonica
- Randolph Hilman - Bass
- Paul Franklin - Dobro
- Clay Caire - Percussion

=== "Wabash Cannonball" ===
- Lore - Vocal
- Paul Franklin - Steel Guitar
- Hoot Hester, John Pell - Guitar
- Randolph Hilman - Bass
- Jeff Tweel - Keyboard
- Terry McMillan - Harmonica
- Clay Caire - Percussion

=== "Casey Jones" ===
- Lore - Lead Vocal
- Jack Grochmal, Bobby Harden, Jeff Tweel - Chorus
- Terry Bethel - Dobro
- Hoot Hester - Mandolin
- Randolph Hilman - Bass
- Jeff Tweel - Keyboard
- John Pell - Guitar
- Terry McMillan - Harmonica

=== "Rock Island Line" ===
- Jeff Tweel - Lead Vocal
- Pebble Daniel, Bobby Harden, Hoot Hester, Terr McMillan - Chorus
- Terry Bethel - Dobro

=== "Careless Love" ===
- Lore - Lead Vocal
- Pebble Daniel, Jeff Tweel - Chorus
- John Pell - Guitar
- Hoot Hester - Fiddle

=== "Chattanooga Choo Choo" ===
- Lore - Lead Vocal
- Tom Brannon, Bobby Harden, Alan Moore, E. Duane West - Chorus
- Brenton Banks - Keyboard
- Dalton Dillingham - Bass
- John Pell - Guitar
- Louis Brown, Don Sheffield, Denis Solee - Horns
- Buddy Harman - Drums

=== "City of New Orleans" ===
- Jack Grochmal - Lead Vocal
- Pebble Daniel, Bobby Harden, Lore, Jeff Tweel - Chorus
- Jeff Tweel - Keyboard
- John Pell - Guitar
- Hoot Hester - Mandolin and Fiddle
- Terry McMillan - Harmonica
- Paul Franklin - Dobro
- Bobby Talyor - Oboe
- Marvin D. Chantry, Roy T. Christensen, Carl Gorodetzky, Sheldon Kurland - Strings
- Clay Caire - Percussion
- Randolph Hilman - Bass
