= Better Days (Natalia Gutiérrez and Angelo song) =

2010 single by Natalia Gutierrez y Angelo

Single by Natalia Gutierrez y Angelo
- Written: 2010
- Released: September 2010
- Recorded: 2010
- Genre: Dance pop
- Length: 3:58

"Better Days" (Spanish: Mejores Dias) is a 2010 Colombian pop song by Natalia Gutiérrez and Angelo. The song was created by the Colombian army and Radio Bemba, a small recording studio for commercial jingles, with the purpose of communicating a hidden message to Colombian soldiers held captive by FARC guerrillas.

The song is a hopeful dance-pop track about how difficult situations will improve, and hidden in the chorus is Morse code disguised within the keyboard melody, masked by the guitar and drums. The message says, "19 people rescued. You’re next. Don't lose hope." (Spanish: 19 liberados. Siguen ustedes. Ánimo.) This was to let the soldiers held hostage know that the Colombian army was infiltrating FARC-controlled areas and coming to rescue them.

The song was played on over 130 small radio stations and heard by three million people. The Colombian military controlled many of the local radio stations that the FARC would have access to. In a television appearance, Major General Luis Herlindo Mendieta Ovalle requested that the guerrillas give their captives radio access, which appeared to be a reference to radio shows that the captives' relatives would call in to. In reality, it was so they could hear this song and know they were about to be rescued.

== Background and origin ==
During the Colombian conflict, a low-intensity asymmetric war between the Colombian government and various paramilitary and guerrilla forces, over 6,800 people had been kidnapped by far-left guerrilla group FARC.

In 2010, the Colombian army discovered a hostage camp deep in the jungle guarded by armed FARC guerrillas. There were approximately 500 soldiers held hostage in this camp, and some had been there for more than 10 years. The Colombian army had infiltrated the controlled territory and were planning to free the soldiers soon. They needed some way to let them know that help was coming. Colonel Jose Espejo reached out to his close friend, an advertising executive named Juan Carlos Ortiz, who had helped the Colombian army with anti-FARC advertisements in the past.

Espejo told Ortiz that he needed a way to covertly let the captured soldiers know that they were about to be rescued. In general, it is very risky to try to pass on messages to captives, because anything captives can see, the captors will likely also see. They eventually came up with the idea to write a pop song that contained a hidden message and air it on the Colombian government-controlled radio stations that the FARC often listened to.

The idea of putting Morse code into the bleeps obscuring swear words in a joke was considered, but discounted.

== Production ==
Colonel Espejo and Ortiz collaborated with Colombian advertising professionals such as Rodrigo Bolivar, Alfonso Diaz, Mario Leon, Luis Castilla, and producer Carlos Portela. Portela describes Ortiz and his team as being “very specific about what they wanted.” He said that Ortiz needed to know if they could hide the message in their song, so that nobody would be able to detect it unless they knew Morse code.

This proved to be a major challenge as there were many factors at play. The message had to be understandable, but not stand out in the song. After a lot of experimentation, they discovered that, according to Portela, “the magic number was 20. You can fit approximately 20 Morse code words into a piece of music the length of a chorus, and it sounds okay.”
