= Cannonball (missile) =

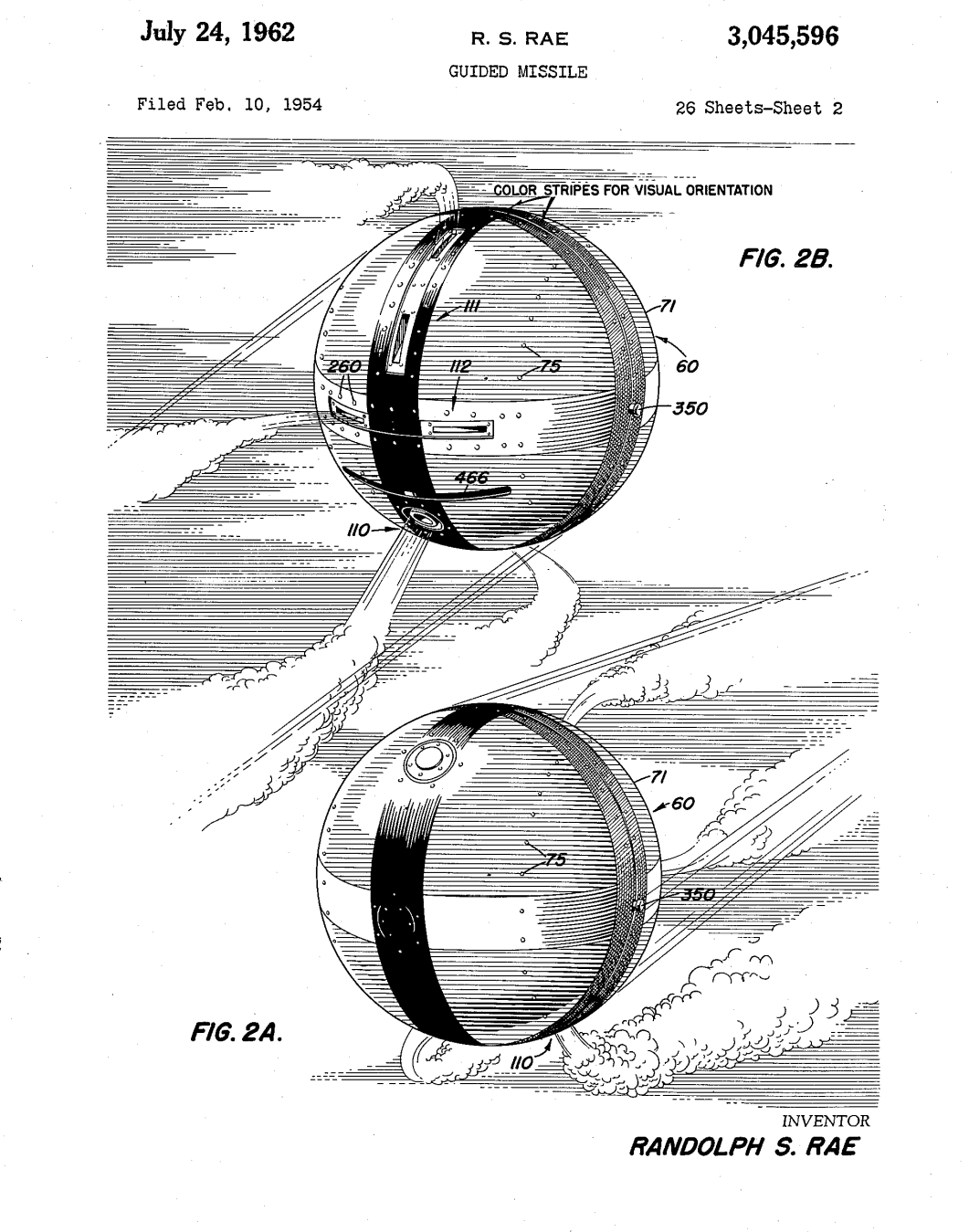
An illustration of a Cannonball missile in flight, from the US patent.

The Cannonball Missile also known as the D-40 was designed by the Applied Physics Laboratory of the Johns Hopkins University under a United States Navy contract in the early 1950s. The missile originally started out as an anti-ship missile to be launched from submarines. In 1952 the US Army Chief of Ordnance funded the project for development as an anti-tank missile. Between 1953 and 1956, around 50 D-40 missiles were test fired.

== Design ==
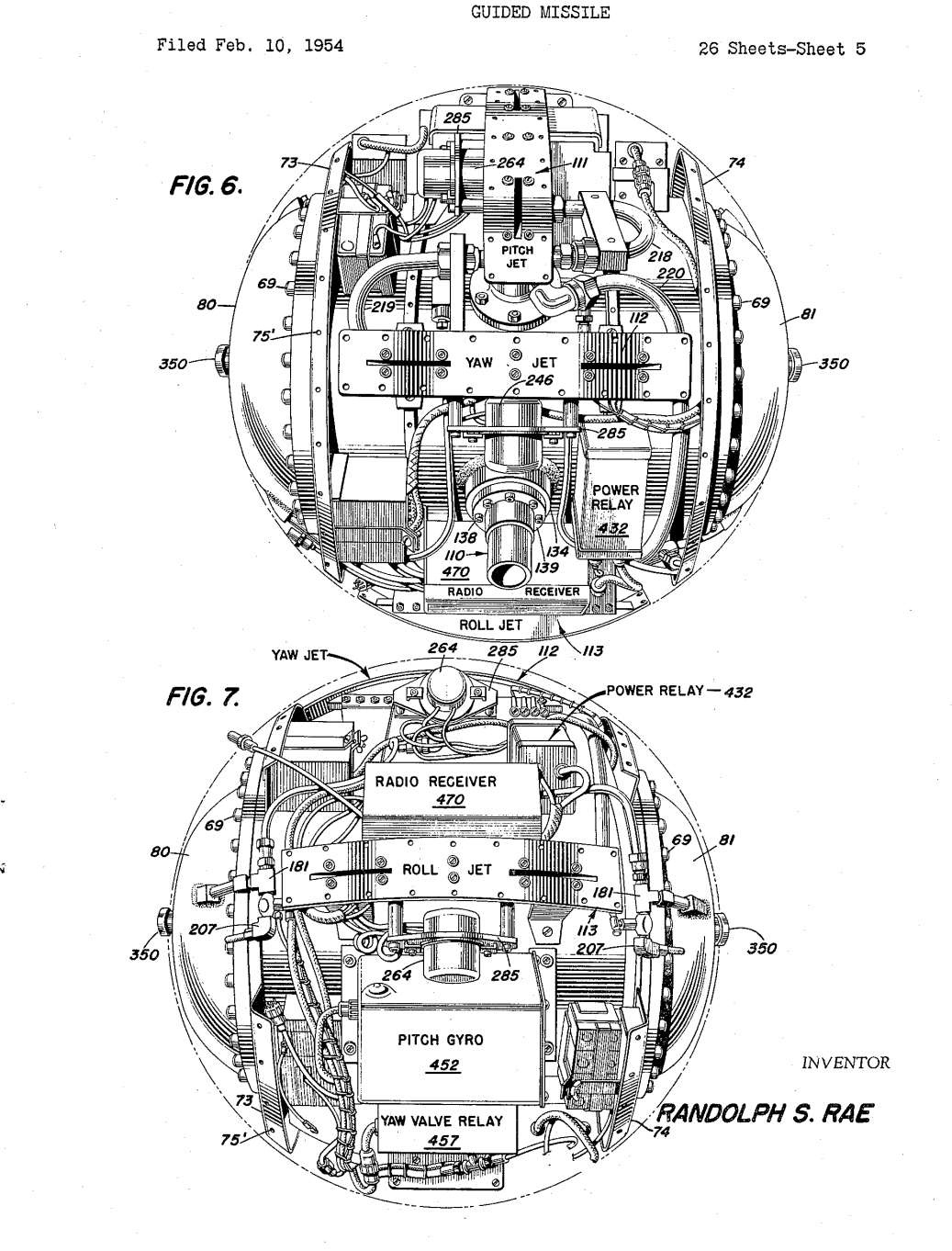
Internal components of the Cannonball missile.

The D-40 is a "spherically" shaped missile about 24 inches (61 cm) in diameter and had a maximum range around 3,000 yards (2.7 km). The D-40 was propelled by a solid-fueled rocket and stabilized using three pairs of "tangential rocket nozzles" and was guided originally by radio signals and later by signals sent down a wire trailing behind the missile. The first design, the "D-40A", weighed 300 pounds (140 kg) while the later versions "D-40B" and "D-40C" were around 150 lbs.

The main rocket was angled downward at 45 degrees in order to give the missile the necessary lift and to propel the missile forward. While the six “tangential rocket nozzles” stabilized the missile by controlling the pitch, roll, and yaw. While in flight the missile is guided by means of joystick and binoculars.

The development of the "D-40B" focused on reducing the missiles weight and increasing the range. The "D-40C" replaced the rocket fuel of the first two types with a new type which caused less smoke when it burned allowing for increased visual control of the missile by the operator.

The D-40 carried two types of warheads, either a 50 pounds (23 kg) HEAT warhead or a 65 pounds (29 kg) HESH warhead. Both types of warheads were enough to destroy all tanks of the time. In 1956 it was decided that the missile was too expensive and there were worries that the bulky D-40 missile would be too difficult to operate in combat.

== Specifications ==
=== D-40A ===
- Diameter: 58 cm (23 in)
- Weight: 135 kg (298 lb)
- Speed: 800 km/h (500 mph)
- Range: 2,930 m (3,200 yd)
- Propulsion: Solid-fueled rocket

=== D-40B ===
- Diameter: 50 cm (20 in)
- Weight: 69 kg (152 lb)
- Speed: 800 km/h (500 mph)
- Range:2,480 m (2,710 yd)
- Propulsion: Solid-fueled rocket

=== D-40C ===
- Diameter: 50 cm (20 in)
- Weight:78 kg (172 lb)
- Speed: 800 km/h (500 mph)
- Range: 1,370 m (4,490 ft)
- Propulsion: Solid-fueled rocket
