= Il nous faut =

Single by Elisa Tovati & Tom Dice

from the album Le syndrome de Peter Pan
- Released: 11 May 2011
- Recorded: 2010
- Genre: Pop
- Label: Play On
- Songwriter(s): John Mamann

Elisa Tovati singles chronology
"Débile menthol" (2006)	"Il nous faut" (2011)

Tom Dice singles chronology
"A Thousand Years" (2011)	"Il nous faut" (2011)	"Sunlight" (2011)

"Il nous faut" is a song performed by French singer Elisa Tovati and Belgian singer-songwriter Tom Dice released from her third studio album Le syndrome de Peter Pan (2011). It was released on 11 May 2011 as a digital download in France. It peaked at number 6 in France.

== Music video ==
A music video to accompany the release of "Il nous faut" and was uploaded to YouTube on 20 June 2011 at a total length of three minutes and six seconds.

== Track listing ==
Digital download
No.	Title	Producer(s)	Length
1.	"Il nous faut"	John Mamann	3:05

== Chart performance ==
On 21 May 2011 "Il nous faut" entered the French Singles Chart at number 92, in its second week it climbed to number 48, in its third week it climbed to number 28, it has so far peaked to number 6. It has also reached number 1 in Belgium and 37 in Switzerland.

=== Weekly charts ===
Chart (2011)	Peak position
Belgium (Ultratop 50 Flanders)	1
Belgium (Ultratop 50 Wallonia)	1
France (SNEP)	6
Netherlands (Single Top 100)	76
Switzerland (Schweizer Hitparade)	36

=== Year-end charts ===
Chart (2011)	Position
Belgium (Ultratop Flanders)	29
Belgium (Ultratop Wallonia)	26

=== Certifications ===
Region	Certification	Certified units/sales
Belgium (BEA)	Gold	10,000^{*}
^{*} Sales figures based on certification alone.

== Release history ==
Region	Date	Format	Label
France	11 May 2011	Digital download	Play On
