= Jumpstart (song) =

Single by These Kids Wear Crowns

from the album Jumpstart
- Released: January 31, 2011
- Genre: Dance pop; electropop
- Length: 3:28
- Label: EMI Canada/Capitol
- Songwriters: Matt Squire; Damon Sharpe; Pebe Sebert
- Producer: Matt Squire

These Kids Wear Crowns singles chronology
"Break It Up" (2010)	"Jumpstart" (2011)	"I Wanna Dance with Somebody" (2011)

Music video
- "Jumpstart" on YouTube

"Jumpstart" is a song by Canadian pop rock band These Kids Wear Crowns. It was released on January 31, 2011, via EMI Canada/Capitol Records, as the second single from their debut studio album, Jumpstart. The song peaked at number 44 on the Canadian Hot 100 and was certified Gold by Music Canada. It also reached number 17 on the Australian Singles Chart. It was certified 2× Platinum by Australian Recording Industry Association.

The song was nominated for three awards, two at the 2011 MuchMusic Video Awards for UR Fave: Video and Post Production of the Year, and one at the 2012 Canadian Radio Music Awards for CHR: Song of the Year.

== Background ==
"Jumpstart" was released on January 31, 2011, for digital download in Canada. The song later gained popularity in Australia, which led to it being released as a single in the country as well. Speaking about song's rise in popularity overseas, singer Alexander Johnson said, "we just came down to talk with a bunch of people and heard what the plan was for releasing our album. Once the single got released, thanks to everyone in Australia, because it has done so well down there. It definitely gave us an opportunity to look at coming back and this tour opportunity came up."

The song was written by Matt Squire, Damon Sharpe and Pebe Sebert, while production as handled by Matt Squire. The track is described as electropop and dance-pop.

== Chart performance ==
"Jumpstart" debuted at number 93 on the Canadian Hot 100. The song later reached number 44, where it would peak. The song also reached numbers 19 and 35 on the Canada CHR/Top 40 and Canada Hot AC Airplay charts, respectively. Due to its strong radio airplay in Australia, the song peaked at number 17 and spent 16 weeks on the Australian Singles Chart. The song appeared on the Australian Singles 2011 year-end chart, reaching number 84. It was certified Gold by Music Canada and 2× Platinum by Australian Recording Industry Association.

== Awards and nominations ==
Awards and nominations for "Jumpstart"
Year	Organization	Award	Result	Ref(s)
2011	MuchMusic Video Awards	UR Fave: Video	Nominated	
2011	MuchMusic Video Awards	Post Production of the Year	Nominated	
2012	Canadian Radio Music Awards	CHR: Song of the Year	Nominated	

== Music video ==
The music video for "Jumpstart" was released on February 24, 2011, and was directed by Colin Minihan. It premiered on March 7, 2011, via VEVO, and on MuchMusic in April. The video was nominated for two awards at the 2011 MuchMusic Video Awards: UR Fave: Video and Post Production of the Year.

== Personnel ==
Credits for "Jumpstart" adapted from the album's liner notes.

These Kids Wear Crowns

- Alex Johnson – lead vocals
- Alan Poettcker – bass guitar, vocals
- Matt Vink – keyboards, backing vocals
- Joshua "Gypsy" McDaniel – guitar, backing vocals
- Josh Mitchinson – drums
- Joe Porter – guitar, backing vocals

Production

- Matt Squire – producer, mixing
- Stephen Marcussen – mastering
- Travis Huff – engineer

== Charts ==
=== Weekly charts ===
Weekly chart performance for "Jumpstart"
Chart (2011)	Peak position
Australia (ARIA)	17
Canada (Canadian Hot 100)	44
Canada CHR/Top 40 (Billboard)	19
Canada Hot AC (Billboard)	35

=== Year-end charts ===
Year-end chart performance for "Jumpstart"
Chart (2011)	Position
Australia (ARIA)	84

== Certifications ==
Certifications and sales for "Jumpstart"
Region	Certification	Certified units/sales
Australia (ARIA)	2× Platinum	140,000^{^}
Canada (Music Canada)	Gold	40,000^{*}
^{*} Sales figures based on certification alone.^{^} Shipments figures based on certification alone.

== Release history ==
Release dates and formats for "Jumpstart"
Region	Date	Format	Label	Ref.
Canada	January 31, 2011	Digital download	EMI Canada/Capitol	
