= One Life (Hedley song) =

Single by Hedley

from the album Storms
- Released: October 24, 2011
- Length: 3:33
- Label: Universal Music Canada
- Songwriters: Jacob Hoggard; Matt Squire; Lucas Banker
- Producer: Brian Howes

Hedley singles chronology
"Invincible" (2011)	"One Life" (2011)	"Kiss You Inside Out" (2012)

Music video
- "One Life" on YouTube

"One Life" is a song by Canadian pop rock band Hedley. It was released on October 24, 2011, as the second single from their fourth studio album Storms. The song peaked at number 16 on the Canadian Hot 100 and reached within the top 30 on the Canada AC, Canada CHR/Top 40 and Canada Hot AC airplay charts. It was certified Platinum by Music Canada in March 2012.

== Background ==
On October 24, 2011, Storms was made available for pre-orders via iTunes and those who pre-ordered would receive an instant download of "One Life". Guitarist Dave Rosin described the track as one that has a "good feeling" to it.

== Composition ==
"One Life" was written by Jacob Hoggard, Matt Squire and Lucas Banker, while production was handled by Brian Howes.

== Music video ==
A teaser video for "One Life" was released on December 12, 2011. The music video for the song premiered via MuchMusic on December 14. The video was also released onto VEVO and was directed by Marc Ricciardelli. It was nominated for a MuchMusic Video Award for Most Watched Video, but lost to "Call Me Maybe" by Carly Rae Jepsen.

== Awards and nominations ==
Awards and nominations for "One Life"
Year	Organization	Award	Result	Ref(s)
2012	MuchMusic Video Awards	MuchMusic.com Most Watched Video of the Year	Nominated	
2014	SOCAN Awards	Pop/Rock Music Award	Won	

== Personnel ==
Credits for "One Life" adapted from the album's liner notes.

Hedley

- Jacob Hoggard – vocals, keyboard
- Dave Rosin – electric guitar, background vocals
- Tommy Mac – bass, background vocals
- Chris Crippin – drums, background vocals

Production

- Brian Howes – producer
- Serban Ghenea – mixing
- Chris Lord-Alge – mixing
- Mark Needham – mixing

== Charts ==
=== Weekly charts ===
Weekly chart performance for "One Life"
Chart (2011–12)	Peak position
Canada (Canadian Hot 100)	16
Canada AC (Billboard)	29
Canada CHR/Top 40 (Billboard)	16
Canada Hot AC (Billboard)	7

=== Year-end charts ===
Year-end chart performance for "One Life"
Chart (2012)	Position
Canada (Canadian Hot 100)	57

== Certifications ==
Certifications and sales for "One Life"
Region	Certification	Certified units/sales
Canada (Music Canada)	Platinum	80,000^{*}
^{*} Sales figures based on certification alone.

== Release history ==
Release dates and formats for "One Life"
Region	Date	Format	Label	Ref.
Various	October 24, 2011	Digital download	Universal Music Canada	
