= These Kids Wear Crowns =

Canadian boy band

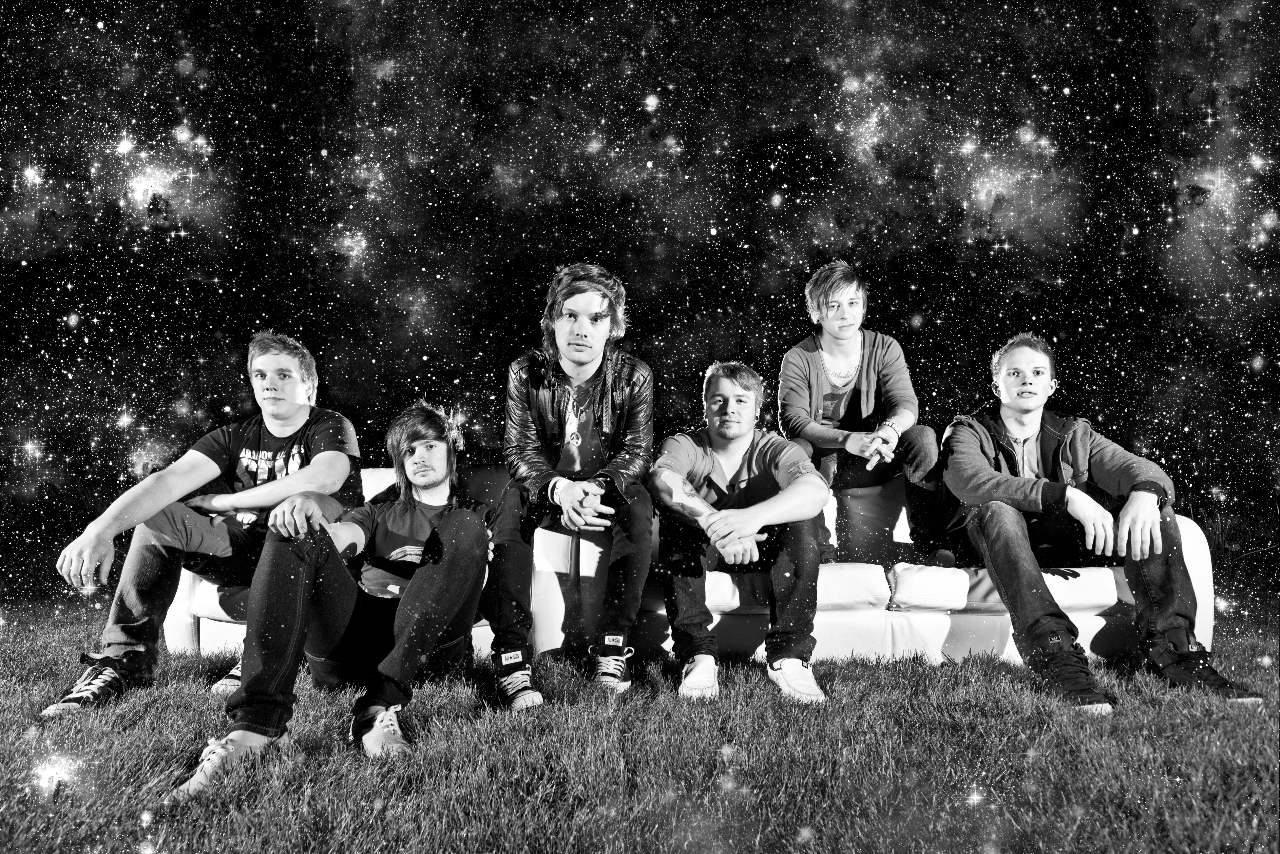

Background information
- Also known as: TKWC
- Origin: Chilliwack, British Columbia, Canada
- Genres: Power pop; pop rock; rock
- Years active: 2009–2019
- Label: Capitol Records/EMI
- Past members: Alex Johnson; Alan Poettcker; Matt Vink; Josh Mitchinson; Josh "Gypsy" McDaniel; Joe Porter

These Kids Wear Crowns was a Canadian power pop and pop-rock band, formed in 2009 in Chilliwack, British Columbia, Canada. They were "discovered" on MuchMusic's disBand and signed to a contract with Capitol Records/EMI. They have performed with acts such as Hedley, Faber Drive, Forever the Sickest Kids, Good Charlotte, and Lights. They re-issued their self-titled EP on August 31, 2010, originally released in 2009.

In the fall of 2010, These Kids Wear Crowns returned to the studio to record their full-length album, entitled Jumpstart, which was released on March 1, 2011. The album features the singles "Break it Up" and "Jumpstart" and a cover of the Whitney Houston song "I Wanna Dance with Somebody", the latter two were certified Gold by Music Canada. Their second album Still Having Fun was released on November 17, 2015.

== History ==
=== 2009–2010: Early years ===
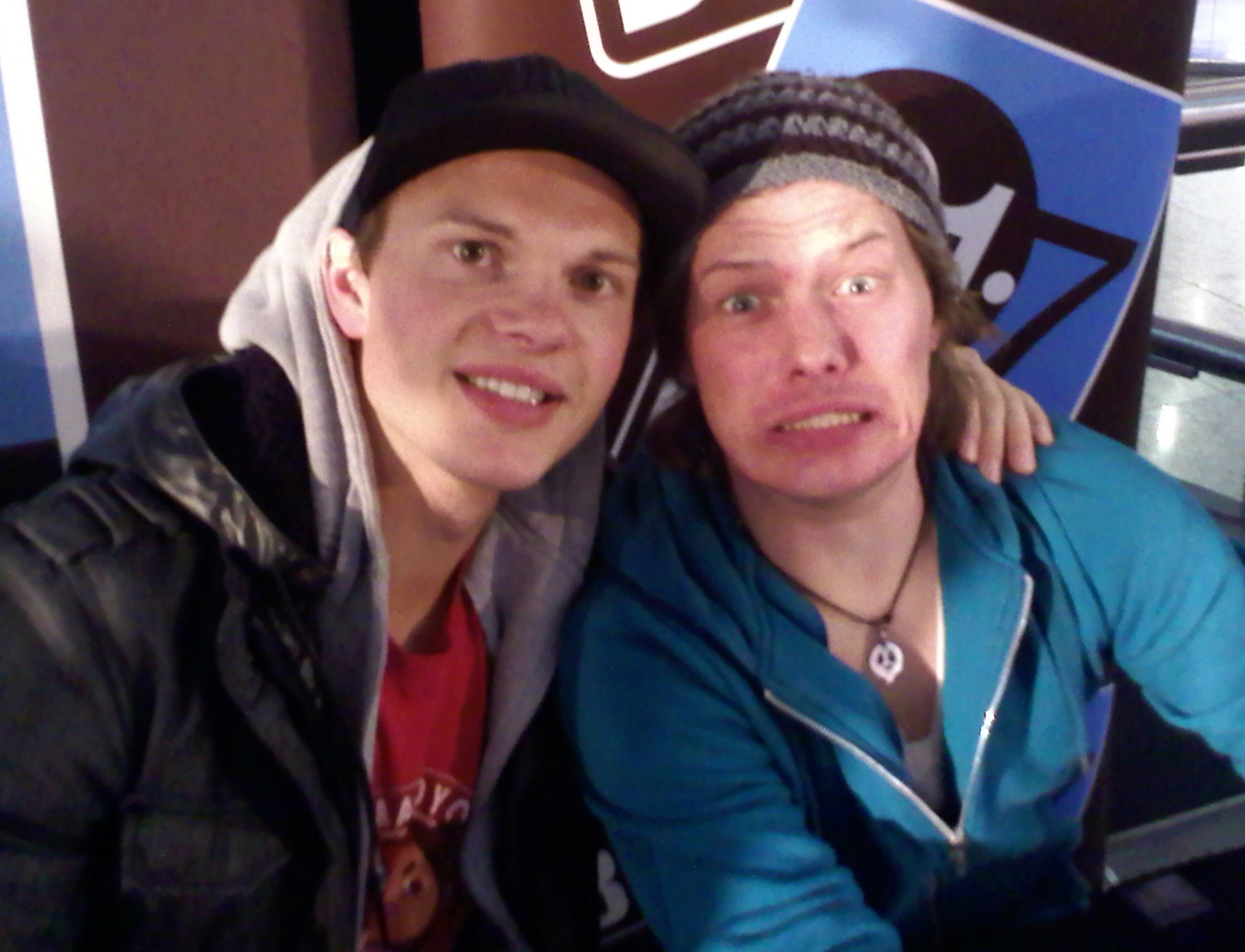
Founding members Alan Poettcker and Alex Johnson.

Alex Johnson and Alan Poettcker knew each other from high school, where they wrote songs together. Originally forming the band, Goodnight Medic along with Matt Vink, the group placed in the top 10 of the 2008 Fox Seeds contest, but broke up in February 2009, via a Facebook announcement, stating "We will be back again in the form of something great and new." Alex, Alan, and Matt formed a new group called These Kids Wear Crowns, recruiting guitarist Joe Porter and drummer Josh Mitchinson. In the summer of 2009, the band recorded their first EP, recorded and produced by Steve Klassen, at the Sound Suite in Abbotsford, British Columbia. The EP was released on September 11, 2009. In the fall of 2009, the band went on a cross-Canada tour with fellow Vancouver-area band A Trophy Life. During this tour, they received news that they were selected to appear on MuchMusic's disBand in Toronto, Ontario. Needing a second guitarist, they recruited A Trophy Life's guitarist Joshua "Gypsy" McDaniel.

Appearing on the second season of disBand, they received a "thumbs up" on the show, earning a major label record deal with Capitol Records/EMI Music Canada. EMI Music Canada's president Deane Cameron called the band "incredibly talented and innovative," explaining the reason on signing the group. The band also gained interest from TQ Management and SL Feldman, eventually signing with both agencies. In early 2010, they traveled to Dallas, Texas, to record tracks for their then-upcoming debut album with producer Geoff Rockwell. In April 2010, they shot their video for "Break it Up". In May 2010, they were the opening act for the Western Canadian leg of Faber Drive's Can't Keep a Secret Tour, alongside Jesse Labelle and The Latency. In June 2010, they headlined their own tour dubbed "The Not Really a Tour Tour" with shows in Alberta, Saskatchewan, and Ontario. In August 2010, it was announced that they would join Hedley on their The Show Must Go on the Road Tour, alongside Lights and San Sebastian, during September 2010. On August 31, 2010, their self-titled EP was reissued. The band worked with producer Mark Needham and the remastered EP features a new track, an acoustic version of "Break it Up" and an electro remix of "Holding On". The group's EP debuted at No. 141 on the Canadian Albums Chart.

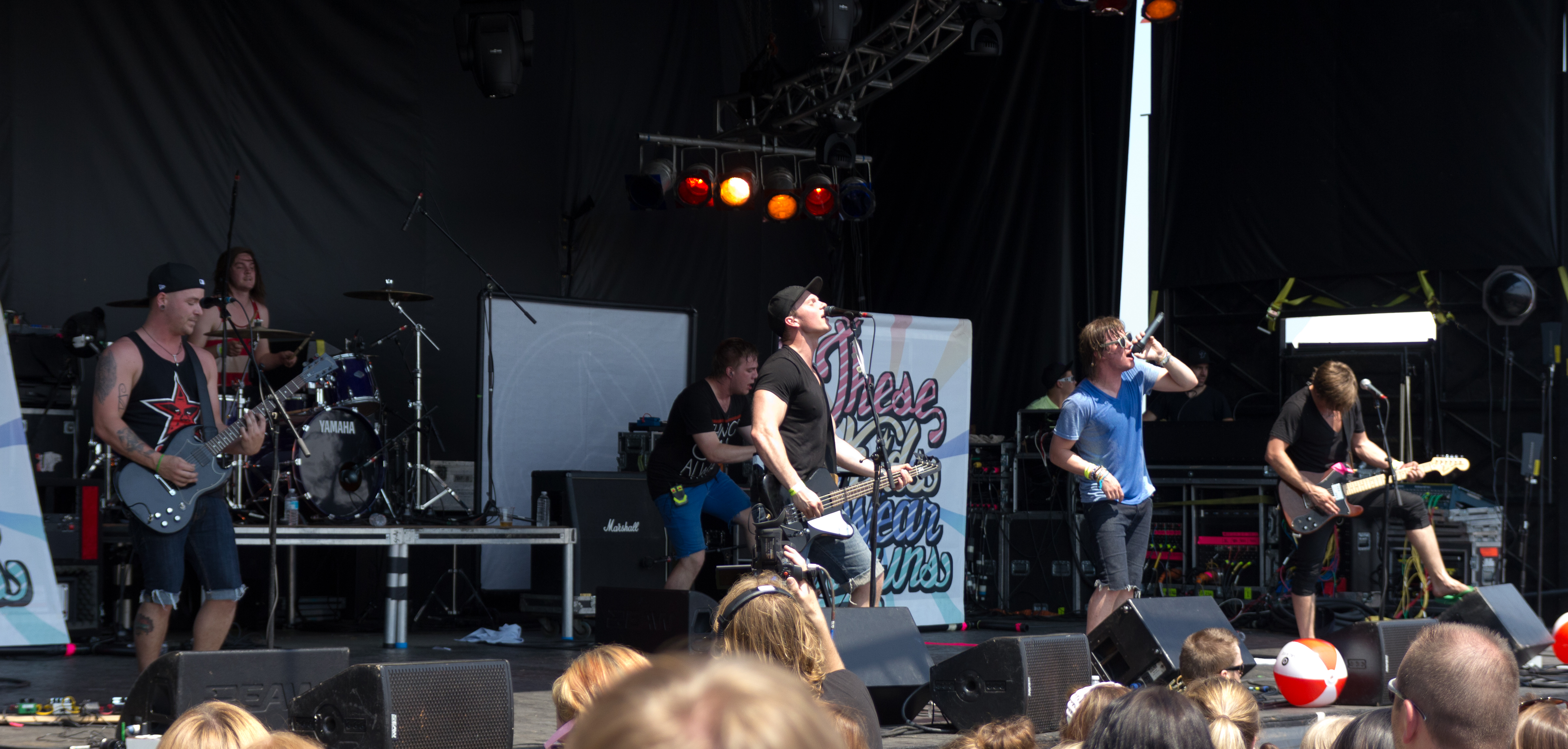
Performing in June 2011

=== 2010–2013: Jumpstart ===
In August 2010, they began recording their debut full-length album Jumpstart, with producer Garth Richardson and Matt Squire. On August 17, the band released "Break it Up" digitally as the album's first single. A music video for the single premiered on MuchMusic the following day, after an episode of disBand. The song also debuted at No. 60 on the Canadian Hot 100. In October, the band appeared on Degrassi to perform the track. On November 30, 2010, they released their original Christmas track "Red White and You" as an iTunes exclusive single. They performed at CityTV's New Year's Eve Bash at Nathan Phillips Square in Toronto, in December 2010.

Jumpstart was released on March 1, 2011. The album peaked at No. 31 on the Canadian Albums Chart. The title track was released on January 31, 2011, as the second single from the album. A music video for the song was also released. It peaked at No. 44 on the Canadian Hot 100. In March and April 2011, These Kids Wear Crowns did a Canada-wide tour with Fefe Dobson. They also performed shows in Toronto and Ottawa, as well as embarking on their "True North Strong and Free Tour" in Western Canada. In May 2011, These Kids Wear Crowns did their first overseas performances in Singapore at Music Matters alongside Simple Plan. The band's song "Jumpstart" was nominated for two awards at the 2011 MuchMusic Video Awards, UR Fave: Video and Post Production of the Year.

On June 27, the band released a cover of Whitney Houston's "I Wanna Dance with Somebody" as the album's third single. The song peaked at No. 30 on the Canadian Hot 100. A French version featuring Brigitte Boisjoli titled "I Wanna Dance with Somebody (Danser Toute la Nuit)" and a Spanish version featuring Eiza González titled "I Wanna Dance with Somebody (Quiero Bailar Esta Noche)" were also released. In the summer of 2011, These Kids Wear Crowns toured across Canada once again performing at various festivals across the country. "Jumpstart" was released as a single in Australia in July 2011, where the song found success in the country. The song reached No. 17 on the Australian Singles Chart and was certified 2× Platinum by the Australian Recording Industry Association. In October 2011, These Kids Wear Crowns toured Australia. On November 24, the group's music video for "Lifetime" premiered via MuchMusic. In December 2011, These Kids Wear Crowns went overseas to Singapore again to perform on December 31, 2011 for 2012 Marina Bay Countown.

The band toured with Simple Plan on their "Get On Your Heart! Tour" in Canada, alongside All Time Low and Marianas Trench in February 2012. On February 7, 2012, "This Party Never Stops" was released digitally as a promotional single. These Kids Wear Crowns appeared on the Soundwave Festival 2012, joining Cobra Starship, Forever the Sickest Kids and Kill Hannah. On April 5, the band headlined a concert at the Chilliwack Cultural Centre. They returned to the Chilliwack Cultural Centre for a charity concert for the BC Children's Hospital Foundation in December 2012. The music video for "I Wanna Dance with Somebody" was nominated for Post Production of the Year at the 2012 MuchMusic Video Awards.

=== 2014–2019: Still Having Fun ===
The band made a performance at the Terry Fox Theatre during a showcase of The Bullying Games on April 2, 2013. Later that year, it was revealed that the band was in the process of recording their second album. Working with songwriters in Toronto and Los Angeles, Johnson said the band would be finishing up the album in August, which would include a B-side song paying homage to their hometown. Around this time, EMI Music Canada was sold to Universal Music Canada and as a result, new material being written by the band would be moved to the new label. The band also moved to a new management, Coalition Music. After three years, the band released a new single titled "Love This City" in September 2014. The music video was released in November. Filmed in late August, in Toronto, it was directed by Colin Minihan.

By October 2014, the band had written over 70 songs for the album, however, only "Love This City" was released as a single. The song did not perform well on the charts and ultimately they parted ways with Universal Music Canada. Though Johnson faulted himself and the band for "not producing the music that Universal was looking for," he also stated the label "didn't see the logic in putting money into something that doesn't have the feedback their seeing from other artists who have less than 6 members and don't cost as much to make look good. Everyone on both labels had been very kind to us, although sometimes communication was lacking once we left EMI. In the end, music is a business and results determine your worth." Additionally, he revealed that the reason the band wasn't putting out music for a few years was due to them running out of money to tour and fund the record.

In January 2015, singer Alexander Johnson announced he would be running for Parliament as a member of the Libertarian Party of Canada for the riding of Chilliwack-Hope.

With the band now independent, they re-started working on their second album, all written and recorded in Poettcker's studio. On November 17, 2015, These Kids Wear Crowns released their second studio album, Still Having Fun. The album was preceded by its lead single "The Best Is Yet to Come", released on November 2. Despite releasing the album, Johnson stated there was no immediate plans of a tour to support the album.

On December 29, 2019, the band performed a show in Chilliwack, at the Major League Taphouse. Since then, the band has remained inactive.

Lead guitarist Joe Porter died on March 9, 2024.

== Musical styles and influences ==
The band's music is described as power pop, pop rock and rock. It has also been described as "party core."

== Band members ==
=== Former ===
- Alexander Johnson – lead vocals (2009–2019)
- Alan Poettcker – bass, vocals (2009–2019)
- Matt Vink – keyboards, backing vocals (2009–2019)
- Joshua "Gypsy" McDaniel – guitar, backing vocals (2009–2019)
- Josh Mitchinson – drums (2009–2019)
- Joe Porter – guitar, backing vocals (2009–2019; died 2024)

== Discography ==
=== Studio albums ===
List of albums, with selected chart positions
Title	Album details	Peak chart positions
Title	Album details	CAN
Jumpstart	Released: March 1, 2011; Label: EMI Canada/Capitol; Format: CD, digital download	31
Still Having Fun	Released: November 17, 2015; Label: EMI Canada/Capitol; Format: CD, digital download	—
"—" denotes releases that did not chart.

=== Extended plays ===
List of extended plays, with selected chart positions
Title	Album details	Peak chart positions
Title	Album details	CAN
These Kids Wear Crowns (Note: The EP was re-issued on August 31, 2010, via EMI Canada/Capitol Records.)	Released: September 11, 2009; Label: Self-released; Format: CD, digital download	141

=== Singles ===
List of singles, with selected chart positions and certifications, showing year released and album name
Title	Year	Peak chart positions					Certifications	Album
Title	Year	CAN	CAN AC	CAN CHR	CAN HAC	AUS	Certifications	Album
"Break It Up"	2010	60	—	20	28	—		Jumpstart
"Jumpstart"	2011	44	—	19	35	17	MC: Gold; ARIA: 2× Platinum	Jumpstart
"I Wanna Dance with Somebody"	2011	30	49	14	41	51	MC: Gold	Jumpstart
"Love This City"	2014	—	—	—	—	—		Non-album single
"The Best Is Yet to Come"	2015	—	—	—	—	—		Still Having Fun
"Kiss"	2016	—	—	—	—	—		Non-album single
"—" denotes releases that did not chart or was not released in that territory.

=== Promotional singles ===
List of promotional singles, with selected chart positions, showing year released and album name
Title	Year	Peak chart positions	Album
Title	Year	SGP	Album
"Red White and You"	2010	—	Non-album promotional single
"Lifetime"	2011	—	Jumpstart
"This Party Never Stops"	2012	5	Jumpstart
"—" denotes a single that did not chart or was not released in that territory.

=== Music videos ===
Title	Year	Director(s)
"Break it Up"	2010	Elvis Prusic
"Jumpstart"	2011	Colin Minihan
"I Wanna Dance with Somebody"	2011	Colin Minihan
"Lifetime"	2011	—N/a
"This Party Never Stops"	2012	—N/a
"Love This City"	2014	Colin Minihan

== Awards and nominations ==
Year	Association	Category	Nominated work	Result	Ref.
2011	MuchMusic Video Awards	UR Fave: Video	"Jumpstart"	Nominated	
2011	MuchMusic Video Awards	Post Production of the Year	"Jumpstart"	Nominated	
2012	MuchMusic Video Awards	Post Production of the Year	"I Wanna Dance With Somebody"	Nominated	
2012	Canadian Radio Music Awards	CHR: Song of the Year	"Jumpstart"	Nominated	
