= Invincible (Hedley song) =

Single by Hedley featuring P. Reign

from the album Storms
- Released: August 22, 2011
- Genre: Pop rock
- Length: 3:43
- Label: Universal
- Songwriter(s): Jacob Hoggard; Brian Howes; Jason Van Poederooyen
- Producer(s): Brian Howes

Hedley singles chronology
"Sweater Song" (2010)	"Invincible" (2011)	"One Life" (2011)

Music video
- "Invincible" on YouTube

"Invincible" is a song recorded by Canadian pop rock group Hedley for their fourth studio album, Storms (2011). Written by Hedley frontman Jacob Hoggard and Jason Van Poederooyen, and co-written and produced by Brian Howes, "Invincible" features guest vocals by Canadian hip hop artist P. Reign on the single version. The song was released to radio on August 22, 2011 and to digital retailers on August 23, 2011 through Universal Music Canada as the lead single from Storms. It was well received by critics and fans, peaking in the Top 10 of the Canadian Hot 100 and being nominated for Single of the Year at the Juno Awards of 2012.

== Composition and reception ==
"Invincible" is a pop rock song with a duration of three minutes and forty-three seconds and an anthemic message of staying strong – or "invincible" – and rising above life's challenges. Francois Marchand of The Vancouver Sun described the song as "a positive-minded, empowerment-driven kind of song" that is indicative of the more mature themes explored on this album. In the first week of the release, it sold over 14,000 copies.

== Music video ==
Directed by Kyle Davison, the music video for "Invincible" premiered on September 6, 2011. To convey the song's message of overcoming adversity in one's life, Davison explained to Dose.ca that it was important to him to "include some people in this [video] and cast it so that the people involved have an emotional stake." It depicts a handful of characters dealing with depression and insecurities, who find peace of mind and smile towards the end of the video; footage of the band performing in a field in the rain and, after the refrain, in sunlight is cut in with these stories. The video for "Invincible" was nominated for five awards at the 2012 MMVAs, including Video of the Year, however it ultimately lost three of the awards to Carly Rae Jepsen's "Call Me Maybe", Cinematographer of the Year to Marianas Trench's "Fallout", and Pop Video of the Year to Marianas Trench's "Haven't Had Enough".

== Awards and nominations ==
Awards and nominations for "Invincible"
Year	Organization	Award	Result	Ref(s)
2011	SOCAN Awards	No. 1 Song Award	Won	
2012	MuchMusic Video Awards	Video of the Year	Nominated	
2012	MuchMusic Video Awards	Cinematographer of the Year	Nominated	
2012	MuchMusic Video Awards	Pop Video of the Year	Nominated	
2012	MuchMusic Video Awards	UR Fave Video of the Year	Nominated	
2012	MuchMusic Video Awards	Most Streamed Video of the Year	Nominated	
2012	Juno Awards	Single of the Year	Nominated	
2012	SOCAN Awards	Pop/Rock Music Award	Won	

== Track listing ==
Digital download – single
No.	Title	Length
1.	"Invincible (Rap Version)"	3:44
2.	"Invincible"	3:45

== Charts ==
=== Weekly charts ===
Weekly chart performance for "Invincible"
Chart (2011–12)	Peak position
Canada (Canadian Hot 100)	9
Canada AC (Billboard)	7
Canada CHR/Top 40 (Billboard)	14
Canada Hot AC (Billboard)	6

=== Year-end charts ===
Year-end chart performance for "Invincible"
Chart (2011)	Position
Canada (Canadian Hot 100)	69
Chart (2012)	Position
Canada (Canadian Hot 100)	97

== Certifications ==
Certifications and sales for "Invincible"
Region	Certification	Certified units/sales
Canada (Music Canada)	2× Platinum	160,000^{*}
^{*} Sales figures based on certification alone.
