= I Wanna Dance with Somebody (Who Loves Me) =

1987 single by Whitney Houston

Single by Whitney Houston

from the album Whitney
- B-side: "Moment of Truth"
- Released: April 27, 1987
- Recorded: September 1986 – January 1987
- Studio: Tarpan (San Rafael, California); The Plant (Sausalito, California); Right Track (Manhattan)
- Genre: Pop; dance-pop; R&B
- Length: 4:51
- Label: Arista
- Songwriters: George Merrill; Shannon Rubicam; Whitney Houston (uncredited)
- Producer: Narada Michael Walden

Whitney Houston singles chronology
"Greatest Love of All" (1986)	"I Wanna Dance with Somebody (Who Loves Me)" (1987)	"Didn't We Almost Have It All" (1987)

Music video
- "I Wanna Dance With Somebody (Who Loves Me)" on YouTube

"I Wanna Dance with Somebody (Who Loves Me)" is a song recorded by American singer Whitney Houston, the lead single from her second studio album, Whitney (1987). The song was aimed to bring Houston a more accessible pop sound to compete with her contemporaries after enjoying hits with ballads on her debut album Whitney Houston (1985). The song was written by George Merrill and Shannon Rubicam, of the band Boy Meets Girl, the songwriters of Houston's previous hit, "How Will I Know", and produced by Narada Michael Walden. The song's lyrics depict a woman seeking a special person to "dance in the life with" forever. Houston contributed uncredited lyrics while also receiving credit for being the song's vocal arranger.

Released on April 27, 1987 by Arista Records, it received initial mixed reviews from music critics, who praised Houston's vocal performance but critiqued its musical arrangement comparing it to "How Will I Know" and Cyndi Lauper's "Girls Just Want to Have Fun". The song became a global hit, topping the charts in 17 countries, including the United States, where it became Houston's fourth consecutive chart-topper on the Billboard Hot 100. It is her second most successful single on the Hot 100. It also topped the Billboard Adult Contemporary chart and became her first number-one single on its Dance/Disco Club Play chart, while also crossing over successfully on the Hot Black Singles chart. It is certified 9× platinum by the Recording Industry Association of America (RIAA). With sales of over 18 million copies worldwide, it is the best-selling single by a female artist in the 1980s, the best-selling single worldwide in 1987 and is also one of the best-selling singles of all time. As of November 2026, the song has reached over 1.8 billion streams on Spotify, making it one of the most streamed songs of all time as well as Houston's most popular song on the platform. The single has since been cited as one of her signature songs, while also helping to make the Whitney album one of the best-selling albums of all time. In 2022, the song's title would be used as part of the title in the biopic of the singer's life.

"I Wanna Dance with Somebody (Who Loves Me)" won Houston the 1988 Grammy Award for Best Female Pop Vocal Performance, as well as an American Music Award, while producer Walden won the 1988 Grammy for Producer of the Year, Non-Classical. The song has since received reappraisal from critics who have now stated that the song is one of the greatest songs ever recorded, making several best-of lists, including Rolling Stone, who ranked it among their list of the greatest songs of all time in its 2021 entry, and was named the best pop song of all time by Billboard in 2023. In addition, American Songwriter named the song the most iconic song to come out of the 1980s in 2023, while Screen Rant listed it at number 7 in its 1980s list, the same website ranked the song as the most defining pop song of all time in another list, both in 2025.

== Background and writing ==
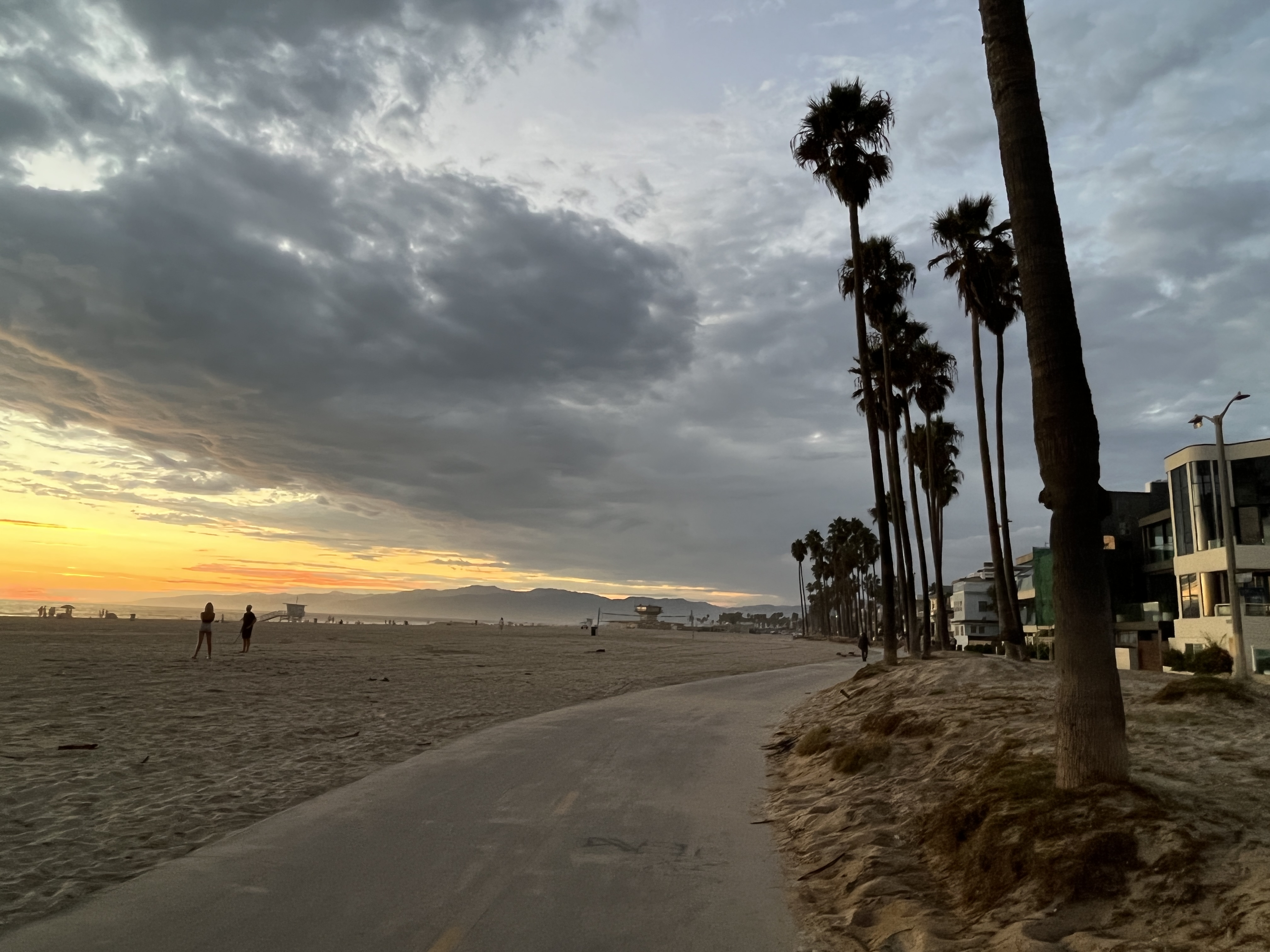
Venice, Los Angeles at dusk, similar to how it looked when the concept of "I Wanna Dance with Somebody (Who Loves Me)" was born.

By June of 1986, Houston had achieved global success with her first album Whitney Houston (1985). Released in February 1985, the album produced four Top 10 singles on the Billboard Hot 100, including three consecutive number-one singles—"Saving All My Love for You", "How Will I Know" and "Greatest Love of All"—which had made Houston the first female recording artist to achieve such a feat off a single album. That summer, as Houston was about to embark on her first world tour, her boss, Arista Records head Clive Davis, began plans for Houston's follow-up to her landmark debut album.

While Houston's debut produced a series of love ballads, Davis sought for a more accessible sound for the follow-up while keeping much of the same formula of the debut. Noting the success of "How Will I Know", written by George Merrill and Shannon Rubicam, of the American pop-rock band Boy Meets Girl, Davis sought the songwriters again to compose the next big pop hit for Houston. The songwriters later admitted they felt pressure on trying to find a song that would replicate the success of "How Will I Know" but were confident that whatever they wrote, Houston could make it a hit. Rubicam told Billboard in 2023: "We tried our best not to freak ourselves out because we had to follow ['How Will I Know'] up, and that’s a little challenging because of all your self-doubts. [...] We knew that she could deliver something large."

Not long after Houston's debut album became a success, Merrill and Rubicam attended Houston's August 31, 1985 show at the Greek Theatre in Los Angeles. According to the songwriters, as Houston finished "How Will I Know", a star fell from the sky, which prompted them to come up with the song "Waiting for a Star to Fall", keeping the song to themselves for over a year. Around June 1986, figuring it was perfect for Houston as Arista was starting to seek material for her second album, the composers presented it to Davis, who promptly rejected it, believing it was not suitable for Houston to record.

The songwriters later agreed that the song was "a little less universal" and that "it didn't quite have [Houston's] kind of melodies and verve." Merrill and Rubicam were then encouraged by Davis to come with a stronger song.

According to Rubicam, the idea behind "I Wanna Dance with Somebody (Who Loves Me)" came while the duo walked around their neighborhood of Venice during dusk "because there's something about that dusky hour that makes a person restless and uneasy, or a little isolated and estranged from the world in some ways... There's this social pressure, like 'I should be doing something right now.'" That feeling led to Rubicam seeing "a visual in my head about going to the club and finding company. Then it morphed into finding someone to love who would love you back and do that dance of life with you." In another interview, Rubicam explained, "I pictured somebody single wishing that they could find that special person for themselves. It wasn't, 'I wanna go down the disco and dance,' really. It was, 'I wanna do that dance of life with somebody.'"

While Rubicam's idea carried through as she wrote the first verse, she was stuck on the second, stating "You've already got a structure established in the first verse rhythmically and melodically, so you're sort of doing a crossword puzzle to make the new lyrics fit." Eventually the method proved successful in completing the song. As Rubicam later explained to Songfacts, "that song got written pretty quickly, as I recall. We had a funky little garage studio at the time, and we just hung out in there one afternoon and wrote the song, and I know we tweaked it the next day, and started recording it on our little Teac 4-track deck that we were using." The song was originally written as a rock song with Rubicam using a guide vocal. Merrill said the music behind "I Wanna Dance with Somebody (Who Loves Me)" was inspired by the new wave and synth-pop sound of the band Missing Persons.

After completing the demo of the song "by way of a PPG Wave synthesizer", said Merrill, who helped to compose the music and write the chorus with Rubicam: "I think when we were writing the chorus, we had a really good feeling. We felt confident and certainly enough so to present it to Clive [Davis]." Merrill recounts running through the airport of Trans World Airlines to present the demo of the song to Davis. Once Davis listened to the song while flying back to New York, he approved it for Houston to record. Davis recounts in 2023 that he heard hit potential in the song's chorus but felt there was "a lot that could be brought to the fore", including a new vocal and track arrangement.

== Recording and production ==
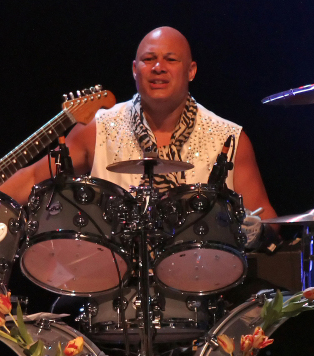
Narada Michael Walden, the producer behind "I Wanna Dance with Somebody (Who Loves Me)", initially thought the song was "too country" for Houston to record.

Davis decided upon hearing the song that producer Narada Michael Walden, who helped to produce (and co-write) "How Will I Know", should oversee production of the song. Walden admitted he wasn't impressed and that it took a little more persuading with regard to the song's potential. Walden wasn't "too keen" on having Houston record the song, as he felt the demo was "too country and western sounding," stated it "reminded [him] of a rodeo song with Olivia Newton-John singing." However, Walden later told Billboard in 2023 that he was initially drawn to the "happy and infectious" chorus, and could "hear what Davis was liking [about the demo]", but still felt he needed to funk it up to make it right for Houston. In a previous interview with Mix Online, Walden called the song "definitely white pop".

Walden further explained to Billboard his thought process in regards of presenting the pop song to black audiences: "Because I'm a Black cat, I know Whitney's African-American, and we want our people to be down... the demo was just too poppy and not grounded in the funk which it needed to be the smash for Whitney. Immediately, I'm listening to it and going, 'Whatcha gon' do, Narada, to Blacken this thing up and funk it up, so that the people in the ghetto and the nightclubs are jamming too?'" Inspired by lessons he learned from his mentor Quincy Jones, Walden said "My philosophy is the outhouse bottom with the penthouse view... if it's got nastiness on the bottom, which is really funky, but it's very pretty on top, that combination is kind of irresistible." As Walden explained it in his book on Houston in 2012, "it had to move the ghetto as well as the Onassis boat if we were going to create a hit that appealed to everybody." Walden further added that he wanted the song to be Houston's answer to her contemporaries: “I wanted to be like, ‘OK, Michael Jackson; OK, Prince; OK, Aretha; OK, whoever’s hot — get back! [Whitney’s] gonna take over everything!”

Walden recruited Randy Jackson on synth bass, along with fellow musicians such as Italian guitarist Corrado Rustici, longtime collaborator Preston Glass, who employed a Roland TR-808 that was used to produce the drum machine percussion and handclaps that started the song, drummer Gregory "Gigi" Gonaway, keyboardist Walter Afanasieff and saxophonist Marc Russo to work on the song with him, "lined up all different kinds of keyboards," and employed a very particular approach to recording Houston's vocals. Noting Houston's busy work schedule, Walden and his team worked around the limitations by recording the entire song first without Houston, so "she could easily envision what the end product would sound like." During this period, he sent a vocal demo of the song by his session vocalist Kitty Beethoven to Houston so she'd get familiar with it. Houston was already familiar with the original demo by Merrill and Rubicam prior to hearing Walden's revised demo and debuted an early version of the song during a private performance at the Convention Hall at Asbury Park, New Jersey on July 24, 1986, two days prior to the start of her Greatest Love World Tour and would perform the song alongside an early version of "Didn't We Almost Have It All" throughout that tour.

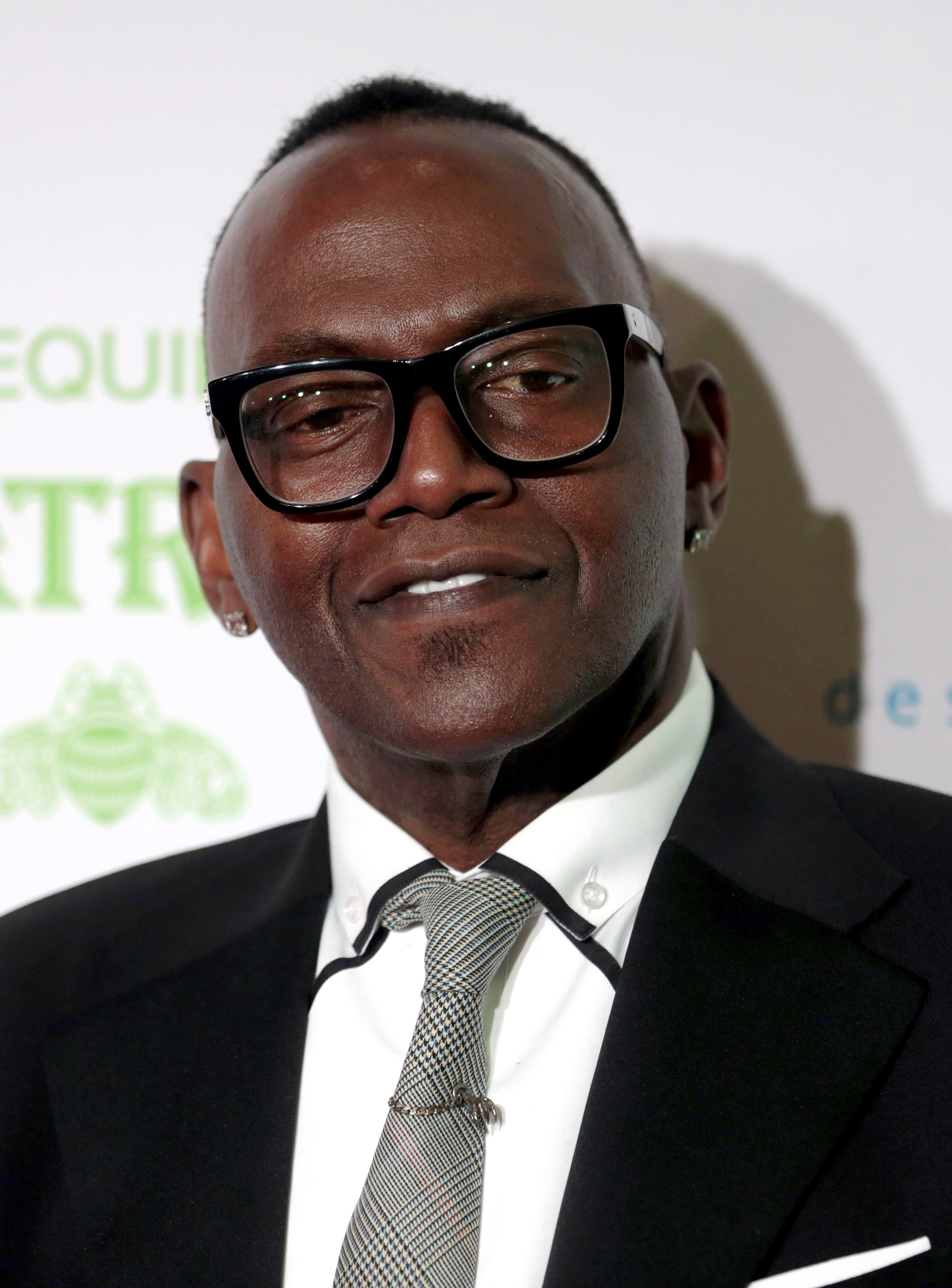
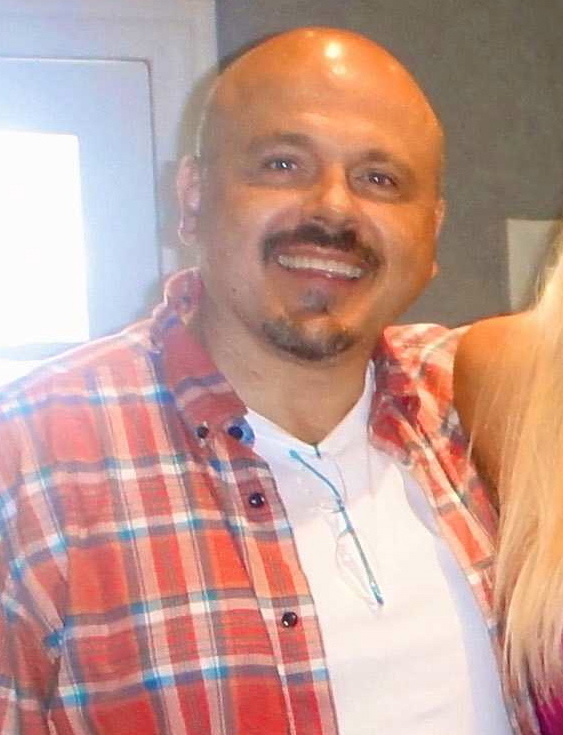
Randy Jackson and Walter Afanasieff contributed instruments on “I Wanna Dance with Somebody (Who Loves Me)”.

Since Houston's debut mostly relied on ballad singles, Walden knew that the song "had to prove that she could dominate with uptempo pop, and also fit alongside the most forward-thinking pop auteurs of the time," according to Billboard, noting popular music at the time "had made a shift with synthesizers and drum machines" inspired by the LinnDrum machines artists like Prince was using at the time, while Jones was busy hiring "the most death-defying brains to make Michael Jackson's new sounds", noting that the competition "was really high to mastermind a new sound for Whitney." Synth horns were added as a result of an engineer "playing around" with a synth overdub that Walden requested. "It was synth horns," said the producer, "but with a glizz on it that made it something we've never done before. We glizz the bass, we never glizz the horns!" In the hands of Walden and the fellow aforementioned musicians, they had turned the rock-tinged demo and "remodeled [it] in the image of a funky horn-laden anthem of human connection, which could get play in every corner of the world."

The song's recording first took place at Walden's Tarpan Studios in San Rafael in September 1986. It was one of the first songs recorded at the studio, which Walden purchased in December 1985. Further development of the song's production carried on through other studios including the Record Plant in Sausalito through December.

When Houston arrived at Tarpan Studios to record the song in December 1986, Walden noted Houston looked "weary" and had just recovered from a bronchial infection that led to the singer canceling some concerts in Australia, before ending the trek in Honolulu. The producer advised her to take a day's rest so she could record the following day. Walden asked Houston what song she wanted to record first and the singer suggested a rendition of "For the Love of You", originally recorded by the Isley Brothers. Walden noted that the song was the first time in which Houston vocally stacked herself on harmonies, which excited her as, Walden explained, "Whitney was the kind of person who loved the sound of her voice — she'd get turned on by herself!" The change in the singer's behavior encouraged Walden to approach her with recording "I Wanna Dance with Somebody".

In recording Houston, Walden explained that he had the singer record the end of the song first, to ensure that the most vocally demanding portions of the track had Houston working at full capacity. That way, the recording of the ending would help to "keep the energy high," in which he would then return to the first verse where, Walden noted, Houston "pulled back and used her little-girl voice". Noting Houston's soul music background, Walden stated, "now we can get a bit more methodical and technical... I've learned this with soul singers: If you get too technical too early, you suck the spirit out of them." Houston took a few notes from Rubicam's demo and expanded them "into a freewheeling showcase of vocal fortitude", Billboard continued. Rubicam later called Houston a "true recording artist, because she just found her way into making a song her own when she liked it." This method helped Houston to come up with her own arrangement and encourage her to have a more hands-on approach, in which she composed the call and response ending vamp, "Don't you wanna dance / Say you wanna dance?" following the final chorus which Houston had added during the early performances of the song. Billboard later called the ending vamp "the ultimate nod to her amalgamation of gospel, funk, soul and pop". Due to Houston's uncredited lyrics and ad-libs, she received credit for vocal arrangement for the song. Said Walden to Billboard in 2023, "you're hearing an excited Whitney on [that song]."

== Composition and lyrics ==
According to the sheet music published by Universal Music Publishing Group, "I Wanna Dance with Somebody (Who Loves Me)" is a pop, dance-pop and R&B song with funk and post disco elements. (Note: In its September 1, 1986 issue covering Houston's Greatest Love World Tour, Jet described the song as a "funky uptempo tune".) The song has a time signature of 4/4 common time and a tempo of 119 beats per minute.

The song begins with a series of drum claps and programmed pings before an electro-bass line by Randy Jackson is followed by Houston's "ecsta-sighs" vocals. After "a couple of measures", the song is then followed by Houston's exclamation "whoo!", which was compared to Michael Jackson's own non-verbal exclamations. The song plays in the key of G♭ major and follows a chord progression of G♭—E♭m7—C♭m9—A♭m7—B♭m—C♭6—D♭7. Three minutes and twelve seconds later, it shifts upwards to A♭ major. Houston's vocal range in the song goes from the low note of A♭_{3} to the high note of C_{6}.

The verses in the song were "obviously underplayed and wound-down from the intro", with a modal shift scene change lamenting a "lonely and disappointed" Houston's "daytime ennui" ("Clock strikes upon the hour / And the sun begins to fade"), only for her mood to pick up during the pre-chorus ("And when the night falls/ My lonely heart calls...") before horns "perk up" and a "scratching noise that sounds like a sweater being dramatically zipped and unzipped clears the way for the chorus to take off."

Between the second and third chorus, a bridge that contrasts again from the optimistic tone in which Houston sounds anxious during the unexpectedly tense and minor-sounding bridge in the song ("somebody, who!") before the optimism picks up again with the repeat of the pre-chorus from the second verse before the dramatic key change.

In their 2017 article about the song, Billboard compared the song's dramatic key change to "How Will I Know", complaining that that song's shift down at the song's critical moment "cruelly robbing it of potential transcendence", while stating "I Wanna Dance with Somebody (Who Loves Me)" was one of the few songs with "truly perfect key changes — modulations that take an already soaring pop song and send it right through the ozone layer."

This is followed by an outro with Houston's exclamations, followed by giggles and vocal ad-libs that Houston herself helped arrange ("Don't ya wanna dance? / Say you wanna dance / Don't ya wanna dance?"), followed by deep voices shouting "Dance!" throughout.

== Release ==
"I Wanna Dance with Somebody (Who Loves Me)" was sent to radio stations on April 27, 1987, but stations were rebuffed by Arista Records executives from playing the new song until the end of the month on April 30.

According to reports on both the May 2, 1987, issues of Billboard and Cashbox, the label asked radio stations in a letter dated April 21 across the United States to "cooperate in its marketing plan and refrain[ed] from airing the record until Thursday, April 30."

In the Billboard report, they compared the situation to when Los Angeles-based radio station KIIS-FM was sued by Warner Bros. Records for "popping" Prince's "Sign O' the Times", writing "the problem of stations going early on big records has become a major issue for labels. Houston's popularity and multiformat appeal make the issue all important to Arista."

In the same Billboard report, Steve Kingston, operations manager of the New York City radio station WHTZ New York, explained, "I think it's a positive step toward treating all stations fairly. Especially when you're talking about a Whitney Houston. If the record's destiny is in the hands of the mall or Federal Express, then one station gets it in a minute late and egos come into play."

Said a senior vice president of the label at the time, "[the] launching of the new Whitney Houston single is obviously of paramount importance to Arista... with anticipation running so high, it's crucial that no station in any format have, for any reason, an opportunity to jump the gun. Since it's impossible for us to deliver the single simultaneously to every station, this method seems the fairest way to serve both radio's needs and our own."

The same letter invited them to "join stations throughout the country in participating in the simultaneous radio release." It continued, "Your acceptance of the enclosed (versions of the single) shall be deemed to constitute your agreement with Arista Records to not play the song until April 30."

== Critical reception ==
Although it has since been regarded as one of the greatest songs of all time, "I Wanna Dance with Somebody (Who Loves Me)" received mixed reviews from critics upon its release in 1987.

Vince Aletti of Rolling Stone magazine, in a review of the album Whitney, criticized the song, commenting that "not taking any chances, the songwriters [Merill Griffith and Shannon Rubicam] have simply come up with a clever anagram of their original hit [How Will I Know], and [Narada Michael] Walden has glossed it over in an identically perky style. The strategy is not so different from that behind Hollywood's blockbuster sequels: this is 'How Will I Know II'."

Los Angeles Times's pop music critic, Robert Hilburn described the song as "a deliciously raucous tune with a bit of the synthesizer underpinning and giddy zest of Cyndi Lauper's 'Girls Just Want to Have Fun'."

In his review of Whitney, Jon Pareles of The New York Times gave a negative comment, writing that listening to "I Wanna Dance with Somebody (Who Loves Me)" and "You're Still My Man," another track on the album was like "watching television while someone fiddles with color controls."

On its May 9, 1987, issue, Cashbox called the single "a spine-tingling danceable celebration that shines and glistens. [Houston's] remarkably sexy, supple voice floats atop this Walden production".

In 2006, Slant Magazine ranked the song at number 88 in their 100 Greatest Dance Songs, commenting that "with its parenthetical title, gummy bassline, schmaltzy horns, tinkling keyboards, and half-step key changes, [the song] is definitive '80s dance-pop." By 2020, the publication's staff had reranked it to number 58.

== Commercial performance ==
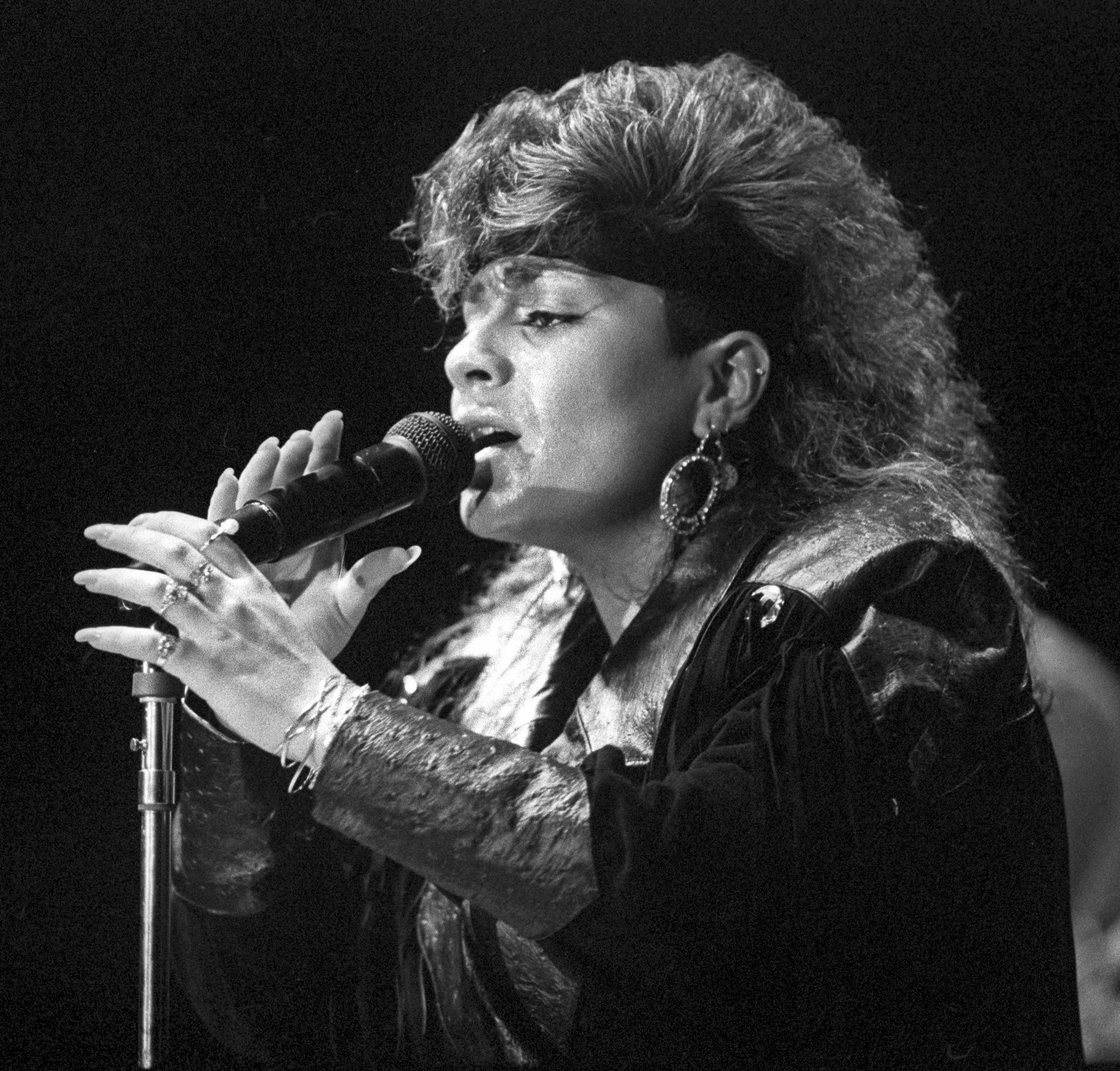
"I Wanna Dance with Somebody (Who Loves Me)" replaced Lisa Lisa and Cult Jam's "Head to Toe" at the top of both the Billboard and Cashbox pop singles charts in the United States.

=== North America ===
"I Wanna Dance with Somebody (Who Loves Me)" was released as the first single from Houston's second album on April 27, 1987. It entered the Billboard Hot 100, the issue dated May 16, 1987, at number 38, the "Hot Shot Debut" of the week and her highest single chart debut at the time. It was also the highest single debut since Madonna's "Dress You Up" debuted at number 36 in August 1985. On June 6, it entered the top ten after just four weeks, making it Houston's fastest-rising single at the time, beating her previous hit, "Greatest Love of All".

On June 27, it reached the top spot of the chart, replacing American freestyle act Lisa Lisa and Cult Jam's "Head to Toe", and becoming Houston's fourth number-one single in the United States, the issue date of June 27, 1987 ― the same day that Houston's album Whitney debuted at atop the Billboard 200 (known at the time as "Top Pop Albums") the first time ever by a female artist. Houston also became the first female artist since Donna Summer in 1979 to simultaneously hit number one on the Billboard Hot 100 and Billboard 200 multiple times, having done it the previous year in May 1986 with her self-titled debut and "Greatest Love of All".

It spent two weeks atop the charts and was displaced by the song "Alone" by American rock band Heart on July 11, 1987. It spent a total of eighteen weeks on the chart in its initial run, including fourteen weeks in the top 40 and nine weeks inside the top 10, the most weeks inside the top ten of any single released in 1987. With the song topping the Billboard Hot 100, Houston became the first female artist to send four consecutive number one singles on the chart.

The song reached number 1 on the Hot 100 Single Sales chart for two weeks, and on the Hot 100 Airplay chart for three weeks, her longest run at that time. The single also peaked at number 1 on the Hot Adult Contemporary and the remixed dance / club version by Steve Thompson and Michael Barbiero became Houston's first chart-topper on the Billboard Hot Dance/Club Play Songs, staying on the top position of the charts for three weeks and two weeks, respectively. In addition, it reached a peak of two on the Billboard Hot R&B/Hip-Hop Songs chart (known then as "Hot Black Singles"), the issue date of July 4, 1987. It remained at that position for two weeks, behind "I Feel Good All Over" by Stephanie Mills (which never appeared on the Hot 100 at all), and spent 15 weeks on the R&B chart. Paul Grein of Billboard noted the success of the song on the adult contemporary and R&B charts despite its accessible dance-pop sound "dramatizes how solidly entrenched Houston is and underscores her mass appeal".

On the rival Cash Box charts, the song repeated its Billboard success, topping its Top 100 Singles chart on July 4, 1987, also unseating "Head to Toe" there. For the June 27 issue, it peaked at number two on its Top 12" Dance Singles chart and peaked at number three for two weeks on its Black Contemporary Singles chart in the same week it topped the Top 100 Singles chart.

On July 28, 1987, the single was certified Gold by the Recording Industry Association of America (RIAA), for shipment of 1,000,000 copies of the single, and re-certified Platinum, making it Houston's first single to achieve that feat, for the same shipment on February 13, 1989, with the change of the RIAA certification criteria for singles. (Note: The number of sales required to qualify for Gold and Platinum discs was higher prior to January 1, 1989. The thresholds were 1,000,000 units (Gold) and 2,000,000 units (Platinum), reflecting a decrease in sales of singles.) On June 25, 2025, the song was certified eight-times Platinum in the United States by the RIAA for sales of eight million copies, and is her second highest-certified single after "I Will Always Love You". A year later, on August 19, 2026, days after the release of a Barbie doll replicating her look from the song's music video on what would've been her 63rd birthday and the release of the compilation album, WH1TNEY, the song was certified nine times Platinum in the US for sales of nine million copies alone in the country.

It placed at number four on the Billboard Year-End Top Pop Singles chart for 1987 and number two on the Cash Box Year-End Top 50 Pop Singles chart.

In Canada, the song debuted at 74 on the RPM Top 100 Singles chart, the issue dated May 9, 1987, and reached the top of the chart on July 4, 1987. The track became Houston's third consecutive number-one single in the country and her fifth consecutive top-ten single. It was ranked second on the RPM Year-End Top 100 Singles chart for 1987. The single was later certified Gold by the Canadian Recording Industry Association (CRIA) on February 29, 1988.

In 1995, dance producer and remixer Junior Vasquez remixed the song and released it under the title "I Wanna Dance with Somebody (Junior's Happy Handbag Remix)". A year later, Houston included the remix in her CD single for her 1996 hit, "Why Does It Hurt So Bad". In August 1996, the song was popular enough in the US to make the Billboard Hot Dance Club Play chart, where it peaked at number 11 on September 28, 1996. This mix was later featured on Houston's first compilation, Whitney: The Greatest Hits (2000).

=== Europe ===
In Europe, it became Houston's most successful single to date at the time.

The song debuted at number 10 on the UK Singles Chart, the week ending date of May 23, 1987. Two weeks later, it reached number one on the chart, the week ending June 6, 1987, becoming her second UK number-one single, replacing "Nothing's Gonna Stop Us Now" by the rock band Starship. It would spend two weeks at the top, spending eight weeks in the top ten. The single was certified Gold by the British Phonographic Industry (BPI) on August 1, 1987, for shipments of 400,000 copies, and it finished the year as the third-best-selling song of 1987 in the UK. According to The Official Charts Company, by 2012, it had sold 760,000 copies in the United Kingdom and was the first number 1 hit to be released with a CD single in the UK. As of 2025, the single has been certified quintuple-platinum for combined digital sales and song stream equivalent units of over 3 million copies, making it Houston's highest-certified single in the United Kingdom.

The single also topped the singles chart in Belgium for three weeks, the Netherlands for four weeks, Germany for five weeks, Denmark for four weeks, Italy for a week, Norway for seven weeks, Sweden for six weeks and Switzerland for six weeks, and peaked at number 3 in Austria and number 2 in Ireland. This popularity of the single across Europe led to the song topping the European Hot 100 Singles chart for eight weeks.

=== Oceania and South Africa ===
It became Houston's second number 1 single on the Australian Kent Music Report chart, staying at the top for five weeks. The song also peaked at number 1 on the New Zealand Singles Chart and remained there for four weeks, making it Houston's first number 1 single in the country. It also topped the charts in South Africa, becoming her first number one single in that region.

=== Posthumous chart revival ===
Following Houston's death in 2012, the song reappeared on major charts internationally. On the Billboard Hot 100, for the week of February 25, 2012, it re-entered the chart at number 35, her second highest entry after "I Will Always Love You" re-entered at number 7, helping Houston to become one of the few artists to land in the top 40 on the Billboard Hot 100 for four decades or more. It was her first top 40 entries on the Hot 100 since "The Star Spangled Banner" reappeared on the chart in October 2001.

The following week, the song reached number 25, resulting in the song accumulating 20 cumulative weeks in total. With "Greatest Love of All" reaching number 36 and "I Will Always Love You" reaching number 3, it made Houston the first posthumous artist to land three top 40 singles simultaneously on the Billboard Hot 100; only Prince would have more upon his own death four years later.

In the United Kingdom, the song returned to the top 40 of that chart at number 20 for the week ending February 25, her second highest entry after "I Will Always Love You", which reached number 14. Twelve of Houston's songs in total re-entered the charts, resulting in a UK chart record for the singer in achieving the most simultaneous hits on the UK singles chart by a female artist, earning a Guinness World Record. According to Brian Grant, director of the song's popular music video, upon the UK receiving the news of Houston's death, he heard the song on the radio "nearly every hour in Britain". Since 2022, it has re-entered the UK singles chart seven times including six times inside the top 75, usually after New Year's Day.

On July 10, 2023, the song amassed one billion audio streams on Spotify, the first of Houston's songs to do so. Houston was only the second female artist to reach this feat with a 1980s single after Kate Bush's "Running Up That Hill" and was the first female artist established in the 1980s to have a song amassing a billion streams on the platform. Billboard reported in 2023 that the song "still rake[d] in over two million official on-demand U.S. streams per week", according to Luminate. "I Wanna Dance with Somebody (Who Loves Me)" has sold over 18 million copies worldwide and has been certified in thirteen countries. As a result, it's the highest-certified 1980s single by a female artist worldwide as well as the best-selling single by a female artist released in that decade.

== Music video ==
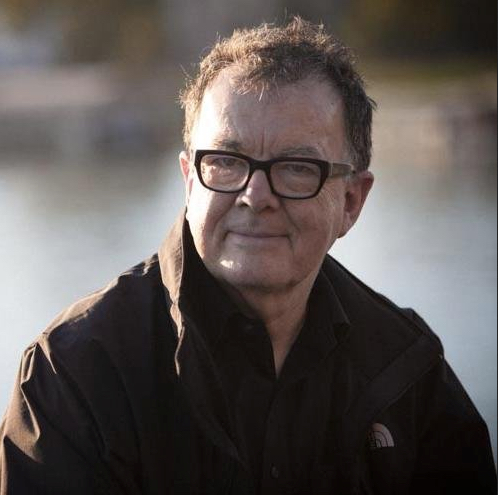
Director Brian Grant directed the music video to "I Wanna Dance with Somebody (Who Loves Me)".

=== Production ===
The music video for "I Wanna Dance with Somebody (Who Loves Me)" was initially filmed at New York City in March 1987. For the video, British director Brian Grant, who had previously worked with Houston on the music video to "How Will I Know" in London two years prior, was hired to direct. British choreographer Arlene Phillips, who provided choreography for "How Will I Know" was rehired to provide choreography for the video. Because Houston wasn't known for being a dancer, Grant and Phillips decided to surround Houston with agile male dancers, while also giving Houston minimal choreography steps in a couple of scenes.

Most of the video features Houston in a purple dress and a continuous shot of a purple backdrop that never changes its angle of vision. According to Grant in 2023, Clive Davis wasn't satisfied with the initial production of the music video, urging for a "more dream-like version", in which scenes of Houston ending her performance and daydreaming of the "proper pop video" were added. Grant assumed the reason for the added scenes was due to "the flak Davis was receiving for making Houston’s image 'too white.'"

=== Synopsis ===
The video starts off with Houston having finished a performance onstage at the Rose d'Or in Montreux in a black and white setting. As she walks backstage afterwards, the scene is intercut with more vivid, colorful images of her as she begins daydreaming.

The song then explodes into its beginning, with myriad locations and various outfits by Houston, as dancers trying to impress her as she dances; in between these scenes, the black and white scene of Houston daydreaming backstage would occasionally show up. Towards the end of the song she manhandles a guy, who has a mixture of a look of shock and surprise asking him "Don't you wanna dance, say you wanna dance".

At the very end, back in its black and white setting, Houston gets out of her limousine and upon spotting the same men who were in her daydreams entering a club called "Misteblu's", soon rushes to join them, ending the video. Misteblu was the name of one of Houston's cats.

=== Release and reaction ===
The music video made its official world premiere on MTV on May 30, 1987, just weeks after the single was released, debuting in heavy rotation. It also played on heavy rotation on BET and VH1 and other subsequent music video stations and shows such as Night Tracks. The music video topped the Cash Box Music Video Charts for three weeks, starting in the week of July 18, 1987.

The video was nominated for Best Video of the Year at the 1988 Soul Train Music Awards and won Best Music Video at the Garden State Music Awards in Atlantic City, New Jersey.

In June 2022, the video was remastered in 4K resolution to celebrate the 35th anniversary of the release of the Whitney album and has accumulated over 582 million views as of November 2026 on YouTube; it is her fourth most viewed video on the platform.

In their Houston obituary in 2012, The Advocate stated "[Houston's] infectious smile and bubbling charisma" in the video was "a time capsule of a good time in the 1980s."

== Live performances ==
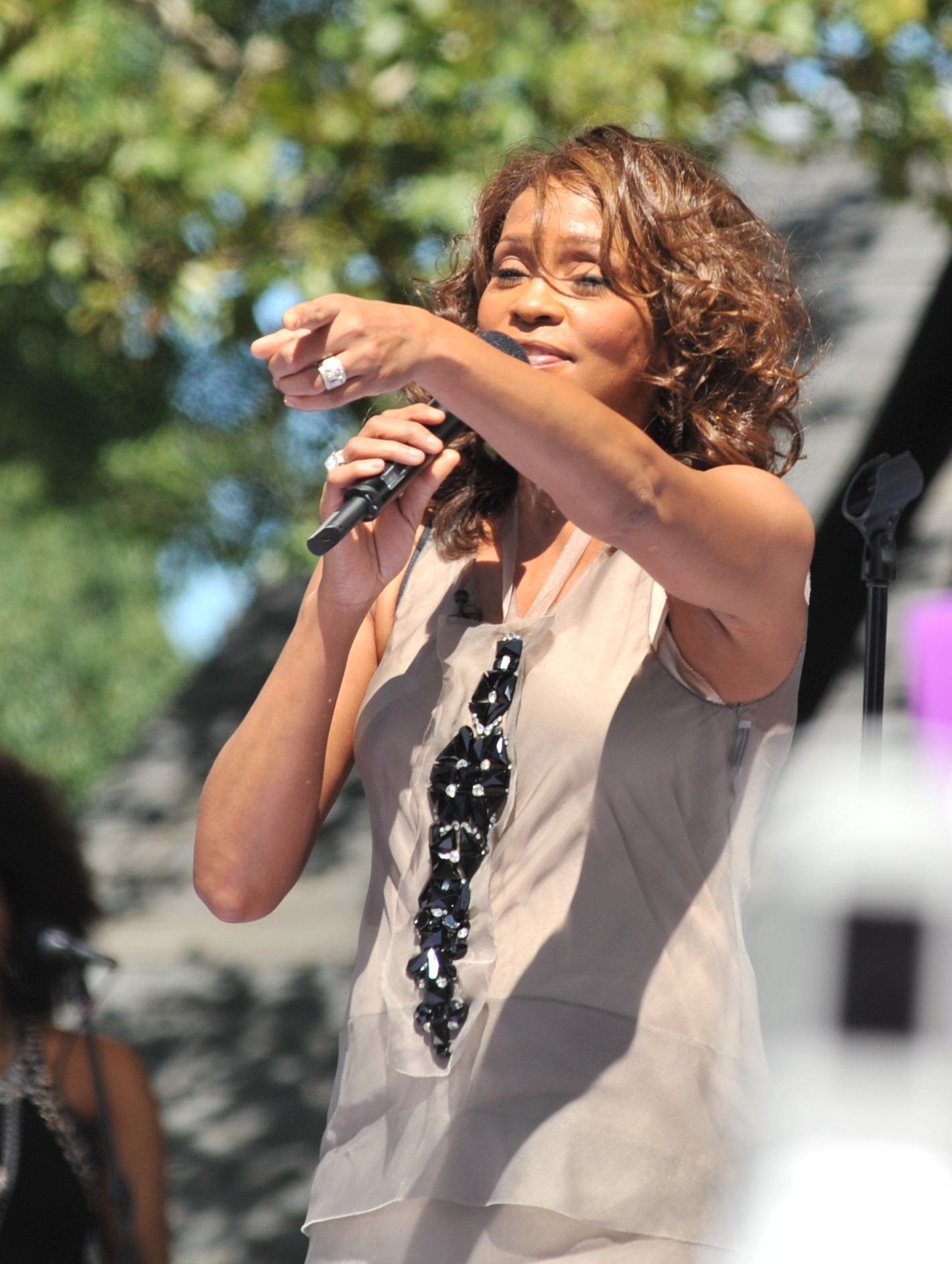
Houston (pictured performing for Good Morning America in 2009) gave high spirited performances of "I Wanna Dance with Somebody (Who Loves Me)" throughout her career.

Houston performed the song on almost all of her world and regional tours. She premiered its usage at the Asbury Park Convention Hall in Asbury Park, New Jersey on July 24, 1986, two days before the start of The Greatest Love World Tour that same month, before its official release of the following year, introducing the song, along with "Didn't We Almost Have It All", as new tunes from her upcoming album. During her European promotion for the Whitney album from April–May 1987, Houston performed the song on various television series such as Domenica In (an Italian entertainment programme), the Montreux Golden Rose Rock Festival: IM&MC Gala (May 15, 1987), and Top of the Pops (May 21, 1987).

Houston's Moment of Truth World Tour in 1987–88 had her performing it as the finale song of the tour, usually following her performance of "Greatest Love of All". She performed it without back-up dancers on the North American leg (1987), and with four dancers on the European, Australian and Asian legs of the tour (1988). Two different performances of the song were recorded in Saratoga Springs, New York on September 2, 1987, and at Wembley Arena in London, United Kingdom in May 1988; the first was broadcast on MTV, during the 4th MTV Video Music Awards on September 11, 1987. The second was taken from one night of nine sold-out Wembley Arena concerts, aired by Italian channel Rai Uno on a special program for her in 1988. On March 2, 1988, Houston opened the night of the 30th Annual Grammy Awards performing the song. During the European leg of the tour, she participated in the Nelson Mandela 70th Birthday Tribute Concert and performed the song in front of about 72,000 people at Wembley Stadium on June 11, 1988.

Houston also performed "I Wanna Dance with Somebody (Who Loves Me)" as part of her set on the fourteen-date Feels So Right Tour in Japan. One performance of the song on the tour was recorded at Yokohama Arena on January 7, 1990, and later broadcast on Japanese television.

On March 17 of that year, she sang the song live on That's What Friends Are For: Arista Records 15th Anniversary AIDS Benefit Concert, televised on CBS on April 17, 1990. According to Billboard, her performance of the song was seen as a defiance against critics who had complained of Houston's crossover success, opining that "choosing to perform 'Somebody' was intentional. Instead of teasing the new jack swing-informed sound of her forthcoming I'm Your Baby Tonight (1990), a performance of 'Somebody' cemented the song as bigger and more powerful than any discourse around it." Clive Davis himself stated that the performance was "a unique demonstration of why [Whitney] was the greatest contemporary singer we have ever experienced in music... It was the most affecting of any of them, the most exhilarating and awesome performance of that song. She took Radio City by storm, the audience screamed for her, she was just raising the level higher than they could have ever imagined." This performance was included in the 2014 CD/DVD release, Whitney Houston Live: Her Greatest Performances.

In 1991, Houston opened her I'm Your Baby Tonight World Tour with "I Wanna Dance with Somebody (Who Loves Me)". Three different performances of the song were taped and broadcast: the first was in Yokohama, Japan on March 15 and the second was in Norfolk, Virginia, the concert itself entitled Welcome Home Heroes, televised live on HBO on March 31 and later released as the video of the same name; the third was in A Coruña, Spain on September 29, broadcast on a Spanish television channel and later featured on the select set-list on This Is My Life, her first hour-long special which aired on ABC, May 6, 1992.

"I Wanna Dance with Somebody (Who Loves Me)" was also performed during The Bodyguard World Tour (1993–94). On the tour, five different performances of the song were recorded and televised; four were on the South American leg of the tour in 1994 ― Brazil, Chile, Argentina and Venezuela ― and one was in Johannesburg, South Africa, broadcast live via satellite on HBO on November 12, 1994, the concert itself entitled The Concert for a New South Africa. Houston opened her 25-minute pregame performance at the 1994 FIFA World Cup Final at Rose Bowl in Pasadena, California with the song, broadcast in more than 180 countries on July 17, 1994.

"I Wanna Dance with Somebody (Who Loves Me)" was included in the set-list on two regional tours, The Pacific Rim Tour (1997) and The European Tour (1998). During the My Love Is Your Love World Tour of 1999, the remix version of the song was performed as a part of '1980s Dance Medley' along with "How Will I Know". One performance of the song on the tour was recorded in Sopot, Poland and broadcast live on Polish channel TVP1 on August 22, 1999. In 2000, Houston performed the song as a similar version to that of her '99 tour at Arista Records 25th Anniversary Celebration, recorded at Shrine Auditorium in Los Angeles on April 10, and broadcast on May 15 on NBC. In November 2009, during promotion of her comeback album, I Look to You, Houston performed the song along with "Million Dollar Bill" on the season finale of Dancing With the Stars. Houston also performed the song throughout her final world tour, the Nothing but Love World Tour (2009-2010).

== Legacy and cultural impact ==
=== Impact and influence ===
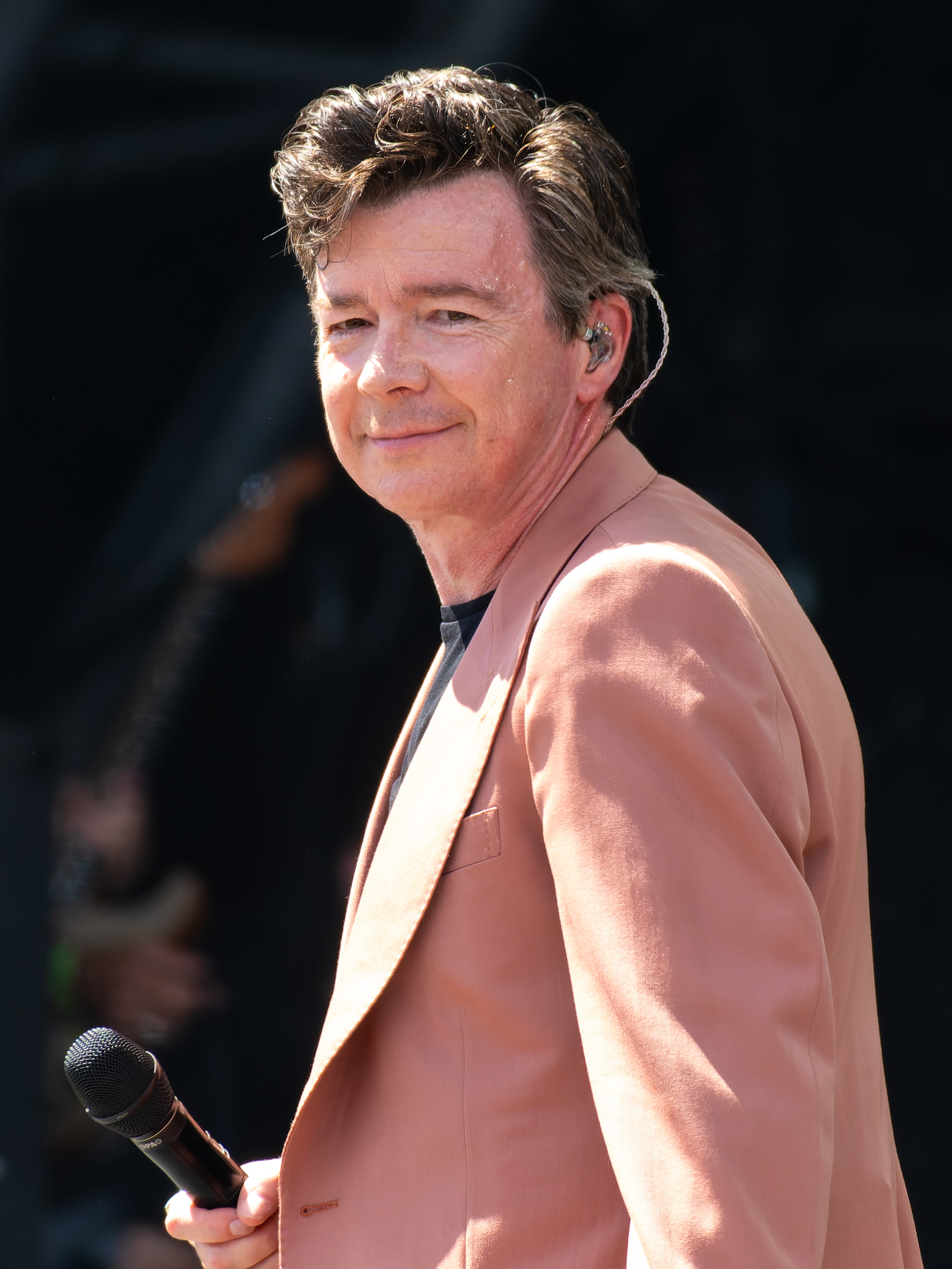
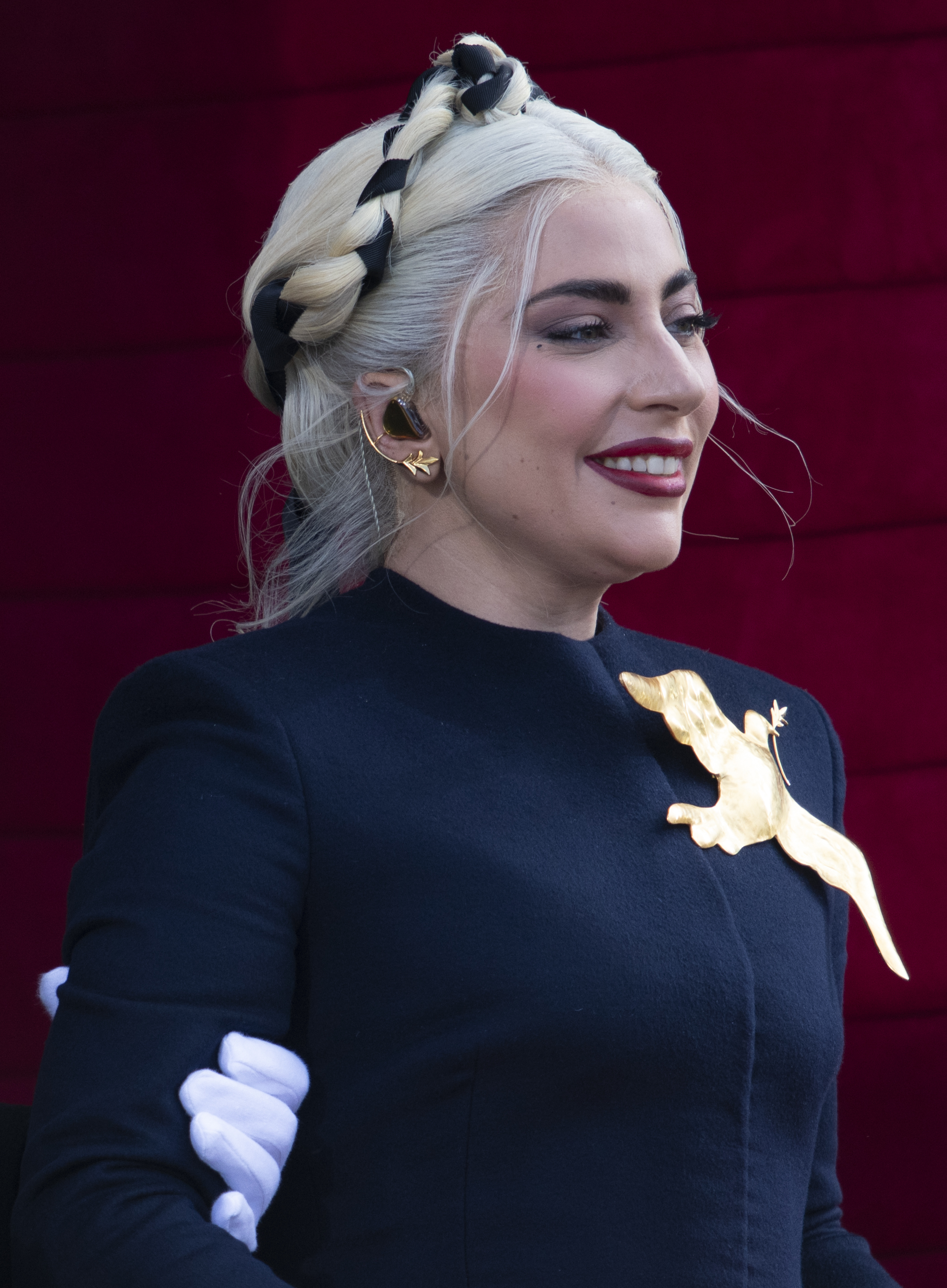
Musicians Rick Astley (left) and Lady Gaga (right) based their respective songs "She Wants to Dance with Me" and "Fashion of His Love" after "I Wanna Dance with Somebody (Who Loves Me)".

According to Billboard, "I Wanna Dance with Somebody (Who Loves Me)" remains "one of the most seminal pop songs in history, catapult[ing] Houston to an even higher level of pop stardom." Said Rickey Minor, "It just opened up a whole new era of music."

The songwriters Merrill and Rubicam claimed the song's impact was due to its emotional need for love, opining "everybody wants that feeling of connection", citing events as disparate as New York City Pride parades and mid-lockdown Italian nights amid the peak of the COVID-19 pandemic as "moments where they’ve seen the song give people the solace they’re searching for."

In 2012, singer Christina Aguilera recalled first seeing Houston in the music video to the song stating, "I was instantly drawn. She represented a female who was strong and had a strong voice, and that appealed to me as a young girl."

In their list of what they considered the seven best modulations in pop music history in September 2016, Billboard included "I Wanna Dance with Somebody (Who Loves Me)", writing "Consider the key change Whitney’s way of giving listeners permission to turn the moves up a notch after giving them a nice little warm-up to coax them out of their shells."

In 2026, Jack Walters of Men's Journal opined that the song was "ahead of its time with its disco/R&B influences and poppy, energetic production" and that with the song's success, Houston proved that "artists can be both commercially viable and creatively impressive without sacrificing one for the other—a trait that contemporary critics struggled to appreciate."

Rick Astley claimed he wrote his 1988 top ten hit, "She Wants to Dance with Me", in the style of "I Wanna Dance with Somebody", to win the confidence of his producer Pete Waterman, who was a huge fan of Houston's.

American singer Lady Gaga's 2011 track, "Fashion of His Love", a track from the special edition of her second studio album, Born This Way, was compared to "I Wanna Dance with Somebody (Who Loves Me)" in terms of its retro late 1980s synthesized pop sound, Gaga's soulful vocals and a similar key change.

American indie pop band Sub-Radio did a parodied version of the song titled "I Don't Wanna Dance with Nobody", which the site Upworthy called "the personal theme song by introverts everywhere".

Houston's look from the music video has also been immortalized several times. In 2013, a year after her death, Houston received four different wax statues from different eras of her career by Madame Tussaud in London, with the "I Wanna Dance with Somebody" look and outfit being one of the four and showcased at its Las Vegas headquarters. In 2022, Funko released a miniature figurine of Houston in her look from the music video on what would've been her 59th birthday, one of four Houston looks immortalized by Funko through its pop music collection. In 2026 on what would've been her 63rd birthday, Mattel released their official Barbie doll of Houston in her look from the music video nearly 40 years after the video originally aired.

=== Accolades and achievements ===
"I Wanna Dance with Somebody (Who Loves Me)" won the award for "Favorite Pop/Rock Single" at the 15th American Music Awards on January 25, 1988. Additionally, Houston won the Grammy for "Best Pop Vocal Performance, Female" with the song at its 30th ceremony on March 2, 1988, where she received a total of three nominations. The music video for the song was nominated for "Best Music Video" at the 2nd Soul Train Music Awards on March 30, 1988. Houston won the award for "Best Music Video" for the video at the 1st Garden State Music Awards. The song was ranked the 4th biggest song of 1987 by Billboard magazine and the 2nd biggest song of 1987 by Cashbox magazine. In addition, the song was inducted into the Official Charts Company's Pop Gem Hall of Fame, ranked the 80th song in their list.

The song has been considered a staple at weddings. According to the New York Post, the song was considered the top wedding song in a 2024 poll. In the article, it reported that through the app Breezit, the song appeared 484 times across over 2,000 wedding-themed Spotify playlists, accounting for 24% for wedding nuptials, outdoing other wedding staples, including ABBA's "Dancing Queen" and Usher's "Yeah!".

=== As a gay anthem ===
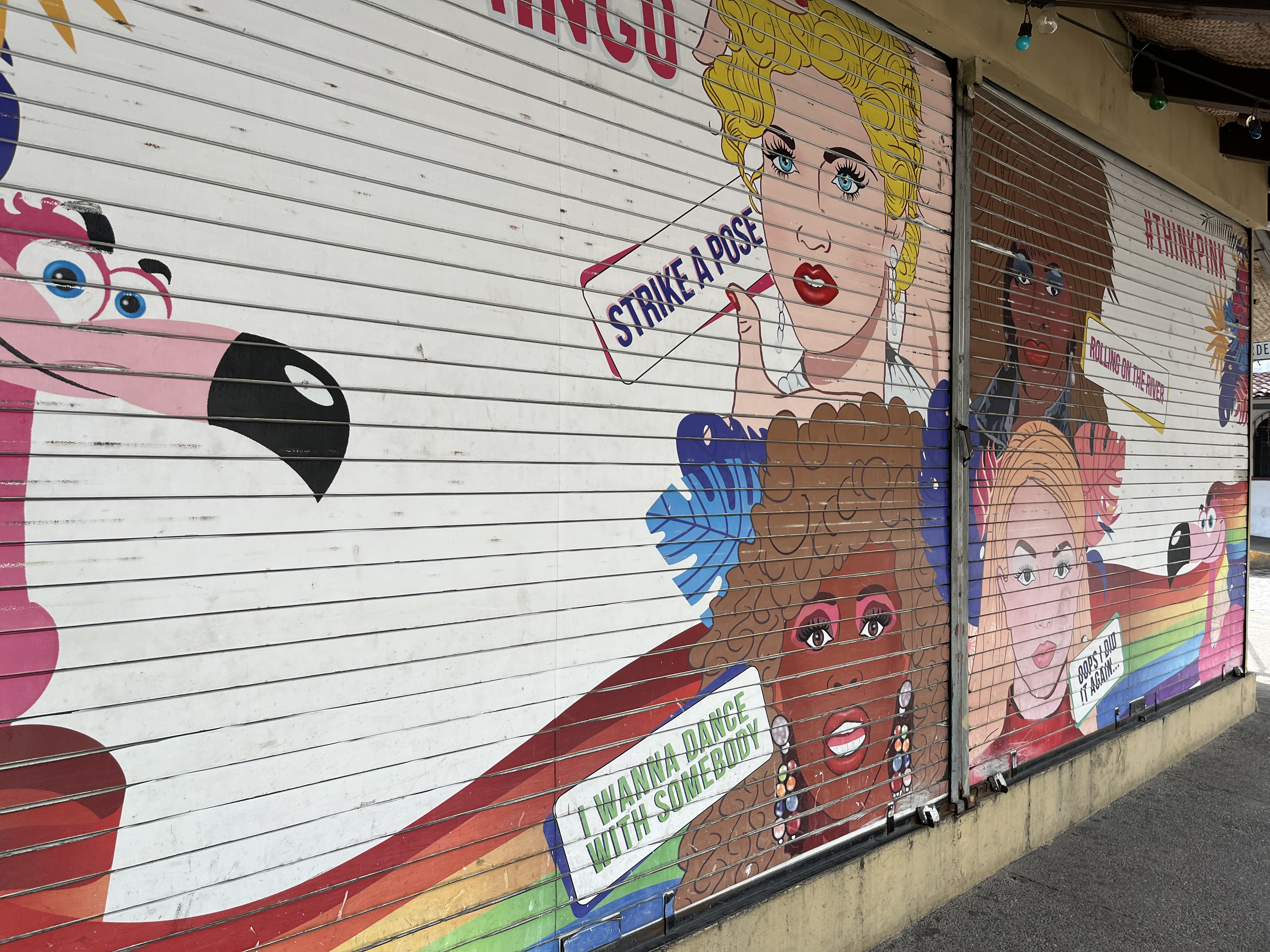
A Pride mural featuring Houston and her look from the "I Wanna Dance with Somebody (Who Loves Me)" music video among other LGBTQ icons is shown in Puerto Vallarta.

Since its release in 1987, the song has been cited as a gay anthem by several media outlets and gay organizations.

In their 2018 article on Houston's iconic status in the LGBTQ community, Billboard wrote how the song was "a queer anthem that has spanned decades".

In 2019, LA Weekly ranked the song as the ninth best LGBTQ anthem of the 1980s and 1990s, tied with another Houston gay anthem, "It's Not Right but It's Okay", writing that the song "really struck a cord [sic] with the LGBTQ community during the peak of the AIDS epidemic, when many felt isolated and alone. Also, the gender neutrality of the song made that somebody relatable to everybody, no matter who you wanted to dance with."

In 2021, BuzzFeed included the song as one of 69 songs that were "certified gay anthems". A year later, the same publication named the song among 75 songs that could be considered the "gay national anthem". The American Institute of Bisexuality stated the song "stands as a subtle bi anthem — a euphoric yet yearning ode to being seen by someone you love. Its legacy cements it as a radiant milestone for bi representation in pop music."

The song has been covered by several openly gay artists such as Aiden James, Matt Alber, Scott Matthew, Claybourne Elder and Ty Herndon.

In celebration of Australia legalizing same-sex marriage in the country, New Zealand singer Lorde covered the song while onstage in Sydney holding up the Pride flag.

The website, Drag Society, included the song in their "Top 13 anthems we're keeping on repeat this Pride Month" list in 2023, mentioning the song's "message about wanting to dance freely and publicly with the person you love meant was something that the gay community understood all too well amid a time when homosexuality was still largely taboo."

The song played a pivotal part in a scene from the gay coming-of-age film, Love, Simon (2018). The song was featured on the film's official soundtrack. It also was featured in an episode of the LGBTQ-themed series, Pose.

In 2020, DJ Rotten Robbie named the song as one of the "top 25 Pride anthems of all time" in the Chicago Tribune.

During London Pride in July 2022, the cast of the show Heartstopper, including the show's stars Joe Locke and Kit Connor, performed the song to drown out a small anti-LGBT protest group.

In 2023, Seventeen ranked it the 29th best gay anthem out of 60.

In 2026, during Pride Month, Spotify released its playlist of the most added songs on Pride-related playlists and announced that "I Wanna Dance with Somebody" was the fourth most added song, only bested by "Born This Way" by Lady Gaga, "I'm Coming Out" by Diana Ross and "Believe" by Cher.

Houston herself was ranked the seventh top artist on Pride Spotify playlists alongside Madonna, Lady Gaga, Diana Ross, Britney Spears and Beyoncé among others.

=== Rankings ===
In 2012, in a reverse of its initial review, Rolling Stone called the song "Houston's dance-pop masterpiece", ranking the song the third best Whitney Houston song of all time from its reader's poll. Forbes ranked it the second best Whitney Houston song behind "I Will Always Love You". On the week of her induction into the Rock and Roll Hall of Fame, Billboard ranked it Whitney's best song ever. BET ranked the song fourth place among 40 of the singer's best songs. MTV listed the song as one of her top ten songs shortly after her death in 2012. The Guardian ranked the song as Houston's second greatest song behind "I Have Nothing". In October 2014, the musical instrument insurer Musicguard carried out a survey determining "I Wanna Dance with Somebody (Who Loves Me)" to be the United Kingdom's fourth favorite "floorfiller" behind "Twist and Shout" by the Beatles, "Billie Jean" by Michael Jackson and "Dancing Queen" by ABBA.

In 2015 the song was voted by the British public as the nation's fifth favorite 1980s number 1 single in a poll conducted by ITV. That same year, Time Out ranked it the seventh greatest party song ever. Also in 2015, Rod Couch ranked it the 179th greatest song of the rock era, her third-ranked song out of six Houston songs on Couch's book, The Top 500 Songs of the Rock Era 1955-2015. In 2005, Bruce Pollock included the song in his book of The 7,500 Most Important Songs of the Rock and Roll Era 1944-2000.

In 2016, Adam Theisen of The Michigan Daily deemed the song "the greatest song of all time". In 2017, the online publication Consequence ranked it the third greatest song of 1987 behind "Man in the Mirror" by Michael Jackson and "Where the Streets Have No Name" by U2, calling it a "career-defining tune". In 2020, The Guardian ranked the song No. 29 in their list of "The 100 Greatest UK No. 1s". In that same year, Daily Mirror ranked the song No. 25 in their "Top 50 Happiest Songs Ever" list. In 2021, Rolling Stone ranked "I Wanna Dance with Somebody (Who Loves Me)" at number 231 on their updated list of the 500 Greatest Songs of All Time. That same year, Cleveland.com ranked it the 4th greatest number one hit of the 1980s. The following year in 2022, the song was ranked 70th place among the 100 greatest Rock and Roll Hall of Fame songs of all time by the same publication. In 2023, Billboard ranked the song number one on their list of the 500 Best Pop Songs of All Time. That same year, American Songwriter ranked the song as the most iconic song of the 1980s. Two years later, in 2025, the same site ranked it number one on its "3 Pop Songs from 1987 That We Can't Live Without Today" list, topping "Never Gonna Give You Up" by Rick Astley and "Smooth Criminal" by Michael Jackson.

Time Out ranked the song seventh place in its list of "The 45 Best Karaoke Songs Ever Made", writing that the song "remains an invigorating blast of lovelorn pop glory, her powerful, agile voice soaring effortlessly over spritely synths and funk-syncopated guitar" and that the song's theme of "achingly lonely search for a dance floor soulmate sound like the best Friday night ever. Of course, nobody’s alone at karaoke. Especially if you nail that third-act key change." In 2025, Screen Rant ranked the song twice in two lists, ranking it the seventh most defining song of the 1980s and in another list as the most defining pop song of the genre.

Awards and nominations
Organization	Year	Award	Result	Ref.
American Music Awards	1988	Favorite Pop/Rock Single	Won	
Billboard Year-End Awards	1987	Top Pop Singles	4th place	
Billboard Year-End Awards	1987	Top Black Singles	Included	
Billboard Year-End Awards	1987	Top Dance Sales 12-Inch Singles	Included	
Billboard Year-End Awards	1987	Top Dance Club Play Singles	Included	
Billboard Year-End Awards	1987	Top Adult Contemporary Singles	Included	
Cash Box Awards	1987	Top 100 Pop Singles	2nd place	
Cash Box Awards	1987	Top Black/Contemporary Singles	Included	
Garden State Music Awards	1988	Best Music Video	Won	
Grammy Awards	1988	Best Pop Vocal Performance, Female	Won	
Music & Media Year-End Awards	1987	Single of the Year	Won	
Official Charts Pop Gem Hall of Fame	2014	Hall of Fame Inductee No. 80	Inducted	
Radio & Records	1987	CHR Record of the Year	Won	
Soul Train Music Awards	1988	Best Music Video	Nominated	

Critic lists
Publisher/critic	Year	Listicle	Rank	Ref.
American Songwriter	2023	The Most Iconic Song of the 1980s	1	
Billboard	2021	Greatest of All Time Songs of the Summer	104	
Billboard	2022	The 100 Greatest Karaoke Songs of All Time	22	
Billboard	2023	The 500 Best Pop Songs of All Time	1	
Blender	2005	500 Greatest Songs Since You Were Born	275	
Cosmopolitan	2023	61 Best '80s Songs That Are, Like, Totally Bitchin'	13	
Forbes	2025	50 Timeless '80s Songs That Defined a Generation	15	
Glamour	2021	51 Best '80s Songs That Stand the Test of Time	Placed	
The Guardian	2020	The 100 greatest UK No 1s	29	
L.A. Weekly	2014	The 20 Best Pop Songs in History by Women Artists	4	
Pitchfork	2015	The 200 Best Songs of the 1980s	20	
Rolling Stone	2019	20 Biggest Songs of the Summer: The 1980s	8	
Rolling Stone	2021	The 500 Greatest Songs of All Time	231	
Screen Rant	2025	10 Songs That Completely Define the 1980s	7	
Screen Rant	2025	10 Pop Songs That Completely Define The Genre	1	
Slant Magazine	2006	100 Greatest Dance Songs	88	
Slant Magazine	2020	100 Greatest Dance Songs	58	
Time Out	2023	The 45 Best Karaoke Songs Ever Made	7	
VH1	2000	VH1's 100 Greatest Dance Songs in Rock & Roll	86	

=== Covers, samples and usage in media ===
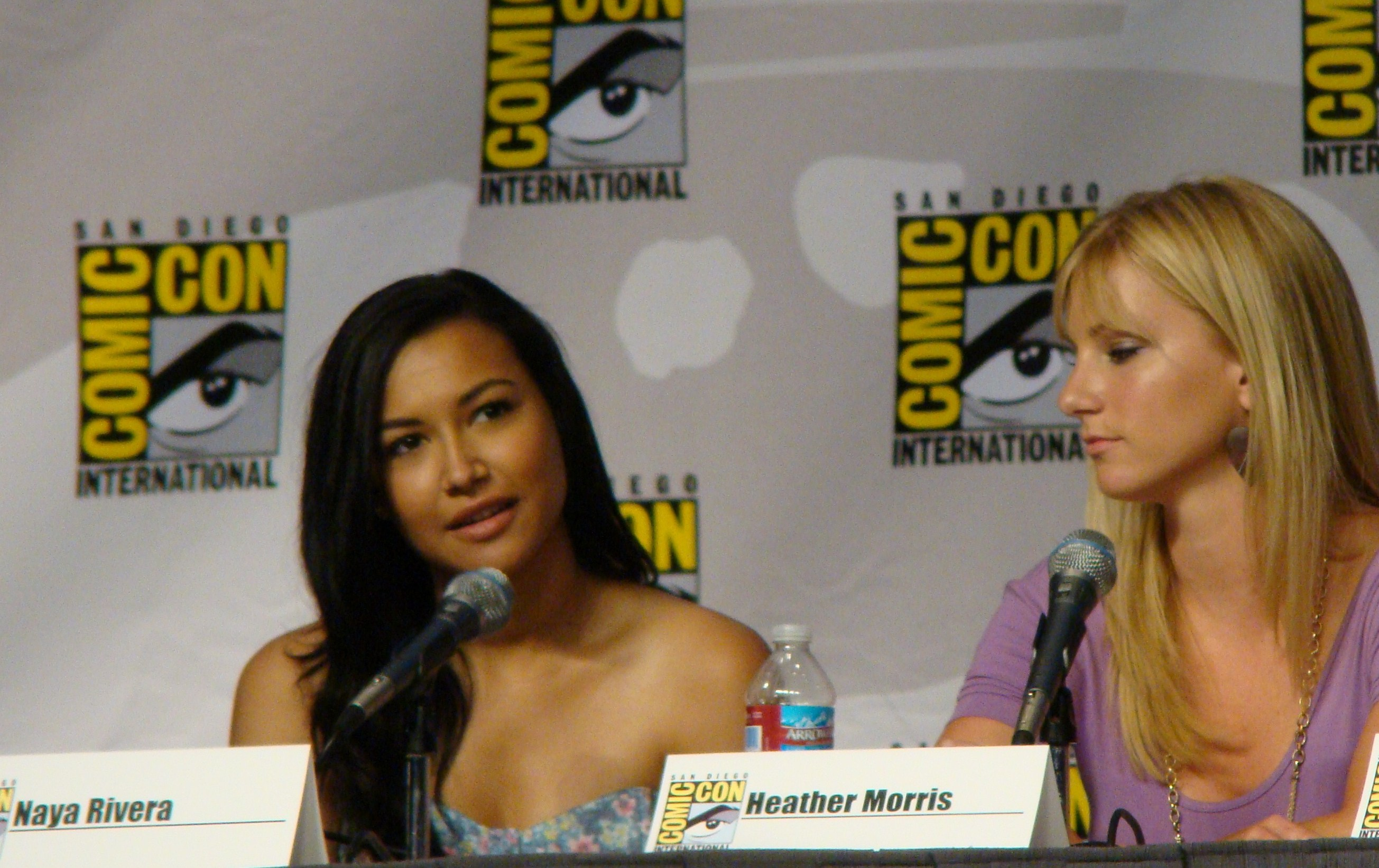
Glee stars Naya Rivera and Heather Morris covered the song on the show's Houston tribute episode, "Dance with Somebody" in 2012.

The song is Houston's most covered and sampled song in her catalog. Among its most prominent covers include versions from Fall Out Boy, Jessie J, David Byrne, and Evanescence. In addition, the song has charted twice in the UK by other artists who covered it, including the electronic music duo Flip & Fill, whose 2003 version reached a peak of thirteen on the official UK pop singles chart at number 13 and Morgan Harper-Jones, whose 2023 slower, folk inflected version reached number 97 on the same chart.

For their tribute episode to Houston, "Dance with Somebody", Glee cast mates Naya Rivera and Heather Morris covered the song. In that portion of the episode, references to Houston's video for this song as well as the video for "How Will I Know" were used. The song charted inside the Canadian Hot 100 in 2012.

The song was sampled by Bebe Rexha and rapper Lil Wayne for their single "The Way I Are (Dance With Somebody)", on the song "Dance!" by singer Lumidee and hip-hop artist Fatman Scoop, by singer Natalie La Rose for her "Somebody" featuring Jeremih, and by country artist Thomas Rhett for his "Don't Wanna Dance", which interpolated the song's chorus.

In 2019, the English rock band Sleep Token made a cover of the song for the deluxe edition of their debut album Sundowning.

Houston and the song's impact was referenced in the 2022 Pink hit, "Never Gonna Not Dance Again".

In 2024, English indie pop band Blossoms released a cover of the song for the deluxe edition of their fifth album Gary.

On September 11, 2025, singer Calum Scott officially released a reimagined duet ballad version of the song with Houston, which was featured on his album, Avenoir.

The song has been featured in several television shows and films over the years. The song has been played in films such as Love, Simon, 13 Going on 30, Like Father, Pokemon: Detective Pikachu, Earthquake Bird, Isn't It Romantic?, Hillbilly Elegy, King Richard, Dancing Queens and Prom Pact and, besides Glee, has been featured in television shows such as RuPaul's Drag Race, City on Fire, Ghosts, The Big Leap, Pose, Gossip Girl, Moonshine, The Hills, Shameless, Succession and The Circle.

It has also been frequently covered on talent shows such as American Idol, The X Factor, The Voice and The Masked Singer.

The song was covered by Marius de Vries for the film, Strange Magic, in 2015.

The song's title was used for the full title of the Houston estate-approved biopic, Whitney Houston: I Wanna Dance with Somebody, with British actress Naomi Ackie, playing Houston. In the film, the concept of the song is first brought to Houston by Davis (Stanley Tucci) at his Manhattan office. Upon recording and releasing the song as a single, it becomes an international hit and Ackie reenacts Houston's 1990 performance of the song at the That's What Friends Are For: Arista 15th Anniversary Concert special, demonstrating the song's success and Houston's transformation into a crossover superstar. The film was a success in the box office, generating $61.5 million in the international box office and peaking at number one on US Netflix and also charting well on Netflix in other countries including the second spot in the UK.

On the fourth season of the American TV series, Industry in the episode, "Dear Henry", which aired in February 2026, the song is sung by Max Minghella as his character, businessman Whitney Halberstam, during a tense phone call with Harper Stern (Myha'la). Said Minghella, "When I read that in the script, I was probably the most excited of anything for Whitney, because I just thought it was genius and so to my taste... When you unlock something like that, the magic of it being a Whitney track, and having the Halberstram/Patrick Bateman of it all, and then the lyrics themselves all coalescing in that way, it’s kind of a miracle moment. So I felt very grateful that I got to do it, and kind of amazed that they came up with it."

At the 2026 Met Gala, Canadian-American singer-actor Joshua Henry opened its proceedings by performing the song on its steps. Henry was backed by a 12-person choir, eight dancers, and a four-piece band with choreography from Ellenore Scott and musical production from Joseph Abate. Vogue claimed the performance "set a high watermark for the thrilling evening to come." In November 2026, during the final stop of her Stages tour at Nashville's Ryman Auditorium, American country artist Lauren Alaina performed the song as a duet with fellow American country artist Emily Ann Roberts.

== Track listing and formats ==
- US 12-inch vinyl single (Version 1)
1. "I Wanna Dance with Somebody (Who Loves Me)" (12-inch Remix) – 8:33
2. "I Wanna Dance with Somebody (Who Loves Me)" (Single version) – 4:52
3. "I Wanna Dance with Somebody (Who Loves Me)" (12-inch Remix Radio edit) – 4:51
4. "I Wanna Dance with Somebody (Who Loves Me)" (Dub Mix) – 6:48
5. "I Wanna Dance with Somebody (Who Loves Me)" (A cappella) – 5:18
- US 12-inch vinyl single (Version 2)
1. "I Wanna Dance with Somebody (Who Loves Me)" (12-inch Remix) – 8:33
2. "I Wanna Dance with Somebody (Who Loves Me)" (Single version) – 4:52
3. "I Wanna Dance with Somebody (Who Loves Me)" (Dub Mix) – 6:48
4. "I Wanna Dance with Somebody (Who Loves Me)" (A cappella Mix) – 5:18
5. "Moment of Truth" – 4:38
- UK 7-inch vinyl single
1. "I Wanna Dance with Somebody (Who Loves Me)" – 4:52
2. "Moment of Truth" – 4:39
- UK promo VHS single
1. "I Wanna Dance with Somebody (Who Loves Me)" (Music Video) – 5:15
- UK 5-inch CD maxi-single
1. "I Wanna Dance with Somebody (Who Loves Me)" (12-inch Remix) – 8:32
2. "Moment of Truth" – 4:36
3. "I Wanna Dance with Somebody (Who Loves Me)" (Dub Mix) – 6:48
- US 5-inch CD maxi-single promo
1. "I Wanna Dance with Somebody (Who Loves Me)" (Single version) – 4:52
2. "I Wanna Dance with Somebody (Who Loves Me)" (12-inch Remix Radio edit) – 4:51
3. "I Wanna Dance with Somebody (Who Loves Me)" (12-inch Remix) – 8:36

== Credits and personnel ==
- Whitney Houston – lead vocals, vocal arrangement, background vocals
- George Merrill – writer
- Shannon Rubicam – writer
- Narada Michael Walden – producer, arranger, drums
- Walter "Baby Love" Afanasieff – synths
- Randy "The King" Jackson – bass synth
- Corrado Rustici – guitar synth
- Preston "Tiger Head" Glass – percussion programming
- Marc Russo – alto sax
- Greg "Gigi" Gonaway – Simmons
- Sterling Smith – synth horns
- Jim Gilstrap – background vocals
- Karen "Kitty Beethoven" Brewington – background vocals
- Kevin Dorsey – background vocals
- Myrna Matthews – background vocals
- Jennifer Hall – background vocals
- David Fraser – recording, mixing
- Dana Jon Chappelle – assistant engineer
- Lincoln Clapp – additional engineer
- Gordon Lyon – additional engineer, additional assistant engineer
- Jay Rifkin – additional engineer
- Ken Kessie – additional engineer
- Maureen Droney – additional engineer
- Stuart Hirotsu – additional assistant engineer
- Paul "Goatee" Hamingson – additional assistant engineer
- Noah Baron – additional assistant engineer
- Bill "Sweet Wil liam" Miranda – additional assistant engineer
- Ross Williams – additional assistant engineer
- Rob Beaton – additional assistant engineer

== Charts ==
=== Weekly charts ===
Chart (1987-1989)	Peak position
Australia (Kent Music Report)	1
Austria (Ö3 Austria Top 40)	3
Belgium (Ultratop 50 Flanders)	1
Belgium (VRT Top 30)	1
Canada Top Singles (RPM)	1
Canada Retail Singles (The Record)	1
Denmark (IFPI)	1
European Hot 100 Singles (Music & Media)	1
Finland (Suomen virallinen lista)	1
France (SNEP)	15
Greece (IFPI)	1
Iceland (RÚV)	3
Ireland (IRMA)	2
Italy (Musica e dischi)	1
Italy Airplay (Music & Media)	7
Luxembourg (Radio Luxembourg)	2
Netherlands (Dutch Top 40)	1
Netherlands (Single Top 100)	1
New Zealand (Recorded Music NZ)	1
Norway (VG-lista)	1
Paraguay (UPI)	9
Quebec (ADISQ)	1
South Africa (Springbok Radio)	1
Spain (AFYVE)	1
Sweden (Sverigetopplistan)	1
Switzerland (Schweizer Hitparade)	1
UK Singles (Official Charts)	1
US Billboard Hot 100	1
US Adult Contemporary (Billboard)	1
US Hot Black Singles (Billboard)	2
US Crossover Top 30 (Billboard)	1
US Dance Club Songs (Billboard)	1
US Dance Singles Sales (Billboard)	4
Venezuela (UPI)	7
West Germany (GfK)	1

Chart (1996)	Peak position
US Dance Club Songs (Billboard) Junior's Happy Handbag Remix	11

Chart (2012–2013)	Peak position
Australia (ARIA)	25
Austria (Ö3 Austria Top 40)	70
Canada Hot 100 (Billboard)	33
France (SNEP)	31
Ireland (IRMA)	32
Israel International Airplay (Media Forest)	7
Japan Hot 100 (Billboard)	58
Netherlands (Single Top 100)	42
New Zealand (Recorded Music NZ)	17
Scottish Singles Sales (Official Charts)	18
Slovenia Airplay (SloTop50)	17
South Korea International (Gaon)	193
Spain (Promusicae)	28
Switzerland (Schweizer Hitparade)	28
UK Singles (Official Charts)	20
UK Dance (Official Charts)	8
US Billboard Hot 100	25

Chart (2017–2023)	Peak position
Finland Airplay (Radiosoittolista)	79
Global 200 (Billboard) P2J Remix	190
Ireland (IRMA)	70
Japan Hot Overseas (Billboard Japan)	10
Poland Airplay (ZPAV)	47
South Africa Airplay (RISA)	38
Sweden (Sverigetopplistan)	54
UK Singles (Official Charts)	70
US R&B Digital Song Sales (Billboard) P2J Remix	6
US R&B/Hip-Hop Digital Song Sales (Billboard) P2J Remix	11

Chart (2024)	Peak position
Sweden (Sverigetopplistan)	45
UK Singles (Official Charts)	72

Chart (2025–2026)	Peak position
Netherlands Airplay (Dutch Charts)	38
Poland (Polish Airplay Top 100)	50
Sweden (Sverigetopplistan)	68
UK Singles (Official Charts)	99

=== Year-end charts ===
Chart (1987)	Position
Australia (Australian Music Report)	11
Austria (Ö3 Austria Top 40)	14
Belgium (Ultratop)	2
Canada Top Singles (RPM)	2
European Hot 100 Singles (Music & Media)	2
Finland (Suomen virallinen lista)	4
Netherlands (Dutch Top 40)	3
Netherlands (Single Top 100)	4
New Zealand (RIANZ)	9
Norway Spring Period (VG-lista)	4
South Africa (Springbok Radio)	4
Switzerland (Schweizer Hitparade)	3
UK Singles (OCC)	3
US Billboard Hot 100	4
US 12-inch Singles Sales (Billboard)	24
US Adult Contemporary (Billboard)	9
US Dance Club Play (Billboard)	14
US Hot Black Singles (Billboard)	24
US Hot Crossover Singles (Billboard)	4
US Top 50 Singles (Cash Box)	2
US Top 50 Black Contemporary Singles (Cash Box)	14
West Germany (Media Control)	5

Chart (2025)	Position
Poland (Polish Airplay Top 100)	89

=== Decade-end charts ===
Chart (1980–1989)	Position
Netherlands (Dutch Top 40)	43
UK Singles (OCC)	81

== Certifications and sales ==
Region	Certification	Certified units/sales
Australia (ARIA)	8× Platinum	560,000^{‡}
Brazil (Pro-Música Brasil)	Gold	30,000^{‡}
Canada (Music Canada)	Gold	50,000^{^}
Denmark (IFPI Danmark)	3× Platinum	270,000^{‡}
France (SNEP) 2017 release	Gold	100,000^{‡}
Germany (BVMI)	Platinum	600,000^{‡}
Italy (FIMI)	Platinum	70,000^{‡}
Netherlands (NVPI)	Gold	75,000^{^}
New Zealand (RMNZ)	7× Platinum	210,000^{‡}
Spain (Promusicae)	Platinum	60,000^{‡}
Sweden (GLF)	Gold	25,000^{^}
United Kingdom (BPI) Physical single	Gold	598,000
United Kingdom (BPI) Digital single	5× Platinum	3,000,000^{‡}
United States (RIAA)	9× Platinum	9,000,000^{‡}
Summaries
Worldwide	—	18,000,000
^{^} Shipments figures based on certification alone.^{‡} Sales+streaming figures based on certification alone.

== These Kids Wear Crowns version ==
"I Wanna Dance with Somebody"

Single by These Kids Wear Crowns

from the album Jumpstart
- Released: June 27, 2011
- Length: 2:56
- Label: EMI Canada/Capitol
- Songwriters: George Merrill; Shannon Rubicam
- Producers: These Kids Wear Crowns; Garth Richardson

These Kids Wear Crowns singles chronology
"Jumpstart" (2011)	"I Wanna Dance with Somebody" (2011)	"Love This City" (2014)

Music video
- "I Wanna Dance with Somebody" on YouTube

Canadian pop rock band These Kids Wear Crowns covered the song and released it on June 27, 2011, as the third single from their debut studio album, Jumpstart. Their version was produced by the band and Garth Richardson. The song peaked at No. 30 on the Canadian Hot 100 and was certified Gold by Music Canada. It also reached No. 51 on the Australian Singles Chart.

A French version featuring Brigitte Boisjoli titled "I Wanna Dance with Somebody (Danser Toute la Nuit)" and a Spanish version featuring Eiza González titled "I Wanna Dance with Somebody (Quiero Bailar Esta Noche)" were also released. In November 2011, it was released as a single in Australia.

Singer Alexander Johnson described their composition of the cover as "kind of spur of the moment." According to him, bassist and vocalist Alan Poettcker thought of an idea for the song and decided to run with it, which interested their label, who thought "sounded good enough" and wanted to see if the band "could do it."

The music video was released on June 27, 2011, and was directed by Colin Minihan. It was nominated at the 2012 MuchMusic Video Awards for Post-Production of the Year.

=== Track listing ===
Digital download
No.	Title	Length
1.	"I Wanna Dance with Somebody" (CHR mix)	2:56

Digital download – French version
No.	Title	Length
1.	"I Wanna Dance with Somebody" (Danser Toute la Nuit) (feat. Brigitte Boisjoli)	2:56

Digital download – Spanish version
No.	Title	Length
1.	"I Wanna Dance with Somebody" (Quiero Bailar Esta Noche) (feat. Eiza González)	2:56

=== Weekly charts ===
Weekly chart performance for "I Wanna Dance with Somebody"
Chart (2011)	Peak position
Australia (ARIA)	51
Canada (Canadian Hot 100)	30
Canada AC (Billboard)	49
Canada CHR/Top 40 (Billboard)	14
Canada Hot AC (Billboard)	41

==== Year-end chart ====
Year-end chart performance for "I Wanna Dance with Somebody"
Chart (2011)	Position
Canada (Canadian Hot 100)	95

==== Certifications ====
Certifications for "I Wanna Dance with Somebody"
Region	Certification	Certified units/sales
Canada (Music Canada)	Gold	40,000^{*}
^{*} Sales figures based on certification alone.

== See also ==
- List of best-selling singles
- List of number-one singles in Australia in 1987
- List of Top 25 singles for 1987 in Australia
- Nummer 1-hits in de BRT Top 30 in 1987
- List of RPM number-one singles of 1987
- Dutch Top 40 number-one hits of 1987
- List of European number-one hits of 1987
- List of number-one hits of 1987 (Finland) (in Finnish)
- Number-one hits of 1987 (Germany)
- List of number-one hits of 1987 (Italy)
- List of number-one singles in 1987 (New Zealand)
- List of number-one hits 1987 (Norway)
- List of Swedish number-one hits
- List of number-one hits of 1987 (Switzerland)
- List of number-one singles from the 1980s (UK)
- List of Billboard Hot 100 number-one singles of 1987
- List of number-one adult contemporary singles of 1987 (U.S.)
- List of number-one dance singles of 1987 (U.S.)

== Bibliography ==
- Walden, Narada Michael (2012). Whitney Houston: The Voice, The Music, The Inspiration. Insight Editions. ISBN 978-1-608-87200-8.
- Seal, Richard (1994). One Moment in Time: Whitney Houston. Britannia Press Publishing. ISBN 0-9519937-8-X.
