= Jumpstart (album) =

Studio album by These Kids Wear Crowns
- Released: March 1, 2011
- Length: 35:34
- Label: EMI Canada/Capitol
- Producers: These Kids Wear Crowns; Garth Richardson; Matt Squire; Geoff Rockwell

These Kids Wear Crowns chronology
These Kids Wear Crowns (2010)	Jumpstart (2011)	Still Having Fun (2015)

Singles from Jumpstart
- 1. "Break It Up" Released: August 17, 2010; 2. "Jumpstart" Released: January 31, 2011; 3. "I Wanna Dance with Somebody" Released: June 27, 2011

Jumpstart is the debut studio album by Canadian pop rock band These Kids Wear Crowns. It was released on March 1, 2011, via EMI Canada/Capitol. The album includes the singles "Break It Up" and "Jumpstart", as well as a cover of Whitney Houston's "I Wanna Dance with Somebody", which was also released as a single. The latter two songs were certified Gold by Music Canada.

An iTunes bonus track edition of the album was released on January 1, 2012, which features two new versions of "I Wanna Dance with Somebody", a French version featuring Brigitte Boisjoli and a Spanish version featuring Eiza González.

In support of the album, the band embarked on their headlining True North Strong and Free Tour in the spring of 2011. The group also toured overseas, performing at festivals in Australia and Singapore.

== Background ==
In August 2010, the band announced they were working on their first album with producers Garth Richardson and Matt Squire. Recording began that month and took place at NRG Studios in Hollywood, California, SKYlab in Fort Worth, Texas, SOMD Studios and The Lair in Los Angeles, The Armoury Studios in Vancouver, British Columbia, The Farm Studios in Gibsons, British Columbia, and The Sound Suite in Abbotsford, British Columbia. Some songs featured on their self-titled EP, released earlier, were re-worked and remastered. Most of the tracks were written by singer Alex Johnson and bassist Alan Poettcker, with the exception of "Skeletons" and "Let's Ride", the two wrote it alongside guitarist Joshua McDaniel, "Jumpstart" written by Squire, Damon Sharpe and Pebe Sebert, "Lifetime" written by Poettcker, Johnson, McDaniel, Squire and Travis Huff, and "I Wanna Dance with Somebody" written by Shannon Rubicam and George Merrill.

On the recording process of their first album, Johnson said, "It was fun, it was confusing, it was trying, it was the first time we had ever worked with anyone outside of the band as well. We were kind of just a bunch of yes men for a few things, not that I think that came out bad, because there is nobody out there who wants to write bad music [...] I can't remember who it was but there's a great quote 'you never finish a song, you just abandon it.' That's so true as you can never really get that song to how you hear it in your head and if you try to get it exactly as you want to hear it, you'll just drive yourself mad! You have to just kind of abandon a song at a certain point and say there, I'm content with this."

== Release and promotion ==
On February 10, 2011, the band announced their debut album, Jumpstart for release on March 1, along with revealing the album art. In support of the album, the band headlined their True North Strong and Free Tour in April 2011, in Western Canada. The band also toured the rest of the country in March and April, with support from Fefe Dobson. On April 3, the album was released in Japan. In May 2011, These Kids Wear Crowns performed in Singapore at Music Matters alongside Simple Plan. On July 19, the album was re-released, which included a French version of "I Wanna Dance with Somebody" featuring Brigitte Boisjoli. In November 2011, These Kids Wear Crowns toured Australia. In December, the group returned to Singapore to perform at the 2012 Marina Bay Countdown.

On January 1, 2012, an iTunes bonus track edition of the album was released, featuring the Spanish version of "I Wanna Dance with Somebody" featuring Eiza González, as well as the previously released French version. In February 2012, the band supported Simple Plan on their Get On Your Heart! Tour in Canada, alongside All Time Low and Marianas Trench. In February and March, they performed at the Soundwave Festival in Australia, joining Cobra Starship, Forever the Sickest Kids and Kill Hannah.

== Singles ==
On August 17, 2010, "Break It Up" was released as the album's lead single. A music video for the single premiered the following day, via MuchMusic. The song peaked at number 60 on the Canadian Hot 100. On January 31, 2011, "Jumpstart" was released as the second single from the album. The music video for the song was released on March 7. It reached number 44 on the Canadian Hot 100. The song also charted on the Canada CHR/Top 40 Airplay and Canada Hot AC Airplay charts at numbers 19 and 35, respectively. The song was certified Gold by Music Canada. The song also performed particularly well in Australia, peaking at number 17 and was certified 2× Platinum by the Australian Recording Industry Association. On June 27, their cover of "I Wanna Dance with Somebody" was released as the third single from the album. The song peaked number 30 on the Canadian Hot 100. It also reached number 14 on the Canada CHR/Top 40 Airplay chart and number 41 on the Canada Hot AC Airplay chart. It was certified Gold by Music Canada.

"Lifetime" was released as the album's first promotional single on November 24, 2011, for digital download. A music video for the song also premiered via MuchMusic. On February 7, 2012, "This Party Never Stops" was released digitally as the album's second promotional single.

== Critical reception ==
Mikiko Oyabu of Geki Rock wrote a positive review, remarking, "Starting with their debut single 'Break It Up', their songs are composed of fast-paced, happy tunes, and their ever-changing, colorful expressions will surely bring a smile to your face. A must-listen for anyone who can't wait for spring to arrive."

== Track listing ==
All tracks are written by Alan Poettcker and Alex Johnson, except where noted.

Standard edition
No.	Title	Writer(s)	Length
1.	"Skeletons"	Alan Poettcker; Alex Johnson; Joshua McDaniel	3:12
2.	"This Party Never Stops"		2:58
3.	"Jumpstart"	Matt Squire; Damon Sharpe; Pebe Sebert	3:28
4.	"Lifetime"	Poettcker; Johnson; McDaniel; Squire; Travis Huff	3:49
5.	"Break It Up"		3:00
6.	"Good Friends (with Bad Benefits)"		2:45
7.	"I Wanna Dance with Somebody"	Shannon Rubicam; George Merrill	2:56
8.	"Oceans"		3:52
9.	"Don't Sweat It"		3:18
10.	"Let's Ride"	Poettcker; Johnson; McDaniel	3:05
11.	"We All Fall Down"		3:11
Total length:			35:34

French bonus track edition
No.	Title	Length
12.	"I Wanna Dance with Somebody" (Danser Toute la Nuit) (feat. Brigitte Boisjoli)	2:57
Total length:		38:31

iTunes bonus track edition
No.	Title	Length
7.	"I Wanna Dance with Somebody" (CHR mix)	2:56
8.	"Oceans"	3:52
9.	"Don't Sweat It"	3:18
10.	"Let's Ride"	3:05
11.	"We All Fall Down"	3:11
12.	"I Wanna Dance with Somebody" (Danser Toute la Nuit) (feat. Brigitte Boisjoli)	2:57
13.	"I Wanna Dance with Somebody" (Quiero Bailar Esta Noche) (feat. Eiza González)	2:56
Total length:		41:27

== Personnel ==
Credits for Jumpstart adapted from the album's liner notes.

These Kids Wear Crowns

- Alex Johnson – lead vocals
- Alan Poettcker – bass guitar, vocals
- Matt Vink – keyboards, backing vocals
- Joshua "Gypsy" McDaniel – guitar, backing vocals
- Josh Mitchinson – drums
- Joe Porter – guitar, backing vocals

Production

- These Kids Wear Crowns – producer (2, 7–8), additional producer (1, 5–6, 9–11)
- Matt Squire – producer (1, 3–4), engineer (1, 4), mixing (2–3), programming (1)
- Geoff Rockwell – producer (5–6, 9–10), engineer (5, 9–10)
- Garth Richardson – producer (7, 11), additional producer (9–10), engineer (7, 9–11)
- Mark Needham – mixing (1–2, 4–11), additional producer (8)
- Stephen Marcussen – mastering (1–4, 6–11)
- Steve Hall – mastering (5)
- Travis Huff – additional producer (1, 4), engineer (1, 3–4)
- Steve Klassen – producer (8), engineer (2, 8), recording engineer (7, 9–11), vocal recording engineer (9–11)
- Ben Kaplan – engineer (7, 9–11)
- Darin Watson – recording engineer (5–6, 9–10), assistant engineer (5–6, 9–10), pro-tools
- Eric "E.J." Johnson – production assistant
- Jonathan Cook – management
- Chuck Quon – management
- Tommy Quon – management
- Dave Delnea – photography
- Fraser Hill – A&R
- Jason Furman – booking
- Josh Mitchinson – art direction
- Michelle Holtzkener – art direction

== Charts ==
Chart performance for Jumpstart
Chart (2011)	Peak position
Canadian Albums (Billboard)	31

== Release history ==
Release history and formats for Jumpstart
Region	Date	Edition	Format	Label	Ref.
Canada	March 1, 2011	Standard	CD; digital download	EMI Canada/Capitol	
Various	March 1, 2011	Standard	Digital download	EMI Canada/Capitol	
Japan	April 3, 2011	Standard	CD	EMI Canada	
Various	July 19, 2011	French bonus track	CD; digital download	Capitol	
Various	January 1, 2012	iTunes bonus track	Digital download	EMI Canada/Capitol	
