= Big Wheels (Down with Webster song) =

Single by Down with Webster

from the album Time to Win, Vol. 2
- Released: September 9, 2011 (Radio); September 13, 2011 (Digital)
- Genre: Rap rock
- Length: 3:14
- Label: Universal Music Canada
- Songwriters: Tyler Armes; Patrick Gillett; Cameron Hunter; Andrew Martino; Martin Seja
- Producer: James Robertson

Down with Webster singles chronology
"She's Dope" (2011)	"Big Wheels" (2011)	"Royalty" (2012)

Music video
- "Big Wheels" on YouTube

"Big Wheels" is a single by Canadian rap rock band, Down with Webster. It is the second single from their second studio album, Time to Win, Vol. 2. The song was released to radio on September 9, 2011 and released for digital download on September 13, 2011. The song debuted on the Canadian Hot 100 at number 94, before reaching a peak of number 51.

== Background and recording ==
A 2:22 minute demo of Big Wheels was released in April 2009. A 3:14 minute version was re-recorded and released as the second single from Time to Win, Vol. 2. The newer version has a changed second verse and a bridge was added. A live version of the song was also featured in the band's iTunes Session.

== Music video ==
Down with Webster animated in 8-bit in the "Big Wheels" music video which features a floating cloud and the warp pipes from the Mario franchise

A music video for the song was filmed on August 14, 2011. The music video was directed by Aaron A, making it the fourth collaboration between Down with Webster and Aaron A. The music video premiere for "Big Wheels" was shown on September 19, 2011 on the MuchMusic show New.Music.Live. The music video has a retro 8-bit video game theme, and pays homage to the band members' childhood favourite video games including Paperboy, Duck Hunt, NBA Jam and the Super Mario series. The video peaked at #6 on the MuchMusic Countdown during the week of November 11, 2011. At the 2012 MuchMusic Video Awards, it won 'Post-Production of the Year'

== Chart performance ==
The song debuted on the Canadian Hot 100 at number 94 on the week of October 15, 2011. "Big Wheels" has peaked at number 51 on the week of November 19, 2011. It has spent a total of thirteen weeks on the chart. The song also reached number 23 and number 43 on the Canada CHR/Top 40 and Canada Hot AC airplay charts.

== Track listing ==
Digital download
No.	Title	Length
1.	"Big Wheels"	3:14

== Personnel ==
Credits for "Big Wheels" adapted from album's liner notes.

Down with Webster

- Patrick Gillett – vocals, guitar
- Cameron Hunter – rap vocals
- Martin Seja – rap vocals
- Tyler Armes – bass guitar, keyboards
- Andrew Martino – drums
- Dave Ferris – DJ

Production

- Down with Webster – producer
- James Robertson – producer, recording engineer
- Tom Lord-Alge – mixing
- Tom Coyne – mastering

== Charts ==
Chart performance for "Big Wheels"
Chart (2011)	Peak position
Canada (Canadian Hot 100)	51
Canada CHR/Top 40 (Billboard)	23
Canada Hot AC (Billboard)	43
