= MuchMusic Video Award for Best Watched Video =

The award for MuchMusic.com Most Watched Video is an award presented at the MuchMusic Video Awards. The award is presented to an artist whose music video had the most views on the MuchMusic website. The award was first handed out at the 2008 MuchMusic Video Awards.

== Winners ==
Year	Artist	Video
2008	Rihanna	"Umbrella"
2009	Girlicious	"Like Me"
2010	Young Artists for Haiti	"Wavin' Flag"
2011	Taio Cruz	"Dynamite
2012	Carly Rae Jepsen	"Call Me Maybe"
