= MuchMusic Video Award for Peoples Choice: Favourite Canadian Video =

Canadian video award

Peoples Choice: Favorite Canadian Video is an award presented at the MuchMusic Video Awards. The award was not presented after the 2000 MuchMusic Video Awards until the 2009 ceremony. During that period, the award show presented the awards for Peoples Choice: Favourite Canadian Group and Peoples Choice: Favourite Canadian Artist.

== Winners ==
Year	Artist	Video
1992	Slik Toxik	"White Lies, Black Truth"
1993	The Tragically Hip	"At the Hundredth Meridian"
1994	N/A	N/A
1995	The Tea Party	"The Bazaar"
1996	Alanis Morissette	"Ironic"
1997	Our Lady Peace	"Superman's Dead"
1998	Sarah McLachlan	"Sweet Surrender"
1999	Len	"Steal My Sunshine"
2000	Our Lady Peace	"One Man Army"
2009	Simple Plan	"Save You"
2010	Justin Bieber f. Ludacris	"Baby"
2011	Fefe Dobson	"Stuttering"
2012	Carly Rae Jepsen	"Call Me Maybe"
2013	Marianas Trench	"Stutter"
