= MuchMusic Video Award for Best Post-Production =

The following is a list of the MuchMusic Video Awards winners for Best Post-Production.

Year	Artist	Video
2000	Choclair	"Rubbin'"
2001	Our Lady Peace	"In Repair"
2002	David Usher	"Black Black Heart"
2003	Danko Jones	"Lovercall"
2004	Sam Roberts	"Hard Road"
2005	Death from Above 1979	"Romantic Rights"
2006	The Trews	"So She's Leaving"
2007	Sam Roberts	"Bridge to Nowhere"
2008	Sam Roberts	"Them Kids"
2009	Nickelback	"Gotta Be Somebody"
2010	Hedley	"Perfect"
2011	Danny Fernandes featuring Belly	"Automatic"
2012	Down with Webster	"Big Wheels"
2013	Billy Talent	"Surprise Surprise"
2014	City and Colour	"Thirst"
2015	Zeds Dead featuring Twin Shadow and D'Angelo Lacy	"Lost You"
2016	Majid Jordan	"Every Step Every Way"
2017	Sleepy Tom featuring Tonye	"Seeing Double"
