= 2012 MuchMusic Video Awards =

Annual edition of the awards show

- Date: June 17, 2012
- Location: 299 Queen Street West
- Country: Canada
- Hosted by: LMFAO
- Website: http://mmva.muchmusic.com

Television/radio coverage
- Network: MuchMusic; Fuse (US), 4Music (UK)

The 2012 MuchMusic Video Awards were held June 17, 2012 at MuchMusic's headquarters in Toronto, Canada. Katy Perry was the first performer announced. The award show was co-hosted by LMFAO.

== Nominees ==
Nominees for the People's Choice Awards were announced in early May 2012. One "wildcard" nominee was chosen in each of the "UR Fave" award categories (as voted by the Much Music viewers).

=== Video of the Year ===
- Carly Rae Jepsen - "Call Me Maybe"
- Justin Bieber - "Boyfriend"
- Drake - "Headlines"
- Hedley feat. P. Reign - "Invincible"
- Marianas Trench - "Fallout"

=== Post Production of the Year ===
- Down with Webster - "Big Wheels"
- Marianas Trench - "Fallout"
- Shaun Boothe - "Let Me Go"
- The New Cities - "Heatwave"
- These Kids Wear Crowns - "I Wanna Dance with Somebody"

=== Cinematographer of the Year ===
- Marianas Trench– "Fallout"
- City and Colour - "Fragile Bird"
- Hedley feat. P. Reign - "Invincible"
- Kreesha Turner - "Rock Paper Scissors"
- Shawn Desman - "Moneyshot"/"Something Stupid"

=== Director of the Year ===
- Danny Fernandes feat. Josh Ramsay & Belly – "Hit Me Up" Directed by Marc André Debruyne
- Aleesia feat. Big Sean – "Kiss It Bye Bye" Directed by RT!
- Down With Webster – "Royalty" Directed by Chris Wong
- Marianas Trench – "Haven't Had Enough" Directed by Kyle Davison
- Nelly Furtado – "Big Hoops" Directed by X

=== Pop Video of the Year ===
- Marianas Trench– "Haven't Had Enough"
- Anjulie - "Brand New Chick"
- Carly Rae Jepsen - "Call Me Maybe"
- Hedley ft. P. Reign - "Invincible"
- Victoria Duffield - "Shut Up and Dance"

=== MuchLOUD Rock Video of the Year ===
- The Sheepdogs– "I Don't Know"
- Arkells - "Michigan Left"
- F*cked Up - "Queen of Hearts"
- Sam Roberts Band - "I Feel You"
- Theory of a Deadman - "Chick Came Back"

=== MuchVIBE Hip-Hop Video of the Year ===
- Drake feat. Lil Wayne and Tyga – "The Motto"
- A-Game - "Cool Boyz"
- Classified feat. Kayo & Jim Cuddy - "The Hangover"
- Harvey Stripes feat. Lloyd - "Come On"
- K'naan ft. Nelly Furtado - "Is Anybody Out There"

=== MuchFACT Indie Video of the Year ===
- Arcade Fire - "Sprawl II (Mountains Beyond Mountains)"
- City and Colour - "Fragile Bird"
- Danny Fernandes feat. Josh Ramsay & Belly - "Hit Me Up"
- Down with Webster - "She's Dope"
- Lights - "Banner"

=== International Video of the Year - Artist ===
- Chris Brown feat. Justin Bieber - "Next 2 You"
- Beyoncé Knowles - "Run the World (Girls)"
- David Guetta feat. Nicki Minaj - "Turn Me On"
- Flo Rida - "Good Feeling"
- Katy Perry - "Last Friday Night (T.G.I.F.)"
- Lady Gaga - "Marry the Night"
- Nicki Minaj - "Starships"
- Kelly Clarkson - "Stronger (What Doesn't Kill You)"
- Pitbull feat. Ne-Yo, Afrojack & Nayer - "Give Me Everything"
- Rihanna feat. Calvin Harris - "We Found Love"

=== International Video of the Year - Group ===
- The Wanted - "Glad You Came"
- Bad Meets Evil feat. Bruno Mars - "Lighters"
- Cobra Starship feat. Sabi - "You Make Me Feel"
- Coldplay - "Paradise"
- Foster the People - "Houdini"
- Gym Class Heroes feat. Adam Levine - "Stereo Hearts"
- LMFAO - "Sexy and I Know It"
- Maroon 5 feat. Christina Aguilera - "Moves like Jagger"
- One Direction - "One Thing"
- Selena Gomez & The Scene - "Love You like a Love Song"

=== International Video of the Year by a Canadian ===
- Justin Bieber - "Boyfriend"
- Avril Lavigne - "Smile"
- Nickelback - "When We Stand Together"
- Simple Plan - "Astronaut"
- Drake feat. Rihanna - "Take Care"

=== Most Streamed Video of the Year ===
- Aleesia feat. Big Sean - "Kiss It Bye, Bye"
- Alyssa Reid - "The Game"
- Anjulie - "Brand New Chick"
- Beyoncé - "Countdown"
- Carly Rae Jepsen – "Call Me Maybe"
- Cobra Starship feat. Mac Miller - "Middle Finger"
- Danny Fernandes feat. Josh Ramsay & Belly - "Hit Me Up"
- Dev - "In the Dark"
- Foster The People - "Helena Beat"
- Gym Class Heroes ft. Adam Levine - "Stereo Hearts"
- Hedley - "One Life"
- Hedley feat. P. Reign - "Invincible"
- Jay-Z & Kanye West - "Otis"
- Kelly Clarkson - "Mr. Know It All"
- Lights - "Toes"
- LMFAO - "Sexy and I Know It"
- Marianas Trench - "Haven't Had Enough"
- Marianas Trench - "Fallout"
- Nickelback - "When We Stand Together"
- One Direction - "What Makes You Beautiful"
- Pitbull ft. Chris Brown - "International Love"
- Selena Gomez & The Scene - "Hit The Lights"
- Tyler Medeiros - "Say I Love You/Please Don't Go"
- Victoria Duffield - "Shut Up and Dance"

=== UR Fave: Video ===
- Carly Rae Jepsen - "Call Me Maybe"
- Drake - "Headlines"
- Hedley feat. P. Reign - "Invincible"
- Marianas Trench - "Fallout"
- Simple Plan feat. Sean Paul - "Summer Paradise"

=== UR Fave: International Artist or Group ===
- Katy Perry
- LMFAO
- One Direction
- Rihanna
- Adele (wildcard)

=== UR Fave: Artist or Group ===
- Drake
- Justin Bieber
- Carly Rae Jepsen
- Marianas Trench
- Hedley (Wildcard)

== Performers ==
=== Pre-show ===
- Kreesha Turner - "Love Again"

=== Main show ===
- LMFAO - "Party Rock Anthem", "Champagne Showers", "Sorry for Party Rocking", "Sexy and I Know It"
- Carly Rae Jepsen - "Call Me Maybe"
- Nelly Furtado - "Big Hoops (Bigger the Better)"
- Marianas Trench - "Fallout"
- Hedley - "Kiss You Inside Out"
- Ed Sheeran - "The A Team"
- Flo Rida - "Good Feeling" / "Wild Ones" with Carly Rae Jepsen
- Kelly Clarkson - "Dark Side" / "Stronger (What Doesn't Kill You)"
- Katy Perry - "Wide Awake"
- Justin Bieber - "All Around the World" / "Boyfriend"

== Appearances ==
- Conor Maynard
- Perez Hilton
- Lucy Hale
- Darren Criss
- Chord Overstreet
- Far East Movement
- Cody Simpson
- Jesse Metcalfe
- Down With Webster
- Victoria Duffield
- Kreesha Turner
- Munro Chambers
- Shawn Desman
- Dragonette
- Danny Fernandes
- LIGHTS
- Anjulie
- Shenae Grimes
- Rico Rodriguez
- These Kids Wear Crowns
- Selena Gomez
