= Go with the Show =

Go With the Show

Live album by Hedley
- Released: November 9, 2010
- Recorded: April 15, 2010 at Moncton Coliseum Arena (Moncton, New Brunswick), April 16, 2010 at Metro Centre (Halifax, Nova Scotia), April 20, 2010 at Mile One Arena (St. John's, Newfoundland)
- Genre: Alternative rock
- Length: 69:17
- Label: Universal Music Canada; Island Def Jam

Hedley chronology
The Show Must Go (2009)	Go With the Show (2010)	Storms (2011)

Go With the Show is the first live album to be released by the Canadian rock band Hedley. It was released on November 9, 2010, and contained the track "Beautiful", which in 2011 was released on Hedley's fourth studio album Storms. It debuted at #27 on the Canadian Albums Chart. The Live tracks were recorded at the three final destinations of the first leg of "The Show Must Go... on the Road Tour".

== Content ==
The live album DVD includes an exclusive documentary of the band's The Show Must Go... On The Road Tour as well as the music videos for "Cha-Ching", "Don't Talk to Strangers" and "Perfect". The DVD also includes a vignette opening for the documentary as well as a comedy skit called "Newsroom" and three jumbotron feeds for "Amazing" (in Moncton), "Beautiful" (in Halifax), and "Sweater Song" (in St. John's). The CD includes recordings from the Metro Centre in Halifax ("Cha Ching", "On My Own", "She's So Sorry", "Perfect", "Gunnin'", "Friends", "Beautiful" and "Never Too Late"), The Moncton Coliseum in Moncton ("Shelter", "Amazing", "Old School", "Hands Up", "321" and "For the Nights I Can't Remember") and the Mile One Arena in St. John's ("Don't Talk to Strangers", "Trip" and "Sweater Song").

== Track listing ==
No.	Title	Length
1.	"Cha-Ching"	3:37
2.	"On My Own"	3:13
3.	"She's So Sorry"	3:53
4.	"Shelter"	3:17
5.	"Perfect"	4:24
6.	"Amazing"	4:03
7.	"Old School"	4:10
8.	"Gunnin'"	4:16
9.	"Friends"	4:12
10.	"Beautiful"	3:28
11.	"Don't Talk to Strangers"	4:12
12.	"Hands Up"	4:18
13.	"321"	4:58
14.	"Never Too Late"	4:35
15.	"For the Nights I Can't Remember"	4:36
16.	"Trip"	4:44
17.	"Sweater Song"	6:01
Total length:		69:17

=== DVD track list ===
1. "The Show Must Go... on the Road Tour - Documentary"
2. "Special Features"
  - "Cha-Ching - Music video"
  - "Don't Talk to Strangers - Music video"
  - "Perfect - Music video"
  - "The Show Must Go... on the Road Tour - Vignette opening"
  - "Newsroom - Comedy skit"
  - "Amazing: Live in Moncton - Jumbotron video
  - "Beautiful: Live in Halifax - Jumbotron video
  - "Sweater Song: Live in St. John's - Jumbotron video

== Charts ==
Chart performance for Go with the Show
Chart (2010)	Peak position
Canadian Albums (Billboard)	27
