= The Show Must Go =

Studio album by Hedley
- Released: November 17, 2009 (CAN)
- Recorded: 2009
- Genres: Alternative rock; pop rock
- Length: 37:37 (standard); 44:27 (bonus tracks)
- Labels: Universal Music Canada; Island
- Producers: David Bendeth; John Feldmann; Dave Genn; Brian Howes

Hedley chronology
Famous Last Words (2007)	The Show Must Go (2009)	Go with the Show (2010)

Singles from The Show Must Go
- 1. "Cha-Ching" Released: August 17, 2009; 2. "Don't Talk to Strangers" Released: October 27, 2009; 3. "Perfect" Released: February 8, 2010; 4. "Hands Up" Released: June 29, 2010; 5. "Sweater Song" Released: December 2010

The Show Must Go is the third studio album by Canadian pop rock group Hedley. It is the first album by the band that drops their pop-punk / emo sound for more of a pop rock sound, It was released on November 17, 2009, in Canada. The album was successful, producing three top 20 singles, with the lead track, "Cha-Ching", and eighth track, "Perfect" both hitting the top 10. The album was later released in the US on December 7, 2010.

== Background ==
The group worked with producers David Bendeth, John Feldmann, Dave Genn and Brian Howes. Hoggard began writing songs for The Show Must Go as the band was wrapping up their Famous Last Words tour. The group wrote 45 songs over the course of three months before choosing the 11 tracks for the album. Songs from the album were inspired from "the collapse of several relationships — both romantic and platonic." Whereas Hedley and Famous Last Words were more pop punk and alternative rock influenced, this album was inspired by hip-hop music and electro beats. Hoggard stated, "I don't know if the album as a whole has anything to do with me liking Dizzee Rascal or Method Man. There are some songs that might lend to the production elements of urban music, but we still wanted the album to sound as acoustic as possible." In an interview with MuchMusic, Hoggard described The Show Must Go as a more "personal album" and that the band pushed themselves to create an honest record. The album's concept comes from "remembering that your whole life is not a show and you can't just always be performing."

In 2010, the band signed an American record deal with Island Records.

== Release ==
"Cha-Ching" was released to radio in Canada on August 17, 2009, as the lead single from the album. The song was released internationally the following day. "Don't Talk to Strangers" was released as the second single from the album on October 27, 2009. The album's third single "Perfect" was released on February 8, 2010, through Universal Music Canada. "Hands Up" was released on June 29, 2010, as the fourth single from the album. "Sweater Song" was released as the album's fifth single in December 2010.

The Show Must Go was released in the United States on December 7, 2010 via Island Records. The album features a different album cover, altered track listing and the songs "I Do (Wanna Love You)" and "Color Outside The Lines" in place of "Young and Stupid" and "9 Shades of Red". "Perfect" was released as the album's first single in the US on August 10, 2010.

== Critical reception ==
Professional ratings
Review scores
Source	Rating
AllMusic	3/5 stars
MuchMusic	4/5 stars
New Music Reviews	(Mixed)
PressPlus1	4/5 stars

The Show Must Go was met with positive reviews from music critics. Alexey Eremenko of AllMusic stated that the album features, "simple, straightforward guitar licks and a vocal delivery that teeters on the brink of larger-than-life emoting." He complimented the album for its catchiness, however criticized the record for its "cheesy hard rock of yesteryear." Sydney of MuchMusic called the album their best effort yet. She described the album's ninth track "Sweater Song" as the standout track, as well as praising "Amazing", calling the track, "a classic Hedley ballad." However, she stated that "Young & Stupid" is a skip. New Music Reviews wrote a mixed review on the album, writing, "Musically this album is not very technical, as the guitars and bass are very simple, yet still delivered extremely well, as usual. Lyrically this album is extremely up and down. Amid the usual heartbreaks and sadness, it also shows a lot more materialistic lyricism. In the end, Hedley have created a solid record, one that a lot of fans will not necessarily like due to the departure and progression of the band." Max Specht of PressPlus1 remarked, "Hedley has made a great album that won’t pigeonhole them, and although the first two singles might try to write them off as a novelty, there is a lot of quality to be found here in songs like 'Sweater Song' and 'Friends'."

== Track listing ==
Standard edition
No.	Title	Writer(s)	Producer(s)	Length
1.	"Cha-Ching"	Brian Howes	Howes	3:30
2.	"Don't Talk to Strangers"	Jacob Hoggard, David Rosin, Christian Crippin, Thomas MacDonald, Brian Howes, Jason Van Poederooyen	Howes	3:33
3.	"Scream"	Hoggard, Rosin, Crippin; MacDonald, David Katz, Sam Hollander, Howes	John Feldmann	2:51
4.	"Hands Up"	Hoggard, Rosin, Crippin, MacDonald, Feldmann	Feldmann	3:19
5.	"Amazing"	Hoggard, Dave Genn	David Bendeth	3:33
6.	"Shelter"	Hoggard, Rosin, Crippin, MacDonald, Genn	Genn	3:13
7.	"Young and Stupid"	Hoggard, Rosin, Crippin, MacDonald, Feldmann	Feldmann	3:10
8.	"Perfect"	Hoggard, Bendeth, Genn	Howes, Bendeth	4:13
9.	"Sweater Song"	Hoggard	Genn	3:21
10.	"9 Shades of Red"	Hoggard, Rosin, MacDonald, Crippin, Bendeth	David Bendeth	3:13
11.	"Friends"	Hoggard, Rosin, MacDonald, Crippin, Genn	Genn	3:38
Total length:				37:37

Bonus Tracks
No.	Title	Writer(s)	Producer(s)	Length
12.	"Goodbye" (iTunes Bonus Track)	Hoggard, Feldmann	Feldmann	3:23
13.	"Lucky" (iTunes Pre-Order)	Hoggard, Rosin, Crippin, MacDonald, Mike James, Troy Samson, Hollander	David Bendeth	2:54
Total length:				44:27

US edition
No.	Title	Writer(s)	Producer(s)	Length
1.	"Color Outside the Lines"	Hoggard, Howes, Rosin, Crippin, MacDonald, Poederooyen		4:01
2.	"I Do (Wanna Love You)"	Hoggard, Rosin, Crippin, MacDonald		3:24
3.	"Perfect"	Hoggard, Bendeth, Genn	Howes, Bendeth	4:11
4.	"Hands Up"	Hoggard, Rosin, Crippin, MacDonald, Feldmann	Feldmann	3:19
5.	"Shelter"	Hoggard, Rosin, Crippin, MacDonald, Genn	Genn	3:13
6.	"Amazing"	Hoggard, Genn	Bendeth	3:33
7.	"Cha-Ching"	Howes	Howes	3:30
8.	"Don't Talk to Strangers"	Hoggard, Rosin, Crippin, MacDonald, Howes, Poederooyen	Howes	3:33
9.	"Scream"	Hoggard, Rosin, Crippin, MacDonald, Katz, Hollander, Howes	Feldmann	2:51
10.	"Friends"	Hoggard, Rosin, MacDonald, Crippin, Genn	Genn	3:38
11.	"Sweater Song"	Hoggard	Genn	3:21

== Personnel ==
Credits for The Show Must Go adapted from AllMusic.

Hedley

- Jacob Hoggard – vocals, acoustic guitar, keyboard
- Dave Rosin – electric guitar, textures, background vocals
- Tommy Mac – bass, background vocals
- Chris Crippin – drums, background vocals

Additional musicians

- Brian Howes – keyboard, guitar, background vocals
- Jason Van Poederooyen – keyboard, percussion
- Joel Straton – background vocals
- Jay Benson – percussion
- John Feldmann – background vocals, percussion
- David Benedeth – percussion
- Dan Korneff – keyboard
- David Eggar – cello
- Jonathan Dinklange – violin
- The Late Show's Gospel Choir – vocals
- Dave Genn – guitar, keyboard, background vocals
- Darren Parris – bass
- Kelly Brock – background vocals
- Brian Davies – trumpet
- Mark D'Angelo – trumpet
- James Hopson – trombone
- James Robertson – french horn
- April White – background vocals

Production

- Misha Rajaratnam – editing
- Tom Lord-Alge – mixing
- Brian Howes – producing
- Jason Van Poederooyen – programming, engineering, editing
- Kyle Moorman – engineering
- Erik Ron – engineering
- John Feldmann – string arrangements, programming, producing
- Mike Fraser – mixing
- David Benedeth – producing
- John Bender – engineering, editing
- Kato Khandwala – engineering, editing
- John D'uva – engineering, editing
- Dan Korneff – engineering, editing, programming
- Dean Maher – engineering
- Dave Genn – producing

== Awards and nominations ==
Awards and nominations for The Show Must Go
Year	Organization	Award	Result	Ref(s)
2010	Juno Awards	Pop Album of the Year	Nominated	
2011	Juno Awards	Album of the Year	Nominated	

== Charts ==
=== Weekly charts ===
Weekly chart performance for The Show Must Go
Chart (2009)	Peak position
Canadian Albums (Billboard)	6

=== Year-end charts ===
Year-end chart performance for The Show Must Go
Chart (2010)	Peak position
Canadian Albums (Billboard)	16

== Certifications ==
Certifications and sales for The Show Must Go
Region	Certification	Certified units/sales
Canada (Music Canada)	2× Platinum	160,000^{^}
^{^} Shipments figures based on certification alone.

== Release history ==
List of release dates, showing region, release format, label catalog number, and reference
Country	Date	Format	Label	Catalog No.	Ref.
Canada	November 17, 2009	CD; digital download	Universal Music Canada	B002SXPK9S	
Uruguay	April 6, 2010	CD	Universal Music Canada	—N/a	
Worldwide	April 16, 2010	CD	Universal Music Canada	—N/a	
United States	December 7, 2010	CD; digital download	Island Records	B003ZYJS7Y	
United Kingdom	March 11, 2011	CD	Phantom Sound & Vision	B002SXPK9S	

== Tours ==
=== The Show Must Go... on the Road Tour ===
The Show Must Go... on the Road Tour
- Tour by Hedley
- Associated album: The Show Must Go
- Start date: March 22, 2010
- End date: October 2, 2010
- Legs: 2
- No. of shows: 39

Hedley concert chronology
- Famous Last Words Tour (2009); The Show Must Go... on the Road Tour (2010); Shipwrecked Tour (2012)

Hedley announced a tour across Canada in support of the album. Fefe Dobson and Stereos were supporting acts for the entire tour, while Boys Like Girls supported the dates from March 28 to April 10, and Faber Drive supported the other eight dates. A live album called Go With the Show was released in a CD/DVD pack on November 9, 2010. The CD contains tracks from the three final destinations of the tour from the first leg, as well as a documentary and bonus features on the DVD.

A second leg was announced on May 25, 2010. The opening acts touring with the band are San Sebastian, These Kids Wear Crowns, and Lights.

Setlist

1. "Cha-Ching"
2. "On My Own"
3. "Shelter"
4. "She's So Sorry"
5. "Perfect"
6. "Old School"
7. "Amazing"
8. "Saturday"
9. "Gunnin'"
10. "Don't Talk to Strangers"
11. "Friends"
12. "Beautiful"
13. "321"
14. "Never Too Late"

Encore:

1. "For the Nights I Can't Remember"
2. "Trip"

Tour dates

Date	City	Venue
First leg
March 22, 2010	Penticton	South Okanagan Events Centre
March 23, 2010	Victoria	Save-On-Foods Memorial Centre
March 25, 2010	Prince George	CN Centre
March 26, 2010	Dawson Creek	EnCana Events Centre
March 28, 2010	Calgary	The Corral
March 29, 2010	Edmonton	Shaw Conference Centre
March 30, 2010	Regina	Brandt Centre
March 31, 2010	Winnipeg	MTS Centre
April 3, 2010	Kitchener	Memorial Auditorium Complex
April 4, 2010	London	John Labatt Centre
April 5, 2010	Toronto	Air Canada Centre
April 7, 2010	Montreal	Bell Centre
April 8, 2010	Kingston	K-Rock Centre
April 9, 2010	Ottawa	Urbandale Centre
April 10, 2010	Quebec City	Pavillon de la Jeunesse
April 12, 2010	Sudbury	Sudbury Arena
April 15, 2010	Moncton	Moncton Coliseum
April 16, 2010	Halifax	Halifax Metro Centre
April 20, 2010	St. John's	Mile One Centre
Second leg
June 30, 2010	Bala	The Kee to Bala
July 1, 2010	Bala	The Kee to Bala
July 2, 2010	Fort Erie, Ontario	Friendship Festival
July 3, 2010	Owen Sound	Big Music Fest
July 10, 2010	Alma	Festivalma
August 6, 2010	Rouyn-Noranda	Osisko en lumière
September 11, 2010	Burnaby	Deer Lake Park
September 13, 2010	Kamloops	Interior Savings Centre
September 14, 2010	Kelowna	Prospera Place
September 16, 2010	Red Deer	ENMAX Centrium Arena
September 17, 2010	Medicine Hat	Medicine Hat Arena
September 19, 2010	Brandon	Keystone Centre
September 22, 2010	Sault Ste. Marie	Essar Centre
September 23, 2010	Oshawa	General Motors Centre
September 25, 2010	Windsor	Windsor Family Credit Union Centre
September 27, 2010	Cornwall	Cornwall Civic Complex
September 28, 2010	Barrie	Barrie Molson Centre
September 30, 2010	Guelph	Sleeman Centre
October 1, 2010	Peterborough	Peterborough Memorial Centre
October 2, 2010	Mississauga	Hershey Centre
