= 2008 MuchMusic Video Awards =

Edition of Canadian annual award show

- 2008 MuchMusic Video Awards Logo
- Starring: Leah Miller, Matte Babel, Tim Deegan, Sarah Taylor, Devon Soltendieck, Hannah Simone
- Country of origin: Canada

Production
- Producer: MuchMusic
- Running time: 2 hours

Original release
- Network: MuchMusic
- Release: June 15, 2008

The 2008 MuchMusic Video Awards were held in Toronto, Ontario at MuchMusic's headquarters on June 15, 2008 with the rain-soaked Red carpet arrivals that started at 8:00pm ET, but was slightly delayed by rainstorms that soaked the crowds and artists, the awards started at 9:00 and ended at 11:00. The show featured performances by illScarlett, Flo Rida, Girlicious, Sean Kingston, JabbaWockeeZ, Simple Plan, the first performance by New Kids on the Block in 15 years and others. The most nominated artist was Hedley with six nominations in which they won four awards. This was the first MMVA to have an afterparty, which was broadcast exclusively on MuchMusic.com, and featured Bedouin Soundclash.

== Awards ==
The nominees were, with the winners in bold:

=== Best Video ===
- **Hedley — "For the Nights I Can't Remember"**
- Belly feat. Mario Winans — "Ridin'"
- Feist — "1234"
- illScarlett — "Nothing Special"
- Simple Plan — "When I'm Gone"

=== Best Director ===
- **Hedley — "For The Nights I Can't Remember" (directed by: Kevin De Freitas)**
- Bedouin Soundclash — "Walls Fall Down" (directed by: Marc Ricciardelli)
- Belly feat. Mario Winans — "Ridin'" (directed by: RT!)
- illScarlett — "Nothing Special" (directed by: Chris Sargent & Steve Mottershead)
- Sam Roberts — "Them Kids" (directed by: Dave Pawsey)

=== Best Post-Production ===
- **Sam Roberts — "Them Kids" (post-production: Duplex)**
- Buck 65 — "Dang" (post-production: Christopher Mills)
- Classified ft. Maestro & DJ IV — "Hard To Be Hip-Hop" (post-production: Aden Bahadori & harv)
- illScarlett — "Nothing Special" (post-production: Steve Mottershead)
- The Saint Alvia Cartel — "Blonde Kryptonite" (post-production: Nick Flook, Mike Sevigny & Jeff Middleton)

=== Best Cinematography ===
- **Hedley — "For the Nights I Can't Remember" (Samy Inayeh)**
- Belly feat. Mario Winans — "Ridin'" (Brendan Steacy)
- City and Colour — "Waiting" (Simon Shohet)
- Hedley — "She's So Sorry" (Samy Inayeh)
- Skye Sweetnam — "Human" (Brendan Steacy)

=== MuchLOUD Best Rock Video ===
- **Hedley — "She's So Sorry"**
- illScarlett — "Nothing Special"
- Simple Plan — "When I'm Gone"
- Sum 41 — "With Me"
- The Trews — "Hold Me In Your Arms"

=== MuchVIBE Best Rap Video ===
- **Belly ft. Mario Winans — "Ridin'"**
- Classified ft. Maestro & DJ IV — "Hard To Be Hip-Hop"
- JB ft. The Game — Fire In Ya Eyes
- JDiggz ft. Voyce — Just Wanna Party
- Tru-Paz — Hotel Hell

=== VideoFACT Best Independent Video ===
- **Wintersleep — "Weighty Ghost"**
- Bedouin Soundclash — "Walls Fall Down"
- Cancer Bats — "Hail Destroyer"
- Neverending White Lights — "Always"
- The Russian Futurists — "Paul Simon"

=== MuchMusic.com Most Watched Video ===
1. **Rihanna — "Umbrella"**
2. Avril Lavigne — "Girlfriend"
3. Fergie — "Big Girls Don't Cry"
4. Timbaland f. Keri Hilson & D.O.E. — "The Way I Are"
5. Hilary Duff — "Stranger"

=== Best International Video - Artist ===
- **Rihanna — "Don't Stop the Music"**
- Alicia Keys — "No One"
- Chris Brown ft. T-Pain — "Kiss Kiss"
- Fergie — "Clumsy"
- Flo Rida ft. T-Pain — "Low"
- Kanye West — "Stronger"
- Madonna ft. Justin Timberlake and Timbaland — "4 Minutes"
- Miley Cyrus — "Start All Over"
- Sean Kingston — "Beautiful Girls"
- Usher ft. Young Jeezy — "Love In This Club"

=== Best International Video - Group ===
- **Linkin Park — "Bleed It Out"**
- Fall Out Boy — "The Take Over, The Break's Over"
- Foo Fighters — "The Pretender"
- MGMT — "Time to Pretend"
- Maroon 5 — "Wake Up Call"
- OneRepublic — "Stop and Stare"
- Panic! at the Disco — "Nine In The Afternoon"
- Queens Of The Stone Age — "Sick, Sick, Sick"
- Timbaland presents OneRepublic — "Apologize"
- Tokio Hotel — "Ready, Set, Go!"

=== UR Fave: International Video ===
- **Fall Out Boy — "The Take Over, The Break's Over"**
- Flo Rida ft. T-Pain — "Low"
- Kanye West— "Stronger"
- Rihanna — "Don't Stop the Music"
- OneRepublic ft. Timbaland — "Apologize"

=== UR Fave: Group ===
- **Simple Plan — "When I'm Gone"**
- Hedley — "For The Nights I Can't Remember"
- Billy Talent — "Surrender"
- Finger Eleven — "Falling On"
- illScarlett — "Nothing Special"

=== UR Fave: Artist ===
- **Avril Lavigne — "When You're Gone"**
- Belly ft. Mario Winans — "Ridin'"
- Feist — "1234"
- City and Colour — "Waiting"
- Nelly Furtado — "Do It

== Contests ==
=== MMVA10k ===
MuchMusic held the MMVA10k Contest during the Video Awards. Three weeks prior to the event 2008 MMVA predictions and trivia were posted daily and viewers were able to play along during the live event on June 15, 2008. For every 500 points, viewers received a ballot to win $10,000. Viewers were also able to answer polls and chat with other MMVA viewers.

== Performances ==
The following acts performed a song live during the show:

- "Low" — Flo Rida
- "When I'm Gone" - Simple Plan
- "Nothing Special" — illScarlett
- "Take You There"/"There's Nothin" — Sean Kingston featuring Élan
- "Dangerous" — Kardinal Offishall featuring Akon
- JabbaWockeeZ - "Stronger" by Kanye West
- "Never Too Late" — Hedley
- "Like Me" — Girlicious
- "Take a Bow" — Rihanna
- "Summertime" — New Kids on the Block

== Guests ==
- Chace Crawford
- Brody Jenner
- Whitney Port
- Kristin Cavallari
- Kal Penn
- Jesse McCartney
- Melanie C
- Mike Myers
- Perez Hilton
- Sum 41
- Sam Roberts
- Theory of a Deadman
- The Trews
- Belly
- Finger Eleven
- Bedouin Soundclash
- City and Colour
- Rainn Wilson
- Jason Spezza

== MMVA08: Aftermath ==
The 2008 MuchMusic Video Awards are the only MMVA to feature an afterparty. The afterparty featured Bedouin Soundclash performing in front of a small crowd with several other artists. They performed a total of ten songs. The afterparty aired only once for a scheduled 30 minutes after the MMVA on muchmusic.com and MuchMoreMusic, but extended for a few minutes on muchmusic.com.

=== Performances ===
The performances were:

- St. Andrews — Bedouin Soundclash
- I Wanna Be Sedated — Bedouin Soundclash
- Can't Hurry Love — Bedouin Soundclash with Zaki Ibrahim
- Should I Stay Or Should I Go — Bedouin Soundclash with Saint Alvia
- Come Dancing — Bedouin Soundclash with Sam Roberts & K-OS
- Mirror In The Bathroom — Bedouin Soundclash with Wade MacNeil of Alexisonfire
- Pressure Drop — Bedouin Soundclash with all guests
- Dancing In The Dark — Bedouin Soundclash with Arkells & Saint Alvia
- Yesterday — K-OS
- Don't Let Me Down — Bedouin Soundclash with all guests
