= 1-up (disambiguation) =

A 1-up, or extra life, is a video game item.

1-UP, 1UP, 1Up, or one-up may also refer to:

- 1Up.com, a defunct video game website
- 1UP!, a 2009 album by illScarlett
- 1UP (T-Pain album), a 2019 album by T-Pain
- 1-Up Studio, a Japanese video game studio formerly known as Brownie Brown
- One-upmanship, successively outdoing a competitor
- 1Up (film), a movie from 2022
- 1UP (graffiti crew),, primarily active in Berlin, Germany

== See also ==
- One up (disambiguation)
