= Nothing Special =

Single by illScarlett

from the album All Day With It
- Released: July 9, 2007
- Genre: Ska punk, alternative rock
- Length: 3:28
- Label: Sony BMG Music Canada; Sanctuary Records; Infect the Masses
- Songwriter(s): Alexander Jan Norman, Slawomir Piorkowski
- Producer(s): Matthew Wilder

IllScarlett singles chronology
| "One-A" (2006) | "Nothing Special" (2007) | "Life of a Soldier" (2007) |

"Nothing Special" is a song by the Canadian band illScarlett. It appeared on their first studio album, Clearly in Another Fine Mess. It was re-released on the band's second album, All Day With It, as the first single from the album. The song got into heavy rotation at Toronto's 102.1 The Edge, and Ottawa's Live 88.5, and has reached #1 on the MuchMusic Countdown.

== Music video ==
The video was directed by Chris Sargent who has also directed videos for Alexisonfire. It features the band inside a house doing various activities in sped-up motion, while Alex Norman's mouth moves at normal speed to sync up with the singing.

== Charts ==
| Chart | Position |
|---|---|
| Canadian Hot 100 | 87 |

== Nomination ==
The song and band were nominated for a People's Choice: Favourite Canadian Group award at the 2008 MuchMusic Video Awards.
