= ILLP =

Album by IllScarlett

Studio album by IllScarlett
- Released: 2004
- Genre: Ska punk Reggae rock Alternative rock
- Length: 40:49

IllScarlett chronology
| ILLP (2004) | Clearly in Another Fine Mess (2006) |

ILLP (styled as iLLP) is the first album released by IllScarlett. The album was released by the band independently. Some songs on ILLP are also featured in albums that were later released by IllScarlett, such as; a live version of "Babylon Song", "Not a Prophecy", and "Mary Jane" that were included on the band's 2006 album Clearly in Another Fine Mess, "Pacino" which was included on EPdemic and All Day With It, and "Clearer Now" which was included in All Day With It.

"Babylon Song" was featured on the 2005 S.C.E.N.E. Music Festival 2-Disc Compilation CD.

== Track listing ==
1. "Line Check" – 2:10
2. "Lie To Me" – 2:45
3. "Babylon Song" – 3:29
4. "Don't Stop" – 3:47
5. "Not a Prophecy" – 3:21
6. "Clearer Now" – 2:59
7. "Heavy Reggae" – 3:43
8. "Crazy" – 3:45
9. "Mary Jane" – 4:06
10. "Roll It" – 3:46
11. "Here We Go" – 3:47
12. "Pacino" – 3:11
