= The Other Man (song) =

Single by Sloan

from the album Pretty Together
- Released: January 2002
- Genre: Alternative rock
- Length: 3:54
- Label: Murderecords, BMG Music Canada
- Songwriter(s): Chris Murphy, Sloan
- Producer(s): Brenndan McGuire, Sloan

Sloan singles chronology
"If It Feels Good Do It" (2001)	"The Other Man" (2002)	"The Rest of My Life" (2003)

Music video
- "The Other Man" on YouTube

"The Other Man" is a song by Canadian rock band Sloan. It was released as the second single from the band's sixth studio album, Pretty Together. "The Other Man" was a hit in Canada, reaching #18 in the country. The song was one of the top 35 most played songs on Canadian radio in 2002.

== Inspiration ==
The song was inspired by Chris Murphy's relationship with Leslie Feist, which describes a love triangle between the two and Broken Social Scene member Andrew Whiteman, whom Feist was also seeing while dating Murphy.
