= One up =

One up or One Up may refer to:

- One-upmanship, the art or practice of successively outdoing a competitor
- 1-up, a video game item that increments the player character's number of lives
- One Up (song), 2022 song by British rapper Central Cee

== See also ==
- 1-up (disambiguation)
