= Perfect (Hedley song) =

Single by Hedley

from the album The Show Must Go
- Released: February 8, 2010
- Recorded: 2009
- Genre: Pop rock
- Length: 4:10
- Label: Universal Canada; Island
- Songwriters: Jacob Hoggard; David Bendeth; Dave Genn
- Producers: Brian Howes; David Bendeth

Hedley singles chronology
"Don't Talk to Strangers" (2009)	"Perfect" (2010)	"Hands Up" (2010)

Music video
- "Perfect" on YouTube

"Perfect" is a song by recorded by Canadian pop rock band Hedley for their third studio album, The Show Must Go (2009). Lead singer Jacob Hoggard co-wrote the song with David Bendeth and Dave Genn, while Bendeth co-produced the track with Brian Howes. It was first released on February 8, 2010, through Universal Music Canada as the record's third single. "Perfect" was released in the United States through Island Records on August 10, 2010, as the group's first official single in that country.

Upon release, "Perfect" reached number seven on the Canadian Hot 100, earning the band their second top-10 single from The Show Must Go. It also became their first charting entry in the US by peaking at number 25 on the Billboard Adult Pop Songs chart.

The song earned a nomination for Single of the Year at the Juno Awards of 2011. It also won a SOCAN Pop/Rock song award in 2010 for its strong radio presence and two MuchMusic Video Awards, including Video of the Year, at the 2010 ceremony.

== Composition ==
"Perfect" is a pop rock song written by Jacob Hoggard, David Bendeth, and Dave Genn which lasts for four minutes and ten seconds. The ballad opens on a short piano riff, which is then repeated in the background during the verses. According to the sheet music published by Universal Music Publishing Group, "Perfect" is composed in the key of C major and set in common time to a moderate tempo of 76 BPM. The song follows a chord progression of Am – F – C – G_{sus} – G (except for the chorus, which omits the G_{sus}) and includes a vocal range of one octave and three notes, from G_{4} to C_{6}. Lyrically, the song is about a man owning up to his mistakes and vowing to try to be a better man. Hoggard told the Toronto Sun that "Perfect" represents the band "feeling confident in this new line of [more mature] music," and described the song as "a big turning point for [them]."

== Awards and nominations ==
At the 2010 MuchMusic Video Awards, the video for "Perfect" was nominated in five categories: Video of the Year, Best Post-Production, Best Cinematography, Director of the Year (for Kyle Davison), and People's Choice (UR Fave). It won the awards for Post-Production and Video of the Year, their second win in the latter category. "Perfect" received a SOCAN Award in 2010 in the category of Pop / Rock for performing well on radio. It also received a SOCAN Award for Most Played Song. The following year, "Perfect" was nominated for Single of the Year at the Juno Awards of 2011, but lost to Young Artists for Haiti's cover of K'naan's "Wavin' Flag". Jacob Hoggard of Hedley was one of the artists contributing to the supergroup, making him one of the recipients of the award. The music video also won the Juno Award for Video of the Year.

== Chart performance ==
"Perfect" entered the Billboard Canadian Hot 100 at number 36 on the chart dated December 5, 2009. It was the week's highest-ranking debut and also notably debuted one spot above the position of their previous single, "Don't Talk to Strangers", which was the week's "airplay gainer". After reaching the top 10 in April 2010, "Perfect" peaked at number 7 on the chart dated May 8, 2010. The song reached a peak position of 5 on the Canadian Digital Songs component chart the same week.

"Perfect" is the band's first song to enter one of the US Billboard charts, debuting at number 40 on the Adult Pop Songs chart dated October 2, 2010. The song spent 20 weeks on the chart and reached a peak of 25 on the chart dated January 1, 2011.

On a chart compiled by CBC Music, also based on numbers reported by Nielsen, "Perfect" was listed as the 44th most-played song on Canadian radio between January 1, 2001 and July 2015.

== Music video ==
On March 1, 2010, the group released a teaser for the music video for "Perfect". It was directed by Kyle Davison and Mahlon Todd Williams and premiered March 5, 2010. It alternates between performance shots – first of Hoggard alone at a piano, and later the whole band – in an all-white room and "abstract vignettes" that depict a tumultuous relationship; the latter are presented in slow motion, with images of flames or shattered glass superimposed on the scene. Toward the end of the video, Hoggard is shown dressed all in white while the female character hurls a bucketful of red paint at him. This red splatter imagery is used in the single artwork. According to Davison, the video is meant to represent "a relationship at the beginning of the end."

== Charts ==
=== Weekly charts ===
Weekly chart performance for "Perfect"
Chart (2010–11)	Peak position
Canada (Canadian Hot 100)	7
Canada AC (Billboard)	5
Canada CHR/Top 40 (Billboard)	8
Canada Hot AC (Billboard)	2
US Adult Pop Airplay (Billboard)	25

=== Year-end charts ===
Year-end chart performance for "Perfect"
Chart (2010)	Position
Canada (Canadian Hot 100)	18

== Release history ==
Release dates and formats for "Perfect"
Region	Date	Format	Label	Ref.
Canada	February 8, 2010	Contemporary hit radio	Universal Music Canada	
United States	August 10, 2010	Digital download	Island	
