= Tamara Taggart =

Canadian podcaster and former television presenter (born 1968)

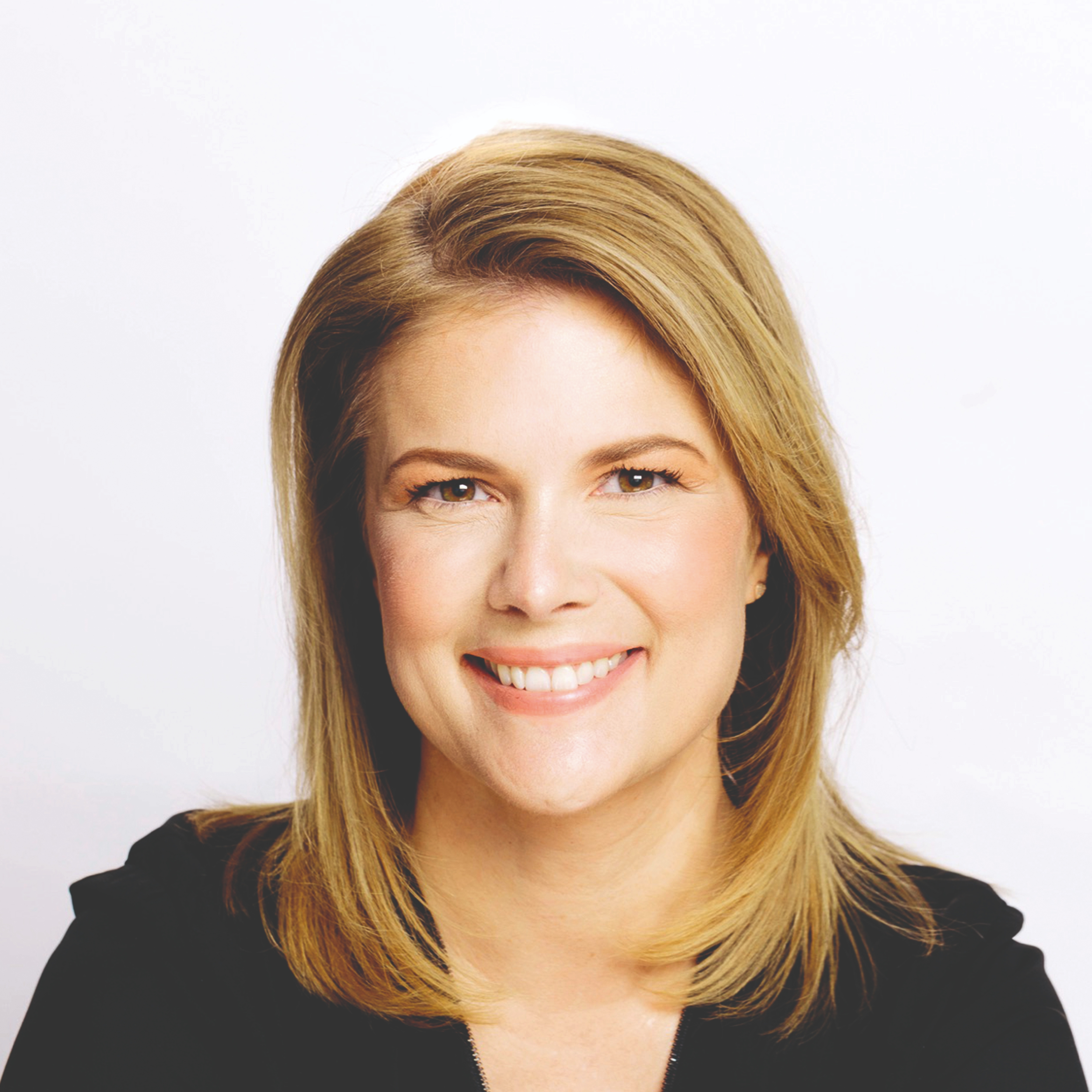
- Taggart in 2017
- Born: May 2, 1968 (age 57); Vancouver, British Columbia, Canada
- Occupation: Former news anchor
- Spouse: Dave Genn

Tamara Taggart OBC (born May 2, 1968) is a Canadian podcaster and former television presenter. She served as the weekday anchor of CTV News at Six alongside Mike Killeen on CIVT-TV ("CTV British Columbia") in Vancouver between 2010 and 2018.

== Biography ==
Taggart's career in broadcasting started while she was attending BCIT in Burnaby, British Columbia, where she was enrolled in the Broadcast Communications program. She graduated in 1991. Her class included Vancouver sports broadcaster John Shorthouse, NewCap Radio GM Steve Parsons, longtime Z95.3 FM host Buzz Bishop (now hosting mornings on XL 103 in Calgary), Erin Wilde (now hosting mornings on C97 in Calgary), McVay Media writer and program director Paul Durante, swing-shift DJ John Woodlock and former long-time Cariboo broadcast personality Dalton Hooker. Her early work was in radio and concert promotion. However, in 1997, she landed a recurring role on community calendar spots on CIVT-DT (then known as "Vancouver Television"). From there, she moved on to co-host the breakfast show and then, later, the entertainment spot on the evening news.

In 2001, Taggart moved over to the weather desk where she stayed for nine years. During the station's 5 pm, 6pm and 11:30 pm newscasts she presented the forecast from CTV's studios as well as various (and numerous) locations around Vancouver, the Lower Mainland and on Vancouver Island. In January 2011, Taggart transferred to the CTV news desk.

Taggart also hosted a home renovation show, Love It or Lose It, for two seasons, on the Home and Garden TV channel (HGTV).

Taggart had minor roles in the films Antitrust, Josie and the Pussycats, Halloween: Resurrection and Along Came a Spider, and on several television series, including Robson Arms, Cold Squad, and Touching Evil.

The Georgia Straight Annual Reader's Poll named Taggart as Vancouver's "Best TV Weather Person" and "Best TV Personality" in 2002, 2003 and 2004. She was named "Woman of the Year" at the Consumer's Choice Awards in 2003 and has appeared on the cover of TV Week Magazine seven times. In 2005, Taggart was nominated for a Leo Award for "Best Host, Lifestyles Series" for Love It or Lose It. Taggart has also been featured in Hello Canada in July 2009 and August 2009.

Taggart was married on February 4, 2006, to Juno award-winning guitarist and record producer Dave Genn with Senator Larry Campbell, former mayor of Vancouver, serving as the officiant at the marriage ceremony. Taggart and Genn (currently still an active member of the band 54-40) have a son and two daughters.

Taggart co-hosted Live! with Regis and Kelly for one day on Friday August 21, 2009.

On December 8, 2010, it was announced that Taggart would co-anchor the CTV News at Six alongside Mike Killeen, effective January 3, 2011, following the stepping-down of longtime anchors Pamela Martin and Bill Good. In 2018, Taggart and Killeen were fired from CTV due to restructuring.

On December 11, 2018, Taggart announced that she was seeking the Liberal nomination for Vancouver Kingsway in the 2019 federal election. She secured the nomination, but lost the election to the incumbent, Don Davies.

Currently, Tamara is the host for the Telus Talks with Tamara Taggart podcast series. She works for Telus in March 2020 to launch the weekly podcast, where she interviews doctors, healthcare professionals and prominent Canadians.

== Electoral record ==
2019 Canadian federal election: Vancouver Kingsway
Party	Candidate	Votes	%	±%	Expenditures
New Democratic	Don Davies	21,680	49.09	+3.35	$96,884.11
Liberal	Tamara Taggart	10,194	23.08	−4.73	$96,618.31
Conservative	Helen Quan	8,804	19.94	−1.08	none listed
Green	Lawrence Taylor	2,675	6.06	+2.81	none listed
People's	Ian Torn	427	0.97	–	$3,869.88
Communist	Kimball Cariou	292	0.66	−0.32	none listed
Marxist–Leninist	Donna Peterson	91	0.21	+0.03	$0.00
Total valid votes/expense limit		44,163	99.00		
Total rejected ballots		446	1.00	−0.03	
Turnout		44,609	58.67	−4.65	
Eligible voters		76,039			
New Democratic hold		Swing		+4.04	
Source: Elections Canada
