= IllScarlett (album) =

2014 album by IllScarlett

illScarlett

Studio album by illScarlett
- Released: September 2, 2014
- Genre: Ska punk; reggae rock; alternative rock; pop rock
- Label: Universal Music Canada

IllScarlett chronology
2012 EP (2012)	illScarlett (2014)

Singles from illScarlett
- 1. "My Money" Released: May 21, 2013

illScarlett is the fifth studio album by Canadian ska band illScarlett, released on September 2, 2014. The first single from the album is titled "My Money" and was released May 21, 2013, on iTunes.

== Track listing ==
No.	Title	Length
1.	"Blackout"	2:58
2.	"Down for Whatever"	3:04
3.	"Remedy"	3:21
4.	"My Money"	2:51
5.	"Set It on Fire"	3:28
6.	"Ghosts"	3:40
7.	"On My Way"	3:16
8.	"Rescue Me"	2:43
9.	"Raindrops"	3:00
10.	"Too Late"	3:31
11.	"Last Night Stand"	2:54
12.	"Love Is Strange"	3:30
13.	"Don't Rush"	3:20

== Personnel ==
- Alex Norman — guitar and vocals
- Swavek Piorkowski — drums
- Will Marr — guitar
- CJ Hinds — bass
