= If It Feels Good Do It =

Single by Sloan

from the album Pretty Together
- Released: August 27, 2001
- Genre: Rock
- Length: 4:13 (Radio version); 3:56 (Album version)
- Label: Murderecords, BMG Music Canada
- Songwriter(s): Patrick Pentland, Sloan
- Producer(s): Brenndan McGuire, Sloan

Sloan singles chronology
"Don’t You Believe a Word" (2000)	"If It Feels Good Do It" (2001)	"The Other Man" (2002)

Music video
- "If It Feels Good, Do It (People Version)" on YouTube

"If It Feels Good Do It" is a song by Canadian rock band Sloan. It was released as the lead single from the band's sixth studio album, Pretty Together. The song was first made available online in August 2001. The song was nominated for Best Single at the 2002 Juno Awards. The song is featured on the soundtrack of the EA Sports video game Triple Play 2002 and is also featured in the 2004 film The Girl Next Door.

== Music video ==
The music video for "If It Feels Good Do It" was directed by Noble Jones. There are two different versions of the music video. The original version, known as the "People Version", which aired in Canada features a transition between the band playing and commentary of several people expressing their opinion on what rock and roll is about (in reference to Chris Murphy's opening line of the song). This version also features a cameo by Canadian rock musician Danko Jones. The other version, known as the "Performance Version", which aired in the U.S. features just the band performing without the commentary.

The video won the award for "Best Video" at the East Coast Music Awards. The video also won the award for "Best Cinematography" at the 2002 MuchMusic Video Awards, while peaking at #6 on MuchMusic's Top 30 Countdown.
