= MuchMusic Video Award for Best Cinematography =

The following is a list of the MuchMusic Video Awards winners for Best Cinematography.

Year	Artist	Video
1995	Blue Rodeo	"Bad Timing"
1996	Ashley MacIssac	"Sleepy Maggie"
1997	The Tragically Hip	"Gift Shop"
1998	The Tea Party	"Release"
1999	Wide Mouth Mason	"Why"
2000	Dream Warriors	"Breathe or Die"
2001	Big Wreck	"Inhale"
2002	Sloan	"If It Feels Good Do It"
2003	Our Lady Peace	"Innocent"
2004	Sam Roberts	"Hard Road"
2005	k-os	"Man I Used to Be"
2006	Buck 65	"Devil's Eyes"
2007	Alexisonfire	"This Could Be Anywhere in the World"
2008	Hedley	"She's So Sorry"
2009	Bedouin Soundclash	"Until We Burn In the Sun (The Kids Just Want a Love Song)"
2010	Drake feat. Trey Songz and Lil' Wayne	"Successful"
2011	Blake McGrath	"Relax"
2012	Marianas Trench	"Fallout"
