= Famous Last Words (Hedley album) =

Studio album by Hedley
- Released: October 30, 2007 (CAN); May 12, 2009 (USA)
- Studios: Rock Beach Recording (White Rock); Hipposonic Studios (Vancouver); The Warehouse Studio (Vancouver)
- Genres: Hard rock; pop punk; emo
- Length: 43:35; 48:33 (USA Release)
- Labels: Universal Music Canada; Fontana
- Producer: Greig Nori

Hedley chronology
Hedley (2005)	Famous Last Words (2007)	The Show Must Go (2009)

Singles from Famous Last Words
- 1. "She's So Sorry" Released: August 21, 2007; 2. "For the Nights I Can't Remember" Released: November 2007; 3. "Never Too Late" Released: April 4, 2008; 4. "Old School" Released: August 2008; 5. "Dying to Live Again" Released: November 2008

Alternative cover
- US edition cover

Famous Last Words is the second studio album by Canadian pop rock band Hedley. It was released on October 30, 2007. It debuted at number three on the Canadian Albums Chart upon release. In the United States, the album is known as Never Too Late and was released on May 12, 2009. The album only includes 8 tracks from the Canadian release and contains 5 tracks from Hedley, which replaced the missing tracks from Famous Last Words. Unlike Famous Last Words, Never Too Late has a blue background on its album cover, whereas the Canadian release has a red background on its cover.

== Background and recording ==
The group began working on their second studio album in May 2007, with producers Dave Genn and Greig Nori. The album was recorded at Hipposonic Studios and The Warehouse Studio in Vancouver, British Columbia and in Rock Beach Recording in White Rock, British Columbia. Feeling the pressure after releasing their debut album, Hedley, which increased their audience, the band headed into the studio with a goal to "make a better record" and set the bar high for themselves. According to singer Jacob Hoggard; the album completion process was lengthy. He also felt that they showcased a lot of maturity on the record compared to their debut release and said the band "have learned the value of patience." Though songs such as "She's So Sorry" and "Narcissist" maintain a pop punk sound, other tracks such as "For the Nights I Can't Remember" and "Dying to Live Again" have been described as emotional ballads. The band also experiments with ska and reggae on "Never Too Late".

The group were originally supposed to embarked on a headlining Canadian tour, however, the band was chosen to open for Bon Jovi on their Lost Highway Tour at their Canadian stops for 14 shows which forced them to postpone their own tour. It was rescheduled for January 2008 and they were supported by State of Shock.

A bonus track edition for the album featuring "Lose My Number" was released digitally, as well as the B-side "Alison Wonderland (Afraid)". In the United States, the group released Famous Last Words under the name Never Too Late on May 12, 2009, by Fontana Distribution.

== Singles ==
The first single from the album, "She's So Sorry", was released to radio on August 21, 2007. The video was shot in Toronto, Ontario on August 30, and premiered on MuchMusic on September 20, 2007. The song reached number 50 on the Canadian Hot 100.

The album's second single, "For the Nights I Can't Remember", was serviced to contemporary hit radio in November 2007. The song peaked at number six on the Canadian Hot 100. It also topped the Canada Hot AC airplay chart.

The third single, "Never Too Late", was released on April 4, 2008, the same day the music video premiered on MuchOnDemand. The song peaked at number four on the Canadian Hot 100.

The fourth single from the album, "Old School" was released in August 2008, and peaked at number 10 on the Canadian Hot 100. It was serviced to contemporary hit radio in the US on March 31, 2009.

"Dying to Live Again" was released in November 2008, as the fifth single from the album. The song peaked at number 59 on the Canadian Hot 100.

== Critical reception ==
Professional ratings
Review scores
Source	Rating
AllMusic	2.5/5 stars
Melodic	3.5/5 stars
Starpulse	2/5 stars
TuneLab Music	5/10 stars

Famous Last Words was received with mixed to low reviews. Andrew Leahey of AllMusic gave the album a 2.5/5 star rating. He said, "Famous Last Words delivers the same kick of Hedley's innumerable pop-punk colleagues, relying on a blend of snot-nosed vocals and guitar muscle that evokes the likes of SR-71 and Hot Topic in the same breath. He ends off stating, "Famous Last Words does sound destined for airplay as a result, proving that Jacob Hoggard knows how to stay in the spotlight better than he knows how to craft original music. Nick of Tunelab.com gave the album a 5/10 star rating. He stated, "If you are familiar with Hedley’s sound, then their often times hard to take seriously and borderline sugarcoated approach shouldn’t come as a shock." Kaj Roth of Melodic called the tracks "For the Nights I Can't Remember" and "Dying to Live Again" as "modern rock version of Hanson." Adrian Mack of The Georgia Straight stated that the group, "abandoned any effort to distinguish itself from the network of tatty Canadiana it finds itself caught up in, settling for an almost mathematically perfect melding of Treble Charger and Sum 41." Billboard wrote, "At the core are such propulsive, Vans Warped tour-ready rock anthems as 'She's So Sorry', 'Narcissist' and 'Hand Grenade'. Hedley also comes stocked with the buoyant pop of the title track and such pining power ballads as the sentimental first single 'Old School'. It can be a tough jump from Much Music to MTV, but Hedley may be able to pull it off."

== Track listing ==
Famous Last Words track listing
No.	Title	Writer(s)	Length
1.	"She's So Sorry"	Jacob Hoggard; Dave Rosin; Tom MacDonald; Chris Crippin; Brian Howes	3:36
2.	"Hand Grenade"	Hoggard; Rosin; MacDonald; Crippin; Greig Nori	3:04
3.	"Dying to Live Again"	Hoggard; Rosin; MacDonald; Crippin; Howes	4:18
4.	"Narcissist"	Hoggard; Rosin; MacDonald; Crippin; Dave Genn	3:10
5.	"Bones Shatter (Never Say Never)"	Hoggard; Rosin; MacDonald; Crippin	3:19
6.	"Old School"	Hoggard; Rosin; MacDonald; Crippin; Genn	3:41
7.	"Been There Done That"	Hoggard; Rosin; MacDonald; Crippin; Nori; Genn; Davor Valuma; Johnny Hetherington (Art of Dying)	3:16
8.	"For the Nights I Can't Remember"	Hoggard; Rosin; MacDonald; Crippin; Genn; Nori	4:02
9.	"Brave New World"	Hoggard; Rosin; MacDonald; Crippin; Sean Hosein; Dane Deviller	3:58
10.	"Dear Blank"	Hoggard; Rosin; MacDonald; Crippin; Hosein; Deviller	3:26
11.	"Can't Go Back"	Hoggard; Rosin; MacDonald; Crippin; Genn; Nori; Ben Cook	4:01
12.	"Never Too Late"	Hoggard; Rosin; MacDonald; Crippin; Nori	4:00
Total length:			43:35

Bonus tracks
No.	Title	Length
13.	"Lose My Number" (iTunes preorder bonus track)	3:14
14.	"Alison Wonderland (Afraid)" (Rogers Music Store bonus track)	3:14

=== Never Too Late (USA Release) ===
No.	Title	Length
1.	"She's So Sorry"	3:34
2.	"321"	3:45
3.	"Trip"	4:04
4.	"For the Nights I Can't Remember"	4:02
5.	"Never Too Late"	3:59
6.	"Gunnin'"	4:12
7.	"On My Own"	3:29
8.	"Bones Shatter (Never Say Never)"	3:19
9.	"Old School"	3:41
10.	"Narcissist"	3:10
11.	"Hand Grenade"	3:04
12.	"Dying to Live Again"	4:04
Total length:		44:32

== Personnel ==
Adapted from the Famous Last Words booklet.

Hedley

- Jacob Hoggard – Vocals and piano
- Tommy Mac – Bass and backing vocals
- Dave Rosin – Guitar and backing vocals
- Chris Crippin – Drums and backing vocals

Additional musicians

- Brian Howes – Guitar solo (on "She's So Sorry")
- Greig Nori – Guitar solo (on "Brave New World")
- Ray Garraway – Drums (on "Never Too Late")
- Gillian Mott (Violin), Joshua Belvedere (Violin), Bernard Kane (Viola), Alexandra Sia (Cello) – Strings (on "Old School" and "Dying to Live Again")
- Sal Ferreres – Percussion
- Dave Genn – Guitars, string arrangements, piano, keyboards, additional production
- Ben Kaplan – Additional keyboards
- Elaine Shepherd, April White, Carly "Charly" Campbell – Back-up singers

Production

- Mike Fraser – Mixing
- Dean Maher – Engineering
- Brian Gardner – Mastering (Bernie Grundman Mastering; Los Angeles)
- Alex Aligizakis – Additional recording
- Dave Ottoson – Pre-Pro recording, mixing
- Shawn O'Hara – Assistant engineer (Rock Beach Recording)
- Brendon Brown, Brock McFarlane, Chris Michael – Assistant engineers (Hipposonic Studios)
- Eric Mosher – Assistant engineer (Warehouse Studios)

Artwork

- Garnet Armstrong – Art direction, design
- Matt Barnes – Photography
- Simon Paul – Design
- Steve McArdle – 3D illustration

== Charts ==
=== Weekly charts ===
Weekly chart performance for Famous Last Words
Chart (2007)	Peak position
Canadian Albums (Billboard)	3
Canadian Alternative Albums (Nielsen)	1

=== Year end charts ===
Year-end performance for Famous Last Words
Chart (2007)	Peak position
Canadian Albums (Billboard)	66

== Certifications ==
Certifications and sales for Famous Last Words
Region	Certification	Certified units/sales
Canada (Music Canada)	Platinum	100,000^{^}
^{^} Shipments figures based on certification alone.

== Release history ==
Release formats for Famous Last Words
Region	Date	Format(s)	Edition	Label	Ref.
Canada	October 30, 2007	Digital download	Standard	Universal Music Canada	
Canada	October 30, 2007	Digital download	iTunes bonus track	Universal Music Canada	
Canada	November 6, 2007	CD	Standard	Universal Music Canada	
United States	May 12, 2009	Digital download	USA Standard	Fontana	
