= Cha-Ching =

2009 single by Hedley

Single by Hedley

from the album The Show Must Go
- Released: August 17, 2009
- Recorded: 2009
- Genre: Dance pop
- Length: 3:32
- Label: Universal Music Canada
- Songwriter: Brian Howes
- Producer: Howes

Hedley singles chronology
"Dying to Live Again" (2008)	"Cha-Ching" (2009)	"Don't Talk to Strangers" (2009)

Music video
- "Cha-Ching" on YouTube

"Cha-Ching" is a song by Canadian pop rock group Hedley. It was released to radio on August 17, 2009, as the lead single from the band's third studio album The Show Must Go. The song entered the Canadian Hot 100 at number 34, and ended up reaching the top ten at number six.

== Composition ==
"Cha-Ching" was written and produced by Brian Howes. According to Jacob Hoggard in an interview with MuchMusic, the song is about people who thought about becoming famous and how far they are willing to go to achieve that. The song also speaks about reality television shows being fabricated, and references several TV shows and stars. Hoggard stated, "It's essentially about how far you're willing to go for fame. At the same time, we're taking the piss out of ourselves. After all, we're trying to be famous too. Satire makes it easier to maintain your grasp on reality."

== Release ==
"Cha-Ching" was serviced to contemporary hit radio on August 17, 2009. The song was released digitally the following day.

== Performances ==
On February 28, 2010, Hedley performed the song at the closing ceremonies of the 2010 Winter Olympics in Vancouver, with altered lyrics referencing the 2010 Winter Olympics, as well as the 2014 Winter Olympics. The band also performed the song during their halftime performance at the 2013 Grey Cup game.

== Music video ==
The music video was filmed on August 24, 2009, in Liberty Village, Toronto, and was directed by Sean Michael Turrell. The video was released on September 16, 2009, premiering on MuchMusic. In the video, the band portrays as themselves and greedy executives, cashing in on fame-seeking contestants. The band is also shown performing, as well as mocking the TV shows and celebrities referenced in the song.

== Cultural references ==
- The Real World
- American Idol/Canadian Idol
- The Biggest Loser
- Survivor
- Kim Kardashian
- Tila Tequila
- Flavor Flav
- Verne Troyer/Mini Me
- The Hills
- MTV
- TMZ
- Playboy

== Awards and nominations ==
Awards and nominations for "Cha-Ching"
Year	Organization	Award	Result	Ref(s)
2010	MuchMusic Video Awards	Pop Video of the Year	Won	
2011	Juno Awards	Producer of the Year	Nominated	

== Charts ==
=== Weekly charts ===
Weekly chart performance for "Cha-Ching"
Chart (2009–2010)	Peak position
Australia Hitseekers (ARIA)	16
Canada (Canadian Hot 100)	6
Canada CHR/Top 40 (Billboard)	7
Canada Hot AC (Billboard)	2

=== Year-end charts ===
Year-end chart performance for "Cha-Ching"
Chart (2009)	Position
Canada (Canadian Hot 100)	58
Chart (2010)	Position
Canada (Canadian Hot 100)	93

== Release history ==
Release history for "Cha-Ching"
Region	Date	Format	Label	Ref.
Canada	August 17, 2009	Contemporary hit radio	Universal Music Canada	
Various	August 18, 2009	Digital download	Universal Music Canada	
