= All Day with It =

Studio album by illScarlett
- Released: July 9, 2007
- Recorded: NRG Recording Studios, Los Angeles, California; Hallelujah Studio, Los Angeles, California; The Warehouse Studio, Vancouver, B.C. Sterling Sound Studio, New York, New York
- Genres: Ska punk, Reggae rock, Alternative rock
- Length: 36:26
- Label: Sony BMG Canada
- Producer: Matthew Wilder

IllScarlett chronology
EPdemic (2006)	All Day with It (2007)	1UP! (2009)

Singles from All Day with It
- 1. "Nothing Special" Released: July 9, 2007; 2. "Life of a Soldier" Released: October 2007; 3. "Who's Got It?" Released: 2008

Professional ratings
Review scores
Source	Rating
AbsolutePunk	(78%)
Toronto Star	2/4 stars
World of Music	3/5 stars

All Day with It is the third studio album by illScarlett, released on July 10, 2007. It was released in a standard edition containing one disk and as a limited edition which contained a second disk filled with bonus songs. illScarlett has gained growing popularity with this album and the first single, "Nothing Special", as the song reached #87 on the Billboard Canadian Hot 100 and #1 on the MuchMusic Countdown. The second single was "Life of a Soldier" and the third single was "Who's Got It?"

== Track listing ==
No.	Title	Length
1.	"Who's Got It?"	3:33
2.	"Nothing Special"	3:28
3.	"Clearer Now"	2:55
4.	"Life of a Soldier"	3:55
5.	"Pacino"	2:59
6.	"NTF"	3:46
7.	"The Fashion (Do or Die)"	4:13
8.	"Wake Up"	2:31
9.	"Paradise Burning"	4:00
10.	"Danse Macabre"	5:06
11.	"Messed Up" (Bonus Track)	2:54

Ultimate Collector's Edition Bonus Disc

No.	Title	Length
1.	"Heaters" (Live at Orange Lounge)	2:54
2.	"Nothing Special" (Live at Orange Lounge)	3:30
3.	"NTF" (Live at Orange Lounge)	3:35
4.	"Who's Got It?" (Live at Orange Lounge)	2:54
5.	"One-A" (Live at Orange Lounge)	3:57
6.	"Her and I" (Unreleased B-Side)	3:56
7.	"Babylon Song" (Unreleased B-Side)	3:59
8.	"Heaters" (Sony Studio Acoustic)	2:58
9.	"One-A" (Sony Studio Acoustic)	3:45
10.	"Mary Jane" (Sony Studio Acoustic)	3:39
11.	"First Shot" (Sony Studio Acoustic)	3:08

== Charts ==
=== Album ===
Chart	Position
Canadian Albums Chart	41
Alternative Canadian Albums Chart	17

=== Singles ===
Single	Chart	Position
"Nothing Special"	Billboard Canadian Hot 100	87
"Life of a Soldier"	Billboard Canadian Hot 100	71

== Personnel ==
=== A&R ===
- Greg Boggs
- Adam Fujiki - Production Coordinator

=== Art/Photography ===
- Adrian Forrow - Illustrations
- John Wellman - Graphic Design
- Richard Sibbald - Photography

=== Instruments ===
- Alex Norman - Guitar
- Johnny Doherty - Bass
- Swavek Piorkowski - Drums
- Will Marr - Guitar

=== Mixing/Engineering ===
- Mike Fraser - Mixer
- Csaba Petocz - Engineer

=== Producing/Mastering ===
- Matthew Wilder - Producer
- Ted Jensen - Mastering

=== Vocalists ===
- Alex Norman - Lead
- Johnny Doherty - Background

== Certifications ==
Certifications and sales for All Day with It
Region	Certification	Certified units/sales
Canada (Music Canada)	Gold	50,000^{^}
^{^} Shipments figures based on certification alone.
