= 1UP! =

Studio album by illScarlett
- Released: September 29, 2009
- Recorded: Glenwood Place Studios, Burbank, California; Solar Powered Plastic Plant, Los Angeles, California and Metalworks Studios, Mississauga, Ontario
- Genre: Ska punk Reggae rock Alternative rock Pop rock
- Label: Sony Music Canada
- Producer: Robert Carranza, illScarlett

IllScarlett chronology
All Day With It (2007)	1UP! (2009)	2012 EP (2012)

Singles from 1UP!
- 1. "Take It for Granted" Released: August 6, 2009; 2. "Milkshakes & Razorblades" Released: 2010

Professional ratings
Review scores
Source	Rating
ChartAttack	2.5/5 stars
ThePunkSite	3/5 stars
Rock Lifestyle	4/5 stars

1UP! is the fourth studio album by ska band illScarlett, released on September 29, 2009, in North America. The first single on the album is titled "Take It for Granted" and was first released on the band's website on August 6, 2009. The album debuted at #26 on the Canadian Albums Chart.

== Track listing ==
No.	Title	Length
1.	"Take It for Granted"	2:59
2.	"Extra, Extra!"	3:09
3.	"Funky Reputation"	2:56
4.	"Get Famous (Tonight)"	2:35
5.	"Milkshakes & Razorblades" (featuring Kardinal Offishall)	4:23
6.	"Freezing"	5:34
7.	"Can't Sleep"	4:23
8.	"Too Sure"	4:08
9.	"Nothing Once Again"	3:33
10.	"Sorry"	3:46
11.	"Easy"	3:13
12.	"1UP!"	3:03
13.	"Good Thing" (iTunes exclusive)	3:12

== Personnel ==
=== A&R ===
- Greg Boggs

=== Art/photography ===
- Swavek Piorkowski — art direction, photography
- John Wellman — design, layout
- Margaret Malandruccolo — photography

=== Instruments ===
- Alex Norman — guitar
- Swavek Piorkowski — drums
- Will Marr — guitar
- John Doherty — bass
- Anthony Carone — keyboard

=== Mixing/engineering ===
- Robert Carranza

=== Producing/mastering/management ===
- Robert Carranza — producer
- illScarlett — co-producers
- Chris Gehringer — mastering
- Andy Winkler — management

=== Vocalists ===
- Alex Norman — lead
- Swavek Piorkowski — background
- John Doherty — background
- Anthony Carrone — background
