= She's So Sorry =

Single by Hedley

from the album Famous Last Words
- Released: August 21, 2007
- Studio: Rock Beach Recording (White Rock); Hipposonic Studios (Vancouver); The Warehouse Studio (Vancouver)
- Genre: Rock
- Length: 3:36
- Label: Universal Canada
- Songwriters: Jacob Hoggard; Dave Rosin; Tommy Mac; Chris Crippin; Brian Howes
- Producers: Greig Nori; Dave Genn

Hedley singles chronology
"Street Fight" (2006)	"She's So Sorry" (2007)	"For the Nights I Can't Remember" (2007)

Music video
- "She's So Sorry" on YouTube

"She's So Sorry" is a song by the Canadian pop rock band Hedley. It was released on August 21, 2007, as the lead single from their second studio album, Famous Last Words. A music video for the song was released in 2007, and topped the MuchMusic Countdown chart.

== Background ==
"She's So Sorry" was written by Jacob Hoggard, Dave Rosin, Tommy Mac, Chris Crippin and Brian Howes while production was handled by Greig Nori and Dave Genn. It was recorded at Rock Beach Recording in White Rock, British Columbia, and at Hipposonic Studios and The Warehouse Studio in Vancouver. The track is about sending a "piss-off send-off to an ex."

The music video for "She's So Sorry" premiered in 2007 and was directed by Kevin De Freitas. The video was shot in August 2007. The video was nominated for the MuchMusic Video Award for Best Cinematography, but lost to "For the Nights I Can't Remember" and won the Best Rock Video award.

== Awards and nominations ==
Awards and nominations for "She's So Sorry"
Year	Organization	Award	Result	Ref(s)
2008	MuchMusic Video Awards	Best Cinematography	Nominated	
2008	MuchMusic Video Awards	Best Rock Video	Won	

== Personnel ==
Credits for "She's So Sorry" adapted from the Famous Last Words booklet.

Hedley

- Jacob Hoggard – lead vocals
- Dave Rosin – guitar
- Tommy Mac – bass guitar
- Chris Crippin – drums, percussion

Additional musicians

- Brian Howes – guitar
- Sal Ferreres – percussion
- Dave Genn – guitar, keyboard
- Ben Kaplan – keyboard

Production

- Greig Nori – producer
- Dave Genn – producer
- Mike Fraser – mixing
- Dean Maher – engineering
- Brian Gardner – mastering

== Charts ==
Chart performance for "She's So Sorry"
Chart (2007–08)	Peak position
Canada (Canadian Hot 100)	50
Canada CHR/Top 40 (Billboard)	48

== Release history ==
Release history for "She's So Sorry"
Region	Date	Format	Label	Ref.
Canada	August 21, 2007	Contemporary hit radio	Universal Canada	
Canada	2008	CD	Universal Canada	
