= Don't Talk to Strangers (Hedley song) =

Single by Hedley

from the album The Show Must Go
- Released: October 27, 2009
- Recorded: 2009
- Genre: Pop rock
- Length: 3:34
- Label: Universal Music Canada
- Songwriter(s): Chris Crippin; Jacob Hoggard; Brian Howes; Tommy Mac; Dave Rosin; Jason Van Poederooyen
- Producer(s): Howes

Hedley singles chronology
"Cha-Ching" (2009)	"Don't Talk to Strangers" (2009)	"Perfect" (2010)

Music video
- "Don't Talk to Strangers" on YouTube

"Don't Talk to Strangers" is a song by Canadian pop rock band Hedley. It was released as the second single on October 27, 2009, from their third studio album, The Show Must Go. The song at number 11 on the Canadian Hot 100. The song received the SOCAN Music No. 1 Song Award in 2010.

== Composition ==
"Don't Talk to Strangers" was written by Hedley and Jason Van Poederooyen while production was handled by Brian Howes who also co-wrote the track. The song is a rap-influenced track, and features a more darker refrain. Speaking about the song, Hoggard stated;

"That song may or may not have been inspired by a cougar experience. This was one of those videos where the plot unfolded as we delved into the lyrics. My favourite part is actually the bridge. It's kind of like Nine Inch Nails. It's just a really fun song."

== Music video ==
The music video was released in November 2009 and was directed by Colin Minihan. The premise of the video tells a story of why you shouldn't talk to strangers, as "they could kidnap you and torture you with jumper cables." The video has the band being kept hostage by a psychotic but attractive middle-aged woman. She uses the band for entertainment and sexual pleasure, killing them and throwing them into the back of her trunk in the end. Chart Attack compared the video to 1967 comedy drama film, The Graduate.

== Awards and nominations ==
Awards and nominations for "Don't Talk to Strangers"
Year	Organization	Award	Result	Ref(s)
2010	SOCAN Music Awards	SOCAN No. 1 Song Award	Won	

== Charts ==
=== Weekly charts ===
Weekly chart performance for "Don't Talk to Strangers"
Chart (2009–10)	Peak position
Canada (Canadian Hot 100)	11
Canada CHR/Top 40 (Billboard)	8
Canada Hot AC (Billboard)	8

=== Year-end charts ===
Year-end chart performance for "Don't Talk to Strangers"
Chart (2010)	Position
Canada (Canadian Hot 100)	54

== Release history ==
Release history for "Don't Talk to Strangers"
Region	Date	Format	Label	Ref.
Canada	October 27, 2009	Contemporary hit radio	Universal Music Canada	
