= For the Nights I Can't Remember =

Single by Hedley

from the album Famous Last Words
- B-side: "Never Too Late"
- Released: November 2007
- Recorded: 2007
- Genre: Pop rock; soft rock
- Length: 4:01
- Label: Universal Canada
- Songwriter(s): Greig Nori; Chris Crippin; Jacob Hoggard; Dave Rosin; Dave Genn; Tommy Mac
- Producer(s): Greig Nori; Dave Genn

Hedley singles chronology
"She's So Sorry" (2007)	"For the Nights I Can't Remember" (2007)	"Never Too Late" (2008)

Music video
- "For The Nights I Can't Remember" on YouTube

"For the Nights I Can't Remember" is a song recorded by Canadian pop rock band Hedley for their second studio album, Famous Last Words (2007). The ballad was co-written by the members of the band with the record's producers, Greig Nori and Dave Genn. It was released in November 2007, as the album's second single. In 2009, the song was re-issued digitally with their follow-up single.

Following its release, the song reached a peak of six on the Billboard Canadian Hot 100, making it the group's first top-10 single on the then-new chart. It also reached number one on the Canadian Hot AC airplay chart. "For the Nights I Can't Remember" went on to be named the ninth most-played song on Canadian radio in 2008, according to Nielsen Company, and also earned the band multiple music awards.

== Composition ==
"For the Nights I Can't Remember" is a pop rock love ballad produced by Greig Nori and Dave Genn which lasts for four minutes and one second. According to the sheet music published by Universal Music Publishing Group, the song is composed in the key of C major and set in compound duple time (6/8) to an approximate tempo of 72 BPM. Hoggard's vocals span a two-octave range, from the note of E_{3} through E_{5}. The song follows a non-repeating chord progression and is instrumented primarily by piano. The track also features influences of a modern rock and R&B sound.

Lyrically, the song finds Hoggard pleading to his lover for forgiveness for the time he's spent away. "I do want to love you ... And I do want to try," he insists on the chorus, while in the bridge he voices regret over "the nights [he] can't remember." According to Hoggard in a 2011 interview with the Toronto Sun, the group wanted to experiment and diversify their sound; "Two records ago we said, 'Let's try a piano song. Let's do a piano ballad...' We took some liberties and we took some chances."

== Accolades ==
"For the Nights I Can't Remember" garnered three awards at the 2009 Canadian Radio Music Awards: Fan's Choice, Song of the Year, and the Chart Topper Award. The song also earned Hedley the Pop Music award for songwriting at the 2009 SOCAN Awards.

== Chart performance ==
"For the Nights I Can't Remember" debuted at number 24 on the Canadian Hot 100 chart dated November 17, 2007, the week's second-highest debut. It reached a peak position of six in its eighth week, on the chart dated January 5, 2008, where it was the highest-charting Canadian single. The song spent 39 weeks on the chart.

It was the ninth most-played song on Canadian radio in 2008, according to numbers released by Nielsen Company. The song's airplay also contributed to Hedley being the second most-played act (and most-played Canadian) for that year. On a chart compiled by CBC Music, also based on numbers reported by Nielsen, "For the Nights I Can't Remember" was listed as the 61st most-played song on Canadian radio between January 1, 2001 and July 2015.

== Music video ==
An accompanying music video for the song was directed by Kevin De Freitas and choreographed by Samy Inayeh; it premiered January 8, 2008. It was shot in November 2007. The clip starts off with a battered Jacob Hoggard getting photographed for a mug shot. It cuts to his girlfriend who waits patiently for him, intercut with scenes of Hoggard getting involved an alley fight. The band is also shown playing in a club, accompanied by back-up singers, with his girlfriend arriving to see him. One scene shows the girl looking at a letter from Jacob with the chorus written in; the first line in the chorus is then shown on a music sheet where Jacob performs on piano.

=== Reception ===
The video for "For the Nights I Can't Remember" won the awards for Best Video, Best Director (for Kevin De Freitas), and Best Cinematography (for Samy Inayeh) at the 2008 MuchMusic Video Awards. This made them the most-awarded act at that ceremony with four wins, including one (Best Rock Video) for "She's So Sorry".

== Track listing ==
Never Too Late / For the Nights I Can't Remember Digital 7"
No.	Title	Writer(s)	Length
1.	"Never Too Late"	Greig Nori; Chris Crippin; Jacob Hoggard; Dave Rosin; Tommy Mac	4:00
2.	"For the Nights I Can't Remember"	Nori; Crippin; Hoggard; Rosin; Dave Genn; Mac	4:02
Total length:			8:02

== Usage in media ==
"For the Nights I Can't Remember" was used as the dance music for two performances on the American dance competition series So You Think You Can Dance.

== Charts ==
=== Weekly charts ===
Weekly chart performance for "For the Nights I Can't Remember"
Chart (2007–08)	Peak position
Canada (Canadian Hot 100)	6
Canada AC (Billboard)	13
Canada CHR/Top 40 (Billboard)	4
Canada Hot AC (Billboard)	1

=== Year end charts ===
Year-end performance for "For the Nights I Can't Remember"
Chart (2008)	Position
Canada (Canadian Hot 100)	14
Canada Hot AC (Billboard)	2

== Release history ==
Release dates and formats for "For the Nights I Can't Remember"
Region	Date	Format	Label	Ref.
Canada	November 2007	Contemporary hit radio	Universal Music Canada	
Various	July 14, 2009	Digital download	Universal Music Canada	
