= Old School (Hedley song) =

Single by Hedley

from the album Famous Last Words/Never Too Late
- Released: August 2008
- Recorded: 2007
- Genre: Pop punk; rock
- Length: 3:41
- Label: Universal Music Canada
- Songwriters: Chris Crippin; Jacob Hoggard; Tommy Mac; Dave Rosin; Dave Genn
- Producers: Greig Nori; Dave Genn

Hedley singles chronology
"Never Too Late" (2008)	"Old School" (2008)	"Dying to Live Again" (2008)

"Old School" is a song by Canadian pop rock group Hedley. It was released in August 2008 as the fourth single from their second studio album, Famous Last Words. The song was serviced to contemporary hit radio in the United States on March 31, 2009.

== Background ==
In an interview with Muskoka Region, singer Jacob Hoggard said of the song; "That's about every guy that's ever had a group of friends and now he's got a job and two-and-a-half kids and all the responsibilities of life. It's such a nostalgic song. It's every working man's song."

== Composition ==
"Old School" was written by Chris Crippin, Jacob Hoggard, Dave Rosin, Tommy Mac and Dave Genn. It was produced by Greig Nori and Genn. The song has been described as melancholy with nostalgic lyrics.

== Chart performance ==
"Old School" debuted at number 100 on the Canadian Hot 100 for the week ending July 19, 2008, before it was officially released as a single in August 2008. The song later peaked at number 10. The song also reached number nine and number three on the Canada CHR/Top 40 and Canada Hot AC airplay charts, respectively.

== Personnel ==
Credits for "Old School" adapted from album's liner notes.

Hedley

- Jacob Hoggard – vocals
- Tommy Mac – bass guitar, backing vocals
- Dave Rosin – guitar, backing vocals
- Chris Crippin – drums, backing vocals

Additional musicians

- Gillian Mott – violin
- Joshua Belvedere – violin
- Bernard Kane – viola
- Alexandra Sia – cello
- Sal Ferreres – percussion
- Dave Genn – guitar, keyboards
- Ben Kaplan – additional keyboards

Production

- Greig Nori – producer
- Dave Genn – producer
- Mike Fraser – mixing
- Dean Maher – engineering
- Brian Gardner – mastering
- Alex Aligizakis – additional recording
- Dave Ottoson – recording, mixing
- Shawn O'Hara – assistant engineer
- Brendon Brown – assistant engineers
- Brock McFarlane – assistant engineer
- Chris Michael – assistant engineer
- Eric Mosher – assistant engineer

== Charts ==
=== Weekly charts ===
Weekly chart performance for "Old School"
Chart (2008)	Peak position
Canada (Canadian Hot 100)	10
Canada CHR/Top 40 (Billboard)	9
Canada Hot AC (Billboard)	3

=== Year-end charts ===
Year-end performance for "Old School"
Chart (2008)	Position
Canada (Canadian Hot 100)	61

== Release history ==
Release history for "Old School"
Region	Date	Format	Label	Ref.
United States	March 31, 2009	Contemporary hit radio	Fontana Distribution	
