= IllScarlett =

Canadian rock band

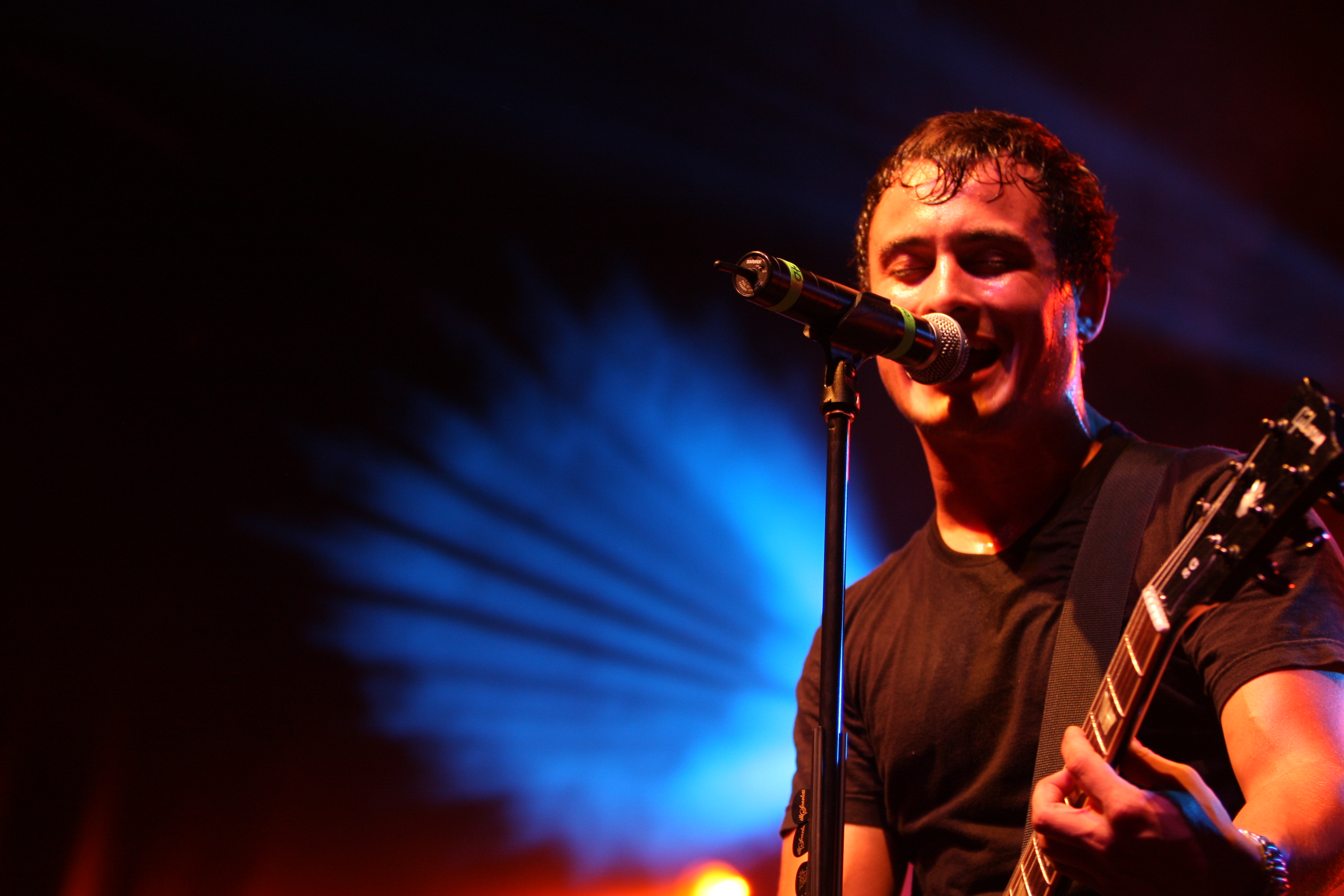
- Illscarlett performing at Carleton University during Froshweek in 2008.

Background information
- Origin: Clarkson, Mississauga, Ontario, Canada
- Genres: Rock, ska punk, reggae fusion, reggae rock, pop rock
- Years active: 2001–present
- Label: Sony Music Canada
- Members: Alex Norman; Swavek Piorkowski; John Doherty; Jake Robertson
- Past members: Justin Zoltek; Daniel Krolikowski; Pat Kennedy; Will Marr; CJ Hinds
- Website: illscarlett.com

IllScarlett (styled as illScarlett; /ˌɪlˈskɑːrlɪt/) is a Canadian rock and reggae band formed in 2001. Their most prominent influence is California-based band Sublime.

The band found their break when they set up their equipment (using a generator) and played for concertgoers waiting in line to enter the 2004 Vans Warped Tour venue in Barrie, Ontario. Kevin Lyman, the Warped Tour organizer and co-owner of Warcon Enterprises, noticed them and invited them to play at his personal barbecue. Subsequently, they were offered spots on the tour for the following two years.

IllScarlett has five major studio albums: ILLP, Clearly in Another Fine Mess, All Day With It, 1UP!, and most recently illScarlett. The album All Day With It reached gold status in Canada.

== History ==
illScarlett was formed by drummer Swavek Piorkowski and singer/guitarist Alex Norman, who met while attending Iona Catholic Secondary School in the Clarkson area of Mississauga, Ontario. Around the same time, Norman was working at a skateboarding shop at the local mall. Norman approached a customer named Daniel Krolikowski after mistaking Krolikowski for bassist Jason "Cone" McCaslin of the popular band Sum 41; despite the mistaken identity, Norman discovered that Krolikowski also played bass guitar. The two became friends and thereafter began jamming with Piorkowski as a trio.

The name "illScarlett" was based on a local street called Will Scarlett Drive: the band stole the street sign as a prank and removed the "W", leaving the name "ill Scarlett Drive".

Soon after illScarlett was formed, the trio began to seek additional members. They recruited guitarist Will Marr and disc jockey Pat Kennedy. The band played its first show at the Horseshoe Tavern in Toronto, Ontario with stand-in John Doherty, son of singer Denny Doherty, on guitar (Doherty would replace Krolikowski as the band's bassist some years later).

After many performances at small venues, illScarlett went into the studio to record their first demo called the Five Dollar Demo. The demo was recorded at Metalworks Studios in Mississauga, Ontario. In 2004, the band released a full-length CD titled iLLP. Shortly after the release of ILLP, the band performed in the parking lot for the 2004 Vans Warped Tour in Barrie, Ontario. They weren't actually scheduled to play inside the venue, but they set up their equipment beside the line where people were waiting to get into Park Place for the concert, using a generator to power their equipment. IllScarlett played an hour and a half set for the concertgoers.

Within three songs, they got word from one of their friends that Sublime's old roadie who worked as tour security radioed the organizer of the Warped Tour, Kevin Lyman, telling him that there was a band sounding like Sublime playing in the parking lot powered by generators. Lyman asked the band to play at his private barbecue later that night; the band accepted his offer. After the band's performance at the barbecue, Lyman extended an invitation for the band to perform a few dates on the 2005 Vans Warped Tour.

In September 2006, the band played at the inaugural Virgin Festival in Toronto. By October 2006, the band had sold 15,000 copies of self-released CDs. On October 31, 2006, the band released the EP, EPdemic.

In August 2007 and 2008, the band played at the Cutting Edge Music Festival in Grand Bend.

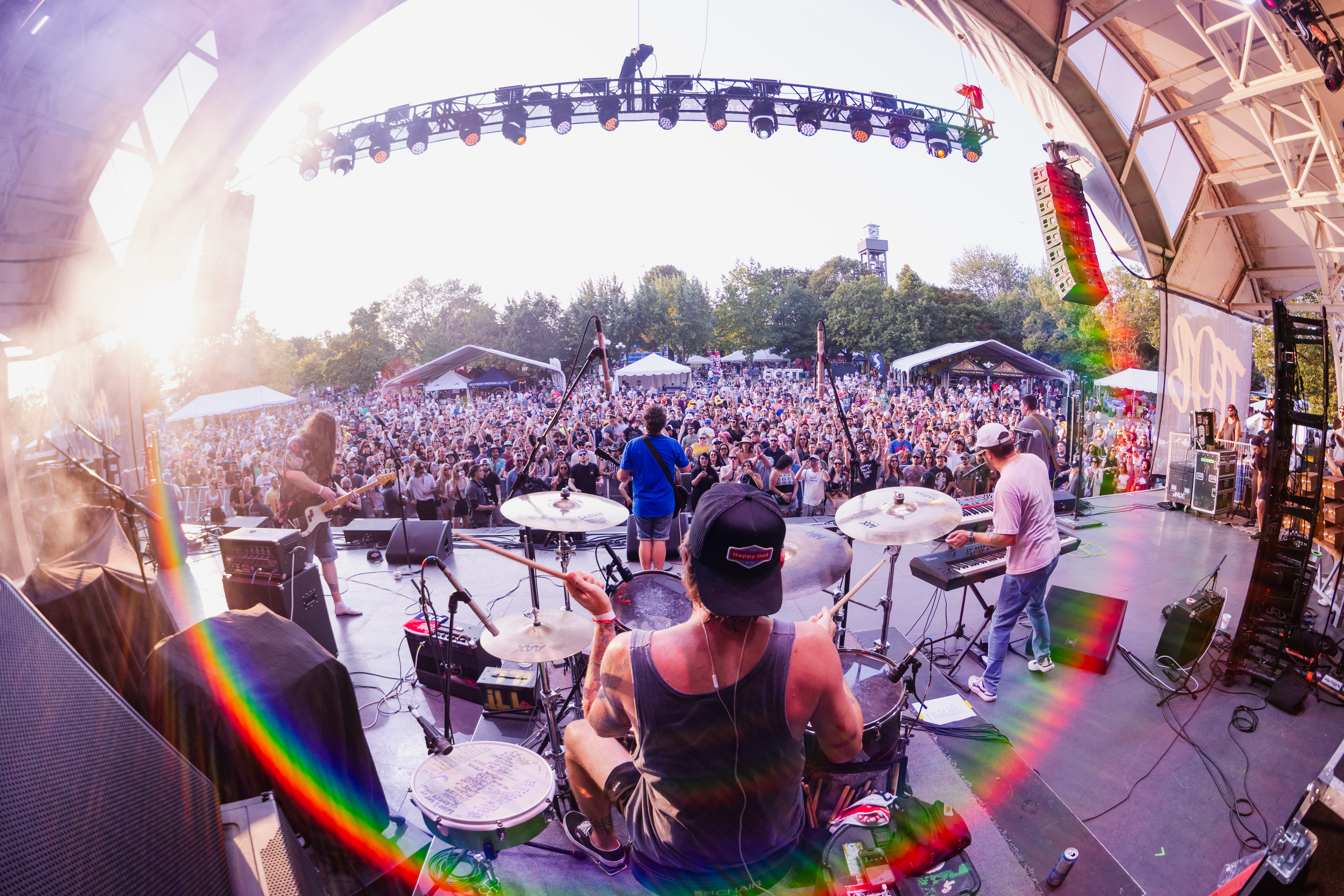

In August 2009 the band played at Cutting Edge Music Festival in Kitchener.

The band finished recording their first major-label album (All Day with It) in Los Angeles, California under the production of Matthew Wilder, producer of No Doubt's diamond Tragic Kingdom album. The new album was released on July 10, 2007 across North America. The album includes such hit songs such as "Who's Got It?", "Paradise Burning", and "Life of a Soldier". Also on the album are redone versions of the songs "Nothing Special", "NTF" (Next Time Forever), "Clearer Now", and Pacino. IllScarlett toured Canada, Japan, Germany, the United States, and throughout Europe, promoting the album All Day with It.

On September 29, 2009, the band released their follow-up album to All Day with It titled 1UP!. This album featured singles such as, Take it for Granted and Milkshakes & Razorblades.

== Awards and nominations ==
Year	Event	Award(s) Up For	Result
2006	CASBY Awards	Favourite New Artist	Nominated
2006	CASBY Awards	Favourite New Indie Release	Nominated
2008	MuchMusic Video Awards	Best Video, Best Rock Video, Best Post-Production, and Best Director: ("Nothing Special"), People's Choice: Favourite Canadian Group	Nominated
2008	Juno Awards	New Group of the Year	Nominated

IllScarlett's song "Who's Got It" was selected as the official song for the 2007 FIFA U-20 World Cup soccer tournament hosted in Canada.

== Members ==
Current members

- Alex Norman – lead vocals, rhythm guitars
- Swavek Piorkowski – drums
- Jake Robertson - lead guitar
- John Doherty – bass guitar, backing vocals

Former members

- Will Marr – lead guitar
- Justin Zoltek – guitar
- Daniel Krolikowski – bass guitar, backing vocals
- Pat Kennedy – disc jockey/turntablist
- CJ Hinds – bass guitar, backing vocals

Touring members

- Geoff Willingham – lead guitar (2013–2014)

== Discography ==
=== Studio albums ===
- 2003: Streetsville: Masonic Lodge Handout
- 2004: iLLP
- 2006: Clearly in Another Fine Mess
- 2007: All Day with It (gold status in Canada)
- 2009: 1UP!
- 2014: illScarlett

=== EPs ===
- 2006: EPdemic
- 2012: 2012 EP
