= Never Too Late (Hedley song) =

Single by Hedley

from the album Famous Last Words
- Released: April 4, 2008
- Recorded: 2007
- Genre: Ska; soft rock; alternative rock; reggae
- Length: 4:00
- Label: Universal Music Canada; Fontana Distribution
- Songwriters: Chris Crippin; Jacob Hoggard; Tommy Mac; Dave Rosin
- Producers: Greig Nori; Dave Genn

Hedley singles chronology
"For the Nights I Can't Remember" (2007)	"Never Too Late" (2008)	"Old School" (2008)

Music video
- "Never Too Late" on YouTube

"Never Too Late" is a song by Canadian pop punk group Hedley. It was released on April 4, 2008, as the third single from their second studio album Famous Last Words. It was featured on the US release of the album known as Never Too Late.

== Background and composition ==
"Never Too Late" is about not giving up and starting over again when things go wrong.

The song was written by Chris Crippin, Jacob Hoggard, Tommy Mac and Dave Rosin, while production was handled by Greig Nori and Dave Genn. Critics have described the track as ska and reggae.

== Music video ==
The music video for "Never Too Late" premiered on April 4, 2008, on MuchOnDemand. The video was shot in March 2008, in Barbados and is close to a shot-for-shot remake/parody of the music video that Duran Duran filmed for their 1982 single, "Rio". Hoggard spoke about the music video.

"We made it identical to Duran Duran's 'Rio'. To the best of our abilities, we made it identical. That was really important for us, to do it justice and not just kind of cop it out. If we were going to do it, we wanted to make sure that we did it. So we were so happy. That's kind of one of the points of my, if you want to call it a career, where I was like, 'Wow, I really feel like I did something cool there.'"

According to numbers released by Nielsen Company, the music video was the most-aired music video on Canadian media in 2008.

== Track listing ==
Digital download – single
No.	Title	Length
1.	"Never Too Late"	4:00
2.	"For the Nights I Can't Remember"	4:02

== Personnel ==
Credits for "Never Too Late" adapted from the Famous Last Words booklet.

Hedley

- Jacob Hoggard – vocals
- Tommy Mac – bass guitar, backing vocals
- Dave Rosin – lead guitar, backing vocals
- Chris Crippin – drums, backing vocals

Additional musicians

- Dave Genn – guitar, keyboards
- Ben Kaplan – keyboards
- Ray Garraway – drums
- Sal Ferreres – percussion

Production

- Greig Nori – producer
- Dave Genn – producer
- Mike Fraser – mixing
- Dean Maher – engineering

== Charts ==
=== Weekly charts ===
Weekly chart performance for "Never Too Late"
Chart (2008)	Peak position
Canada (Canadian Hot 100)	4
Canada CHR/Top 40 (Billboard)	5
Canada Hot AC (Billboard)	2

=== Year-end charts ===
Year-end chart performance for "Never Too Late"
Chart (2008)	Position
Canada (Canadian Hot 100)	23
Canada CHR/Top 40 (Billboard)	19
Canada Hot AC (Billboard)	14

== Release history ==
Release dates and formats for "Never Too Late"
Region	Date	Format	Label	Ref.
Canada	April 4, 2008	CD	Universal Music Canada	
Various	July 14, 2009	Digital download	Fontana Distribution	
