= Countdown (Canadian TV program) =

Canadian television program (1996–2017)

- Also known as: Coca-Cola Countdown; Much Countdown
- Genre: Music
- Created by: Moses Znaimer
- Country of origin: Canada
- Original language: English
- No. of seasons: 22
- No. of episodes: 1,144

Production
- Executive producer: Moses Znaimer
- Running time: 60 minutes
- Production companies: CHUM Television (1996-2007); CTVglobemedia/Bell Media (2007-2017)

Original release
- Network: MuchMusic
- Release: January 1, 1996 – November 17, 2017

The Much Countdown (also known as the Much Top 30 Countdown, and formerly known as The MuchMusic Top 20 Countdown) is an hour-long musical television program, usually hosted by a VJ, that aired on Canadian music television station MuchMusic from 1996 to 2017. Countdown was one of the longest-running programs that has aired on MuchMusic since the channel's debut. Originally sponsored by Coca-Cola, it was known for the first several years as the Coca-Cola Countdown.

== Format ==
The program aired a playlist of the most well-known songs in the mainstream in Canada. The order that the videos were played went from No. 30 to No. 1, although only about a dozen or so of those videos were actually played. The countdown usually followed certain rules regarding what videos it played and its structure:

- The entire Top 10 was played, regardless of how the song was moving on the chart
- Other videos that got played were big rising songs or songs that were debuting on the chart, with one exception (Slipknot's "Left Behind", which was later played when it peaked at 13).
- Debuting songs always rose at least one spot the next week, the only exception was Mase's "Lookin' at Me"
- After debuting, songs would rise until they hit No. 1 or they stall at a certain position, by remaining at that position for a second week in a row or by falling down the chart.
- After a song stalls, it begins falling off the chart and never recovers, with a few exceptions
- The chart program led off with the debuting songs, the only exception was when "4AM" by Our Lady Peace led off the February 6, 1998 edition in its second week on the chart because the only debut that week was Celine Dion's "My Heart Will Go On" at No. 22

== Number ones ==
Here is a listing of number ones from 1996 onwards:

=== 1996 ===
Date	Weeks @ No. 1	Song	Performer
5 January 1996	No chart		
12 January 1996	1	"You Remind Me of Something"	R. Kelly
19 January 1996	1	"Exhale (Shoop Shoop)"	Whitney Houston
26 January 1996	2	"One Sweet Day"	Mariah Carey & Boyz II Men
9 February 1996	3	"Wonderwall"	Oasis
1 March 1996	4	"Ironic"	Alanis Morissette
29 March 1996	1	"1979"	The Smashing Pumpkins
5 April 1996	1	"Sleepy Maggie"	Ashley MacIsaac
12 April 1996	1	"Big Me"	Foo Fighters
19 April 1996	1	"1, 2, 3, 4 (Sumpin' New)"	Coolio
26 April 1996	1	"Nobody Knows"	The Tony Rich Project
3 May 1996	1	"Champagne Supernova"	Oasis
10 May 1996	2	"Big Bang Baby"	Stone Temple Pilots
24 May 1996	2	"Old Man & Me (When I Get to Heaven)"	Hootie & the Blowfish
7 June 1996	2	"Killing Me Softly"	Fugees featuring Lauryn Hill
21 June 1996	2	"Ahead by a Century"	The Tragically Hip
5 July 1996	1	"Tha Crossroads"	Bone Thugs-n-Harmony
12 July 1996	1	"Fastlove"	George Michael
19 July 1996	2	"You Learn"	Alanis Morissette
2 August 1996	1	"Give Me One Reason"	Tracy Chapman
9 August 1996	1	"Until It Sleeps"	Metallica
16 August 1996	1	"Don't Look Back in Anger"	Oasis
23 August 1996	1	"You're Makin' Me High"	Toni Braxton
30 August 1996	2	"That Girl"	Maxi Priest featuring Shaggy
13 September 1996	1	"Where It's At"	Beck
20 September 1996	1	"Gift Shop"	The Tragically Hip
27 September 1996	2	"I Love You Always Forever"	Donna Lewis
11 October 1996	2	"Spiderwebs"	No Doubt
25 October 1996	1	"E-Bow the Letter"	R.E.M.
1 November 1996	1	"If It Makes You Happy"	Sheryl Crow
8 November 1996	2	"No Diggity"	Blackstreet featuring Dr. Dre
22 November 1996	1	"Aneurysm (Live)"	Nirvana
29 November 1996	1	"How Bizarre"	OMC
6 December 1996	2	"Swallowed"	Bush
20 December 1996	1 of 2	"Don't Speak"	No Doubt
27 December 1996	No chart		

=== 1997 ===
Date	Weeks @ No. 1	Song	Performer
3 January 1997	No chart		
10 January 1997	2 of 2	"Don't Speak"	No Doubt
17 January 1997	2	"Don't Let Go (Love)"	En Vogue
31 January 1997	1	"Lovefool"	The Cardigans
7 February 1997	3	"Wannabe"	Spice Girls
28 February 1997	1	"Discothèque"	U2
7 March 1997	2	"One Headlight"	The Wallflowers
21 March 1997	2	"Say You'll Be There"	Spice Girls
4 April 1997	3	"Superman's Dead"	Our Lady Peace
25 April 1997	1	"Precious Declaration"	Collective Soul
2 May 1997	1	"Your Woman"	White Town
9 May 1997	2	"I Want You"	Savage Garden
23 May 1997	1	"Quit Playing Games (with My Heart)"	Backstreet Boys
30 May 1997	2	"MMMBop"	Hanson
13 June 1997	1	"Hypnotize"	The Notorious B.I.G.
20 June 1997	2	"Clumsy"	Our Lady Peace
4 July 1997	2	"2 Become 1"	Spice Girls
18 July 1997	1	"The Difference"	The Wallflowers
25 July 1997	1	"Bitch"	Meredith Brooks
1 August 1997	1	"Men in Black"	Will Smith
8 August 1997	2	"Do You Know (What It Takes)"	Robyn
22 August 1997	2	"I'll Be Missing You"	Puff Daddy & Faith Evans featuring 112
5 September 1997	1	"Temptation"	The Tea Party
12 September 1997	2	"Building a Mystery"	Sarah McLachlan
26 September 1997	1	"Everybody (Backstreet's Back)"	Backstreet Boys
3 October 1997	1	"D'You Know What I Mean?"	Oasis
10 October 1997	1	"Automatic Flowers"	Our Lady Peace
17 October 1997	1	"Barbie Girl"	Aqua
24 October 1997	2	"Fly"	Sugar Ray featuring Super Cat
7 November 1997	2	"Tubthumping"	Chumbawamba
21 November 1997	1	"4 Seasons of Loneliness"	Boyz II Men
28 November 1997	1	"As Long as You Love Me"	Backstreet Boys
5 December 1997	2	"You Make Me Wanna..."	Usher
19 December 1997	1	"Bitter Sweet Symphony"	The Verve
26 December 1997	No chart		

=== 1998 ===
Date	Weeks @ No. 1	Song	Performer
2 January 1998	No chart		
9 January 1998	2	"Show Me Love"	Robyn
23 January 1998	2	"Lollipop (Candyman)"	Aqua
6 February 1998	2	"Sweet Surrender"	Sarah McLachlan
20 February 1998	1	"Together Again"	Janet
27 February 1998	1	"Truly Madly Deeply"	Savage Garden
6 March 1998	2	"My Heart Will Go On (Love Theme from 'Titanic')"	Celine Dion
20 March 1998	1	"Sex and Candy"	Marcy Playground
27 March 1998	2	"Frozen"	Madonna
10 April 1998	1	"Gettin' Jiggy wit It"	Will Smith
17 April 1998	1	"I Want You Back"	*NSYNC
24 April 1998	1	"All My Life"	K-Ci & JoJo
1 May 1998	1	"Torn"	Natalie Imbruglia
8 May 1998	2	"The Way"	Fastball
22 May 1998	1	"Adia"	Sarah McLachlan
29 May 1998	1	"Release"	The Tea Party
5 June 1998	1	"Stop"	Spice Girls
12 June 1998	1	"Northern Touch"	Rascalz
19 June 1998	1	"Too Close"	Next
26 June 1998	1	"Lucky Man"	The Verve
3 July 1998	1	"Broken Bones"	Love Inc.
10 July 1998	2	"The Boy Is Mine"	Brandy & Monica
24 July 1998	1	"Ray of Light"	Madonna
31 July 1998	2	"Iris"	Goo Goo Dolls
14 August 1998	1	"Ava Adore"	The Smashing Pumpkins
21 August 1998	2	"Poets"	The Tragically Hip
4 September 1998	1	"I Don't Want to Miss a Thing"	Aerosmith
11 September 1998	2	"One Week"	Barenaked Ladies
25 September 1998	1	"Go Deep"	Janet
2 October 1998	1	"Intergalactic"	Beastie Boys
9 October 1998	1	"Crush"	Jennifer Paige
16 October 1998	2	"The First Night"	Monica
30 October 1998	1	"Apparitions"	Matthew Good Band
6 November 1998	1	"The Dope Show"	Marilyn Manson
13 November 1998	2	"Doo Wop (That Thing)"	Lauryn Hill
27 November 1998	1	"Thank U"	Alanis Morissette
4 December 1998	1	"Slide"	Goo Goo Dolls
11 December 1998	1	"Sweetest Thing"	U2
18 December 1998	1	"It's All Been Done"	Barenaked Ladies
25 December 1998	No chart		

=== 1999 ===
Date	Weeks @ No. 1	Song	Performer	Ref
1 January 1999	No Chart			
8 January 1999	5	"...Baby One More Time"	Britney Spears	
12 February 1999	1	"Believe"	Cher	
19 February 1999	2	"Pretty Fly (For a White Guy)"	The Offspring	
5 March 1999	2	"Every Morning"	Sugar Ray	
19 March 1999	2	"Ex-Factor"	Lauryn Hill	
2 April 1999	1	"What It's Like"	Everlast	
9 April 1999	2	"Love Song"	Sky	
23 April 1999	1	"Praise You"	Fatboy Slim	
30 April 1999	1	"My Name Is"	Eminem	
7 May 1999	1	"Why Don't You Get a Job?"	The Offspring	
14 May 1999	1	"Freak on a Leash"	Korn	
21 May 1999	1	"Sucks to Be You"	Prozzäk	
28 May 1999	1	"No Scrubs"	TLC	
4 June 1999	2	"Livin' la Vida Loca"	Ricky Martin	
18 June 1999	2	"I Want It That Way"	Backstreet Boys	
2 July 1999	1	"Sometimes"	Britney Spears	
9 July 1999	1	"Wild Wild West"	Will Smith featuring Dru Hill & Kool Moe Dee	
16 July 1999	1	"Beautiful Stranger"	Madonna	
23 July 1999	1	"If You Had My Love"	Jennifer Lopez	
30 July 1999	1	"Steal My Sunshine"	Len	
6 August 1999	1	"Heaven Coming Down"	The Tea Party	
13 August 1999	1	"All Star"	Smash Mouth	
20 August 1999	1	"Scar Tissue"	Red Hot Chili Peppers	
27 August 1999	1	"Nookie"	Limp Bizkit	
3 September 1999	1	"Breathe"	Moist	
10 September 1999	2	"Genie In A Bottle"	Christina Aguilera	
24 September 1999	2	"Unpretty"	TLC	
8 October 1999	1	"Strange Disease"	Prozzak	
15 October 1999	1	"(You Drive Me) Crazy"	Britney Spears	
22 October 1999	1	"Heartbreaker"	Mariah Carey featuring Jay-Z	
29 October 1999	1	"Smooth"	Santana featuring Rob Thomas	
5 November 1999	2	"Mambo No. 5 (A Little Bit Of...)"	Lou Bega	
19 November 1999	1	"Hello Time Bomb"	Matthew Good Band	
26 November 1999	2	"Larger than Life"	Backstreet Boys	
10 December 1999	1	"One Man Army"	Our Lady Peace	
17 December 1999	1	"Re-Arranged"	Limp Bizkit	
24 December 1999	No Chart			
31 December 1999	No Chart			

=== 2000 ===
Date	Weeks @ No. 1	Song	Performer	Ref
7 January 2000	2	"Waiting for Tonight"	Jennifer Lopez	
21 January 2000	1	"Let's Ride"	Choclair	
28 January 2000	1	"Learn to Fly"	Foo Fighters	
4 February 2000	1	"Blue (Da Ba Dee)"	Eiffel 65	
11 February 2000	2	"What a Girl Wants"	Christina Aguilera	
25 February 2000	2	"Show Me the Meaning of Being Lonely"	Backstreet Boys	
10 March 2000	2	"Load Me Up"	Matthew Good Band	
24 March 2000	1	"Is Anybody Home?"	Our Lady Peace	
31 March 2000	2	"Bye Bye Bye"	*NSYNC	
14 April 2000	1	"Otherside"	Red Hot Chili Peppers	
21 April 2000	1	"Forgot About Dre"	Dr. Dre featuring Eminem	
28 April 2000	1	"Maria Maria"	Santana featuring The Product G&B	
5 May 2000	1	"I Try"	Macy Gray	
12 May 2000	2	"Thong Song"	Sisqó	
26 May 2000	3	"Oops!... I Did It Again"	Britney Spears	
16 June 2000	1	"Alive"	Edwin	
23 June 2000	1	"He Wasn't Man Enough"	Toni Braxton	
30 June 2000	1	"American Bad Ass"	Kid Rock	
7 July 2000	2	"The Real Slim Shady"	Eminem	
21 July 2000	1	"Sour Girl"	Stone Temple Pilots	
28 July 2000	1	"Top of the World"	Rascalz featuring Barrington Levy & k-os	
4 August 2000	2	"It's Gonna Be Me"	*NSYNC	
18 August 2000	1	"My Music at Work"	The Tragically Hip	
25 August 2000	2	"Strange Days"	Matthew Good Band	
8 September 2000	2	"Californication"	Red Hot Chili Peppers	
22 September 2000	1	"Lucky"	Britney Spears	
29 September 2000	1	"Doesn't Really Matter"	Janet	
6 October 2000	1	"Country Grammar (Hot Shit)"	Nelly	
13 October 2000	2	"Bang Bang Boom"	The Moffatts	
27 October 2000	2	"The Way I Am"	Eminem	
10 November 2000	2	"Holler"	Spice Girls	
24 November 2000	1	"Everybody Wants to Be Like You"	Snow	
1 December 2000	1	"Beautiful Day"	U2	
8 December 2000	2	"Shape of My Heart"	Backstreet Boys	
22 December 2000	1 of 2	"Independent Women Part I"	Destiny's Child	
29 December 2000	No Chart			

=== 2001 ===
Date	Weeks @ No. 1	Song	Performer	Ref
5 January 2001	2 of 2	"Independent Women Part I"	Destiny's Child	
12 January 2001	1	"Original Prankster"	The Offspring	
19 January 2001	2	"Stronger"	Britney Spears	
2 February 2001	2	"Stan"	Eminem featuring Dido	
16 February 2001	1	"I'm Like a Bird"	Nelly Furtado	
23 February 2001	2	"It Wasn't Me"	Shaggy featuring Rikrok	
9 March 2001	2	"Love Don't Cost a Thing"	Jennifer Lopez	
23 March 2001	1	"The Plumb Song"	Snow	
30 March 2001	1	"Stutter"	Joe featuring Mystikal	
6 April 2001	2	"Butterfly"	Crazy Town	
20 April 2001	2	"Angel"	Shaggy featuring Rayvon	
4 May 2001	1	"Hanging by a Moment"	Lifehouse	
11 May 2001	2	"All for You"	Janet	
25 May 2001	3	"Survivor"	Destiny's Child	
15 June 2001	2	"Lady Marmalade"	Christina Aguilera, Lil' Kim, Mýa & Pink	
29 June 2001	1	"Days Like That"	Sugar Jones	
6 July 2001	2	"It's Been Awhile"	Staind	
20 July 2001	2	"Fat Lip"	Sum 41	
3 August 2001	1	"Life"	Our Lady Peace	
10 August 2001	1	"California"	Wave	
17 August 2001	1	"The Rock Show"	Blink-182	
24 August 2001	2	"Purple Hills"	D12	
7 September 2001	1	"Bootylicious"	Destiny's Child	
14 September 2001	2	"Someone to Call My Lover"	Janet	
28 September 2001	1	"U Remind Me"	Usher	
5 October 2001	1	"Hit 'Em Up Style (Oops!)"	Blu Cantrell	
12 October 2001	2	"Fallin'"	Alicia Keys	
26 October 2001	3	"How You Remind Me"	Nickelback	
16 November 2001	1	"Wasting My Time"	Default	
23 November 2001	1	"Fade"	Staind	
30 November 2001	1	"In Too Deep"	Sum 41	
7 December 2001	1	"Family Affair"	Mary J. Blige	
14 December 2001	1	"Wish You Were Here"	Incubus	
21 December 2001	1	"Hero"	Enrique Iglesias	
28 December 2001	No Chart			

=== 2002 ===
Date	Weeks @ No. 1	Song	Performer
4 January 2002	No Chart		
11 January 2002	2	"Get the Party Started"	Pink
25 January 2002	1	"Black Black Heart"	David Usher
1 February 2002	1	"My Sacrifice"	Creed
8 February 2002	1	"U Got It Bad"	Usher
15 February 2002	1	"Fuel Injected"	Swollen Members featuring Moka Only
22 February 2002	2	"Can't Get You Out of My Head"	Kylie Minogue
8 March 2002	1	"Whenever, Wherever"	Shakira
15 March 2002	2	"Too Bad"	Nickelback
29 March 2002	1	"Hands Clean"	Alanis Morissette
5 April 2002	1	"Deny"	Default
12 April 2002	1	"Always on Time"	Ja Rule featuring Ashanti
19 April 2002	1	"Escape"	Enrique Iglesias
26 April 2002	2	"Don't Let Me Get Me"	Pink
10 May 2002	1	"Take a Message"	Remy Shand
17 May 2002	1	"U Don't Have to Call"	Usher
24 May 2002	2	"Underneath Your Clothes"	Shakira
7 June 2002	1	"Bring It Home"	Swollen Members featuring Moka Only
14 June 2002	2	"Complicated"	Avril Lavigne
28 June 2002	1	"Foolish"	Ashanti
5 July 2002	1	"It's What We're All About"	Sum 41
12 July 2002	1	"Hero"	Chad Kroeger featuring Josey Scott
19 July 2002	2	"Without Me"	Eminem
2 August 2002	2	"Somewhere Out There"	Our Lady Peace
16 August 2002	2	"Hot in Herre"	Nelly
30 August 2002	1	"Just Like A Pill"	Pink
6 September 2002	1	"By the Way"	Red Hot Chili Peppers
13 September 2002	1	"Crazy World"	Rascalz featuring Notch & Sazon Diamante
20 September 2002	2	"In My Place"	Coldplay
4 October 2002	1	"Hundred Million"	Treble Charger
11 October 2002	2	"Cleanin' Out My Closet"	Eminem
25 October 2002	2	"Sk8er Boi"	Avril Lavigne
8 November 2002	2	"Dilemma"	Nelly featuring Kelly Rowland
22 November 2002	1	"Get Ready"	Shawn Desman
29 November 2002	1	"Steppin' Thru"	Swollen Members
6 December 2002	2	"Lose Yourself"	Eminem
20 December 2002	1	"Innocent"	Our Lady Peace
27 December 2002	No Chart		

=== 2003 ===
Date	Weeks @ No. 1	Song	Performer
3 January 2003	No Chart		
10 January 2003	2	"Work It"	Missy Elliott
24 January 2003	1	"Family Portrait"	Pink
31 January 2003	2	"Still Waiting"	Sum 41
14 February 2003	2	"I'm With You"	Avril Lavigne
28 February 2003	1	"Cry Me a River"	Justin Timberlake
7 March 2003	2	"Beautiful"	Christina Aguilera
21 March 2003	1	"Don't Walk Away Eileen"	Sam Roberts
28 March 2003	1	"Gossip Folks"	Missy Elliott featuring Ludacris
4 April 2003	2	"In da Club"	50 Cent
18 April 2003	1	"Shook"	Shawn Desman
25 April 2003	1	"Breath"	Swollen Members featuring Nelly Furtado
2 May 2003	1	"Make Up Your Mind"	Theory of a Deadman
9 May 2003	1	"Clocks"	Coldplay
16 May 2003	2	"Rock Your Body"	Justin Timberlake
30 May 2003	1	"Somewhere I Belong"	Linkin Park
6 June 2003	1	"Sing for the Moment"	Eminem
13 June 2003	1	"Addicted"	Simple Plan
20 June 2003	2	"Get Busy"	Sean Paul
4 July 2003	2	"Losing Grip"	Avril Lavigne
18 July 2003	1	"Seven Nation Army"	The White Stripes
25 July 2003	2	"Bring Me to Life"	Evanescence
8 August 2003	1	"21 Questions"	50 Cent featuring Nate Dogg
15 August 2003	2	"Crazy in Love"	Beyoncé featuring Jay-Z
29 August 2003	1	"Where Have All the Good People Gone?"	Sam Roberts
5 September 2003	1	"I Hate Everything About You"	Three Days Grace
12 September 2003	1	"Faint"	Linkin Park
19 September 2003	2	"Where Is the Love?"	The Black Eyed Peas
3 October 2003	1	"Going Under"	Evanescence
10 October 2003	1	"Girls & Boys"	Good Charlotte
17 October 2003	1	"The Boys of Summer"	The Ataris
24 October 2003	2	"Someday"	Nickelback
7 November 2003	2	"Baby Boy"	Beyoncé featuring Sean Paul
21 November 2003	1	"One Thing"	Finger Eleven
28 November 2003	1	"Try Honesty"	Billy Talent
5 December 2003	1	"Stand Up"	Ludacris featuring Shawnna
12 December 2003	1	"The Hardest Button to Button"	The White Stripes
19 December 2003	1	"Here Without You"	3 Doors Down
26 December 2003	No Chart		

=== 2004 ===
Date	Weeks @ No. 1	Song	Performer
2 January 2004	No Chart		
9 January 2004	1	"Shut Up"	The Black Eyed Peas
16 January 2004	1	"Numb"	Linkin Park
23 January 2004	1	"The Way You Move"	Outkast featuring Sleepy Brown
30 January 2004	4	"Hey Ya!"	Outkast
27 February 2004	1	"Just Like You"	Three Days Grace
5 March 2004	1	"Are You Gonna Be My Girl"	Jet
12 March 2004	2	"My Immortal"	Evanescence
26 March 2004	2	"Toxic"	Britney Spears
9 April 2004	1	"Figured You Out"	Nickelback
16 April 2004	1	"Everything"	Fefe Dobson
23 April 2004	1	"Yeah!"	Usher featuring Lil Jon & Ludacris
30 April 2004	1	"I Miss You"	Blink-182
7 May 2004	1	"The Ex"	Billy Talent
14 May 2004	1	"I Believe in a Thing Called Love"	The Darkness
21 May 2004	1	"This Love"	Maroon 5
28 May 2004	1	"Don't Tell Me"	Avril Lavigne
4 June 2004	1	"My Band"	D12
11 June 2004	1	"Cold Hard Bitch"	Jet
18 June 2004	2	"The Reason"	Hoobastank
2 July 2004	2	"Ch-Check It Out"	Beastie Boys
16 July 2004	1	"Everybody's Fool"	Evanescence
23 July 2004	1	"Burn"	Usher
30 July 2004	1	"Bad Boy"	Keshia Chanté
6 August 2004	2	"River Below"	Billy Talent
20 August 2004	1	"Breaking the Habit"	Linkin Park
27 August 2004	1	"My Happy Ending"	Avril Lavigne
3 September 2004	1	"Let's Get It Started"	The Black Eyed Peas
10 September 2004	1	"Leave (Get Out)"	JoJo
17 September 2004	2	"Somebody Told Me"	The Killers
1 October 2004	1	"She Will Be Loved"	Maroon 5
8 October 2004	1	"Does He Love Me?"	Keshia Chanté
15 October 2004	2	"Crabbuckit"	k-os
29 October 2004	1	"American Idiot"	Green Day
5 November 2004	1	"Fall To Pieces"	Velvet Revolver
12 November 2004	1	"Predictable"	Good Charlotte
19 November 2004	1	"We're All to Blame"	Sum 41
26 November 2004	1	"Just Lose It"	Eminem
3 December 2004	1	"Welcome to My Life"	Simple Plan
10 December 2004	1	"My Boo"	Usher & Alicia Keys
17 December 2004	1 of 2	"Nobody's Home"	Avril Lavigne
24 December 2004	No Chart		
31 December 2004	No Chart		

=== 2005 ===
Date	Weeks @ No. 1	Song	Performer
7 January 2005	2 of 2	"Nobody's Home"	Avril Lavigne
14 January 2005	1	"Tell All Your Friends"	Projet Orange
21 January 2005	1	"Home"	Three Days Grace
28 January 2005	1	"Vertigo"	U2
4 February 2005	2	"Boulevard of Broken Dreams"	Green Day
18 February 2005	1	"1, 2 Step"	Ciara featuring Missy Elliott
25 February 2005	2	"Mr. Brightside"	The Killers
11 March 2005	1	"Nothing to Lose"	Billy Talent
18 March 2005	1	"Since U Been Gone"	Kelly Clarkson
25 March 2005	1	"Man I Used to Be"	k-os
1 April 2005	1	"Pieces"	Sum 41
8 April 2005	1	"Caught Up"	Usher
15 April 2005	1	"Shut Up"	Simple Plan
22 April 2005	2	"Candy Shop"	50 Cent featuring Olivia
6 May 2005	2	"Holiday"	Green Day
20 May 2005	1	"He Wasn't"	Avril Lavigne
27 May 2005	2	"Oh"	Ciara featuring Ludacris
10 June 2005	1	"Hate It or Love It"	The Game featuring 50 Cent
17 June 2005	2	"Don't Phunk with My Heart"	The Black Eyed Peas
1 July 2005	2	"Hollaback Girl"	Gwen Stefani
15 July 2005	1	"Just a Lil Bit"	50 Cent
22 July 2005	1	"Incomplete"	Backstreet Boys
29 July 2005	1	"All These Things That I've Done"	The Killers
5 August 2005	2	"We Belong Together"	Mariah Carey
19 August 2005	1	"Untitled (How Could This Happen to Me?)"	Simple Plan
26 August 2005	1	"Speed of Sound"	Coldplay
2 September 2005	1	"Be Easy"	Massari
9 September 2005	1	"Santa Monica"	Theory of a Deadman
16 September 2005	1	"Don't Cha"	Pussycat Dolls featuring Busta Rhymes
23 September 2005	1	"Pon de Replay"	Rihanna
30 September 2005	1	"Wake Me Up When September Ends"	Green Day
7 October 2005	1	"Cool"	Gwen Stefani
14 October 2005	2	"Photograph"	Nickelback
28 October 2005	1	"Shake It Off"	Mariah Carey
4 November 2005	1	"Where Are You"	Our Lady Peace
11 November 2005	1	"Gold Digger"	Kanye West featuring Jamie Foxx
18 November 2005	1	"When the Night Feels My Song"	Bedouin Soundclash
25 November 2005	1	"My Humps"	The Black Eyed Peas
2 December 2005	1	"On My Own"	Hedley
9 December 2005	1	"Because of You"	Kelly Clarkson
16 December 2005	1	"Crazy"	Simple Plan
23 December 2005	No Chart		
30 December 2005	No Chart		

=== 2006 ===
Date	Weeks @ No. 1	Song	Performer
6 January 2006	1	"Do You Want To"	Franz Ferdinand
13 January 2006	1	"Jesus of Suburbia"	Green Day
20 January 2006	1	"Run It!"	Chris Brown featuring Juelz Santana
27 January 2006	1	"If It's Lovin' that You Want"	Rihanna
3 February 2006	1	"Real Love"	Massari
10 February 2006	1	"Don't Forget About Us"	Mariah Carey
17 February 2006	1	"Hung Up"	Madonna
24 February 2006	1	"Stickwitu"	Pussycat Dolls
3 March 2006	1	"Trip"	Hedley
10 March 2006	2	"Dance, Dance"	Fall Out Boy
24 March 2006	1	"Temperature"	Sean Paul
31 March 2006	1	"So Sick"	Ne-Yo
7 April 2006	1	"Pump It"	The Black Eyed Peas
14 April 2006	1	"The Grace"	Neverending White Lights
21 April 2006	1	"Stupid Girls"	Pink
28 April 2006	1	"Save Your Scissors"	City and Colour
5 May 2006	1	"Savin' Me"	Nickelback
12 May 2006	1	"A Little Less Sixteen Candles, A Little More "Touch Me""	Fall Out Boy
19 May 2006	1	"SOS"	Rihanna
26 May 2006	1	"Out of My Head"	Mobile
2 June 2006	1	"I Write Sins Not Tragedies"	Panic! at the Disco
9 June 2006	1	"3 2 1"	Hedley
16 June 2006	1	"Dani California"	Red Hot Chili Peppers
23 June 2006	1	"Hips Don't Lie"	Shakira featuring Wyclef Jean
30 June 2006	2	"Devil in a Midnight Mass"	Billy Talent
14 July 2006	1	"Out of My Head"	Mobile
21 July 2006	1	"Animal I Have Become"	Three Days Grace
28 July 2006	1	"Promiscuous"	Nelly Furtado featuring Timbaland
4 August 2006	1	"Unfaithful"	Rihanna
11 August 2006	1	"Buttons"	Pussycat Dolls featuring Snoop Dogg
18 August 2006	2	"Ain't No Other Man"	Christina Aguilera
1 September 2006	1	"Hate Me"	Blue October
8 September 2006	1	"Miss Murder"	AFI
15 September 2006	1	"Far Away"	Nickelback
22 September 2006	1	"SexyBack"	Justin Timberlake featuring Timbaland
29 September 2006	1	"London Bridge"	Fergie
6 October 2006	1	"Call Me When You're Sober"	Evanescence
13 October 2006	1	"This Could Be Anywhere in the World"	Alexisonfire
20 October 2006	1	"Red Flag"	Billy Talent
27 October 2006	1	"Talk to Me"	George
3 November 2006	2	"When You Were Young"	The Killers
17 November 2006	1	"Comin' Home"	City and Colour
24 November 2006	1	"Lips of an Angel"	Hinder
1 December 2006	1	"Gunnin'"	Hedley
8 December 2006	1	"Maneater"	Nelly Furtado
15 December 2006	1	"Welcome to the Black Parade"	My Chemical Romance
22 December 2006	No Chart		
29 December 2006	No Chart		

=== 2007 ===
Date	Weeks @ No. 1	Song	Performer
5 January 2007	1	"My Love"	Justin Timberlake featuring T.I.
12 January 2007	1	"Pain"	Three Days Grace
19 January 2007	1	"Smack That"	Akon featuring Eminem
26 January 2007	1	"Fergalicious"	Fergie
2 February 2007	1	"Wind It Up"	Gwen Stefani
9 February 2007	1	"Irreplaceable"	Beyoncé
16 February 2007	1	"Say It Right"	Nelly Furtado
23 February 2007	1	"Fallen Leaves"	Billy Talent
2 March 2007	2	"I Wanna Love You"	Akon featuring Snoop Dogg
16 March 2007	1	"Famous Last Words"	My Chemical Romance
23 March 2007	2	"The Sweet Escape"	Gwen Stefani featuring Akon
6 April 2007	1	"Pressure"	Belly featuring Ginuwine
13 April 2007	1	"If Everyone Cared"	Nickelback
20 April 2007	1	"Wait a Minute"	Pussycat Dolls featuring Timbaland
27 April 2007	1	"What Goes Around... Comes Around"	Justin Timberlake
4 May 2007	1	"Paralyzer"	Finger Eleven
11 May 2007	1	"Glamorous"	Fergie featuring Ludacris
18 May 2007	2	"Girlfriend"	Avril Lavigne
1 June 2007	1	"It's Not Over"	Daughtry
8 June 2007	1	"With Love"	Hilary Duff
15 June 2007	2	"Surrender"	Billy Talent
29 June 2007	1	"Never Too Late"	Three Days Grace
6 July 2007	1	"What I've Done"	Linkin Park
13 July 2007	2	"Umbrella"	Rihanna featuring Jay-Z
27 July 2007	1	"Makes Me Wonder"	Maroon 5
3 August 2007	1	"Big Girls Don't Cry"	Fergie
10 August 2007	1	"Shake Tramp"	Marianas Trench
17 August 2007	1	"Stranger"	Hilary Duff
24 August 2007	1	"When You're Gone"	Avril Lavigne
31 August 2007	1	"Shut Up and Drive"	Rihanna
7 September 2007	1	"LoveStoned/I Think She Knows"	Justin Timberlake
14 September 2007	1	"The Way I Are"	Timbaland featuring Keri Hilson, D.O.E. & Sebastian
21 September 2007	1	"Beautiful Girls"	Sean Kingston
28 September 2007	1	"Hey There Delilah"	Plain White T's
5 October 2007	1	"Stronger"	Kanye West featuring Daft Punk
12 October 2007	1	"Do It"	Nelly Furtado
19 October 2007	1	"Falling On"	Finger Eleven
26 October 2007	1	"Bleed It Out"	Linkin Park
2 November 2007	1	"Wake Up Call"	Maroon 5
9 November 2007	1	"Nothing Special"	illScarlett
16 November 2007	1	"The Pretender"	Foo Fighters
23 November 2007	1	"Good Life"	Kanye West featuring T-Pain
30 November 2007	1	"Tongue Tied"	Faber Drive
7 December 2007	1	"Crank That (Soulja Boy)"	Soulja Boy Tell 'Em
14 December 2007	1	"She's So Sorry"	Hedley
21 December 2007	No chart		
28 December 2007	No chart		

=== 2008 ===
Date	Weeks @ No. 1	Song	Performer
5 January 2008	No chart		
12 January 2008	1	"Don't Stop the Music"	Rihanna
19 January 2008	1	"Apologize"	Timbaland featuring OneRepublic
26 January 2008	1	"Hot"	Avril Lavigne
2 February 2008	1	"Clumsy"	Fergie
9 February 2008	1	"No One"	Alicia Keys
16 February 2008	1	"Kiss Kiss"	Chris Brown featuring T-Pain
23 February 2008	1	"Low"	Flo Rida featuring T-Pain
1 March 2008	1	"Ridin"	Belly featuring Mario Winans
8 March 2008	1	"I'll Keep Your Memory Vague"	Finger Eleven
15 March 2008	1	"For the Nights I Can't Remember"	Hedley
22 March 2008	1	"When I'm Gone"	Simple Plan
29 March 2008	1	"Piece of Me"	Britney Spears
3 April 2008	1	"Hold Me in Your Arms"	The Trews
10 April 2008	1	"Waiting..."	City and Colour
17 April 2008	1	"With You"	Chris Brown
24 April 2008	2	"Start All Over"	Miley Cyrus
10 May 2008	1	"When You Look Me in the Eyes"	Jonas Brothers
17 May 2008	1	"Touch My Body"	Mariah Carey
24 May 2008	1	"No Air"	Jordin Sparks featuring Chris Brown
31 May 2008	1	"Elevator"	Flo Rida featuring Timbaland
7 June 2008	1	"4 Minutes"	Madonna featuring Justin Timberlake & Timbaland
14 June 2008	1	"Never Too Late"	Hedley
21 June 2008	1	"Take a Bow"	Rihanna
28 June 2008	1	"Love in This Club"	Usher featuring Young Jeezy
5 July 2008	1	"Bleeding Love"	Leona Lewis
12 July 2008	1	"Dangerous"	Kardinal Offishall featuring Akon
19 July 2008	1	"Lollipop"	Lil Wayne featuring Static Major
26 July 2008	1	"Your Love Is a Lie"	Simple Plan
2 August 2008	1	"Like Me"	Girlicious
9 August 2008	1	"Violet Hill"	Coldplay
16 August 2008	1	"Shake It"	Metro Station
23 August 2008	1	"I Kissed a Girl"	Katy Perry
30 August 2008	1	"When I Grow Up"	Pussycat Dolls
6 September 2008	1	"Burnin' Up"	Jonas Brothers featuring Big Rob
13 September 2008	1	"7 Things"	Miley Cyrus
20 September 2008	1	"In the Ayer"	Flo Rida featuring will.i.am
27 September 2008	1	"Just Dance"	Lady Gaga featuring Colby O'Donis
4 October 2008	1	"Disturbia"	Rihanna
11 October 2008	1	"Stupid Shit"	Girlicious
18 October 2008	1	"Viva la Vida"	Coldplay
25 October 2008	1	"So What"	Pink
1 November 2008	1	"Private Dancer"	Danny Fernandes featuring Belly
8 November 2008	1	"Whatever You Like"	T.I.
15 November 2008	1	"Let It Rock"	Kevin Rudolf featuring Lil Wayne
22 November 2008	1	"Never Again"	The Midway State
29 November 2008	1	"I Don't Care"	Fall Out Boy
6 December 2008	1	"Womanizer"	Britney Spears
13 December 2008	1	"Hot n Cold"	Katy Perry
20 December 2008	1	"If I Were a Boy"	Beyoncé
27 December 2008	No chart		

=== 2009 ===
Date	Weeks @ No. 1	Song	Performer
3 January 2009	No chart		
10 January 2009	1	"Drive My Soul"	Lights
17 January 2009	1	"Lovebug"	Jonas Brothers
24 January 2009	1	"Sex on Fire"	Kings of Leon
31 January 2009	1	"Live Your Life"	T.I. featuring Rihanna
7 February 2009	1	"Poker Face"	Lady Gaga
14 February 2009	1	"Single Ladies (Put a Ring on It)"	Beyoncé
21 February 2009	1	"Rehab"	Rihanna featuring Justin Timberlake
28 February 2009	1	"Circus"	Britney Spears
7 March 2009	1	"Sober"	Pink
14 March 2009	1	"I Hate This Part"	Pussycat Dolls
21 March 2009	1	"Cross My Heart"	Marianas Trench
28 March 2009	1	"Fantasy"	Danny Fernandes
4 April 2009	1	"Gotta Be Somebody"	Nickelback
11 April 2009	1	"Use Somebody"	Kings of Leon
18 April 2009	1	"Heartless"	Kanye West
25 April 2009	1	"My Life Would Suck Without You"	Kelly Clarkson
2 May 2009	1	"Dead and Gone"	T.I. featuring Justin Timberlake
9 May 2009	1	"LoveGame"	Lady Gaga
16 May 2009	1	"Tonight"	Jonas Brothers
23 May 2009	1	"Right Round"	Flo Rida featuring Kesha
30 May 2009	1	"Halo"	Beyoncé
6 June 2009	1	"The Climb"	Miley Cyrus
13 June 2009	1	"Audience of One"	Rise Against
20 June 2009	2	"Boom Boom Pow"	The Black Eyed Peas
4 July 2009	1	"If U Seek Amy"	Britney Spears
11 July 2009	1	"Africa"	Karl Wolf featuring Culture
18 July 2009	1	"We Made You"	Eminem
25 July 2009	1	"If Today Was Your Last Day"	Nickelback
1 August 2009	1	"I Do Not Hook Up"	Kelly Clarkson
8 August 2009	1	"Rusted from the Rain"	Billy Talent
15 August 2009	2	"Paranoid"	Jonas Brothers
29 August 2009	1	"Waking Up in Vegas"	Katy Perry
5 September 2009	1	"Paparazzi"	Lady Gaga
12 September 2009	1	"Summer Girl"	Stereos
19 September 2009	1	"I Gotta Feeling"	The Black Eyed Peas
26 September 2009	1	"I Know You Want Me (Calle Ocho)"	Pitbull
3 October 2009	1	"Fire Burning"	Sean Kingston
10 October 2009	1	"One Time"	Justin Bieber
17 October 2009	1	"You Belong with Me"	Taylor Swift
24 October 2009	1	"Good Girls Go Bad"	Cobra Starship featuring Leighton Meester
31 October 2009	1	"Party in the U.S.A."	Miley Cyrus
7 November 2009	1	"Sexy Chick"	David Guetta featuring Akon
14 November 2009	1	"G-Get Up and Dance"	Faber Drive
21 November 2009	1	"Evacuate the Dancefloor"	Cascada
28 November 2009	1	"Devil on My Shoulder"	Billy Talent
5 December 2009	1	"Cha-Ching"	Hedley
12 December 2009	1	"Throw Ya Hands Up"	Stereos featuring Jhevon Paris
19 December 2009	1	"One Less Lonely Girl"	Justin Bieber
26 December 2009	No chart		

=== 2010 ===
Date	Weeks @ No. 1	Song	Performer
2 January 2010	No chart		
7 January 2010	1	"Fifteen"	Taylor Swift
14 January 2010	1	"Tik Tok"	Kesha
21 January 2010	1	"Fireflies"	Owl City
28 January 2010	1	"Bad Romance"	Lady Gaga
4 February 2010	1	"Whatcha Say"	Jason Derulo
11 February 2010	1	"Empire State of Mind"	Jay-Z & Alicia Keys
18 February 2010	1	"Don't Talk to Strangers"	Hedley
25 February 2010	1	"Turn It Up"	Stereos
4 March 2010	1	"Whataya Want from Me"	Adam Lambert
11 March 2010	1	"Replay"	Iyaz
18 March 2010	1	"Hard"	Rihanna featuring Jeezy
25 March 2010	1	"Beside You"	Marianas Trench
1 April 2010	1	"Rich Girl$"	Down with Webster
8 April 2010	1	"Give Him Up"	Faber Drive
15 April 2010	1	"In My Head"	Jason Derulo
22 April 2010	1	"Baby"	Justin Bieber featuring Ludacris
29 April 2010	1	"Addicted"	Danny Fernandes
6 May 2010	1	"When I Look at You"	Miley Cyrus
13 May 2010	1	"If We Ever Meet Again"	Timbaland featuring Katy Perry
20 May 2010	1	"Wavin' Flag"	Young Artists for Haiti
27 May 2010	1	"Blah Blah Blah"	Kesha featuring 3OH!3
3 June 2010	1	"Over"	Drake
10 June 2010	1	"Can't Be Tamed"	Miley Cyrus
17 June 2010	1	"Perfect"	Hedley
24 June 2010	1	"Never Let You Go"	Justin Bieber
1 July 2010	1	"Find Your Love"	Drake
8 July 2010	1	"Your Man"	Down with Webster
15 July 2010	1	"Your Love Is My Drug"	Kesha
22 July 2010	1	"OMG"	Usher featuring will.i.am
29 July 2010	1	"California Gurls"	Katy Perry featuring Snoop Dogg
5 August 2010	1	"Alejandro"	Lady Gaga
12 August 2010	1	"Airplanes"	B.o.B featuring Hayley Williams
19 August 2010	1	"Ridin' Solo"	Jason Derulo
26 August 2010	1	"Somebody to Love"	Justin Bieber featuring Usher
2 September 2010	1	"Not Afraid"	Eminem
9 September 2010	1	"Dynamite"	Taio Cruz
16 September 2010	1	"Love the Way You Lie"	Eminem featuring Rihanna
23 September 2010	1	"Teenage Dream"	Katy Perry
30 September 2010	1	"Take It Off"	Kesha
7 October 2010	1	"DJ Got Us Fallin' in Love"	Usher featuring Pitbull
14 October 2010	1	"Club Can't Handle Me"	Flo Rida featuring David Guetta
21 October 2010	1	"Just the Way You Are"	Bruno Mars
28 October 2010	1	"Whoa Is Me"	Down with Webster
4 November 2010	1	"Mine"	Taylor Swift
11 November 2010	1	"Like a G6"	Far*East Movement featuring Cataracs & Dev
18 November 2010	1	"Just a Dream"	Nelly
25 November 2010	1	"Only Girl (In the World)"	Rihanna
2 December 2010	1	"Firework"	Katy Perry
9 December 2010	1	"What's My Name?"	Rihanna featuring Drake
16 December 2010	1	"Raise Your Glass"	Pink
23 December 2010	No chart		
30 December 2010	No chart		

=== 2011 ===
Date	Weeks @ No. 1	Song	Performer
6 January 2011	1	"Grenade"	Bruno Mars
13 January 2011	1	"The Time (Dirty Bit)"	Black Eyed Peas
20 January 2011	1	"Electric / Night Like This"	Shawn Desman
27 January 2011	1	"This Time"	JDiggz featuring Neverending White Lights
3 February 2011	2	"We R Who We R"	Kesha
17 February 2011	1	"Coming Home"	Diddy-Dirty Money featuring Skylar Grey
24 February 2011	1	"Higher"	Taio Cruz featuring Travie McCoy
3 March 2011	1	"Bigger than Us"	White Lies
10 March 2011	1	"What the Hell"	Avril Lavigne
17 March 2011	1	"F**kin' Perfect"	Pink
24 March 2011	1	"Tonight (I'm Lovin' You)"	Enrique Iglesias featuring Ludacris & DJ Frank E
31 March 2011	1	"Like Magic"	JRDN
7 April 2011	1	"Born This Way"	Lady Gaga
14 April 2011	1	"Hold It Against Me"	Britney Spears
21 April 2011	1	"Who's That Chick?"	David Guetta featuring Rihanna
28 April 2011	1	"On the Floor"	Jennifer Lopez featuring Pitbull
5 May 2011	1	"Price Tag"	Jessie J featuring B.o.B
12 May 2011	1	"Alone Again"	Alyssa Reid featuring P. Reign
19 May 2011	1	"E.T."	Katy Perry featuring Kanye West
26 May 2011	1	"Till the World Ends"	Britney Spears
2 June 2011	1	"Take Me Away"	Danny Fernandes
9 June 2011	1	"Just Can't Get Enough"	Black Eyed Peas
16 June 2011	1	"Who Says"	Selena Gomez & the Scene
23 June 2011	1	"Party Rock Anthem"	LMFAO featuring Lauren Bennett & GoonRock
30 June 2011	1	"Can't Breathe"	Fefe Dobson
7 July 2011	1	"Judas"	Lady Gaga
14 July 2011	1	"Give Me Everything"	Pitbull featuring Ne-Yo, Afrojack & Nayer
21 July 2011	1	"The Lazy Song"	Bruno Mars
28 July 2011	1	"Run The World (Girls)"	Beyoncé
4 August 2011	1	"Smile"	Avril Lavigne
11 August 2011	1	"She's Dope"	Down with Webster
18 August 2011	1	"Last Friday Night (T.G.I.F.)"	Katy Perry
25 August 2011	1	"Super Bass"	Nicki Minaj
1 September 2011	1	"Edge Of Glory"	Lady Gaga
8 September 2011	1	"Love You Like a Love Song"	Selena Gomez & the Scene
15 September 2011	1	"I Wanna Go"	Britney Spears
22 September 2011	1	"Where Them Girls At"	David Guetta featuring Flo Rida & Nicki Minaj
29 September 2011	1	"Moves Like Jagger"	Maroon 5 featuring Christina Aguilera
6 October 2011	1	"You Make Me Feel..."	Cobra Starship featuring Sabi
13 October 2011	1	"Otis"	Jay-Z & Kanye West featuring Otis Redding
20 October 2011	1	"Lighters"	Bad Meets Evil featuring Bruno Mars
27 October 2011	1	"Brand New Chick"	Anjulie
3 November 2011	1	"Cheers (Drink To That)"	Rihanna
10 November 2011	1	"Yoü and I"	Lady Gaga
17 November 2011	1	"Invincible"	Hedley featuring P. Reign
24 November 2011	1	"Sexy and I Know It"	LMFAO
1 December 2011	1	"Headlines"	Drake
8 December 2011	1	"Haven't Had Enough"	Marianas Trench
15 December 2011	1	"Countdown"	Beyoncé
22 December 2011	1	"Without You"	David Guetta featuring Usher
29 December 2011	No Chart		

=== 2012 ===
Date	Weeks @ No. 1	Song	Performer
5 January 2012	1	"We Found Love"	Rihanna featuring Calvin Harris
12 January 2012	1	"Good Feeling"	Flo Rida
19 January 2012	1	"Shut Up and Dance"	Victoria Duffield
26 January 2012	1	"The One That Got Away"	Katy Perry
2 February 2012	1	"Hit the Lights"	Selena Gomez & the Scene
9 February 2012	1	"Marry the Night"	Lady Gaga
16 February 2012	1	"Hit Me Up"	Danny Fernandes featuring Josh Ramsay & Belly
23 February 2012	3	"What Makes You Beautiful"	One Direction
15 March 2012	2	"Call Me Maybe"	Carly Rae Jepsen
29 March 2012	1	"One Life"	Hedley
5 April 2012	1	"Turn Me On"	David Guetta featuring Nicki Minaj
12 April 2012	1	"Fallout"	Marianas Trench
19 April 2012	1	"Glad You Came"	The Wanted
26 April 2012	1	"The Motto"	Drake featuring Lil Wayne & Tyga
3 May 2012	1	"Wild Ones"	Flo Rida featuring Sia
10 May 2012	1	"We Are Young"	Fun featuring Janelle Monáe
17 May 2012	1	"Feel So Close"	Calvin Harris
24 May 2012	1	"Part of Me"	Katy Perry
31 May 2012	1	"One Thing"	One Direction
7 June 2012	1	"Take Care"	Drake featuring Rihanna
14 June 2012	2	"Boyfriend"	Justin Bieber
28 June 2012	1	"Summer Paradise"	Simple Plan featuring Sean Paul
5 July 2012	1	"Starships"	Nicki Minaj
12 July 2012	1	"Titanium"	David Guetta featuring Sia
19 July 2012	1	"Where Have You Been"	Rihanna
26 July 2012	1	"Payphone"	Maroon 5 featuring Wiz Khalifa
2 August 2012	1	"Whistle"	Flo Rida
9 August 2012	1	"Wide Awake"	Katy Perry
16 August 2012	1	"Let's Go"	Calvin Harris featuring Ne-Yo
23 August 2012	1	"Both of Us"	B.o.B featuring Taylor Swift
30 August 2012	1	"Gotta Be You"	One Direction
6 September 2012	1	"Desperate Measures"	Marianas Trench
13 September 2012	1	"Good Time"	Owl City & Carly Rae Jepsen
20 September 2012	1	"Blow Me (One Last Kiss)"	Pink
27 September 2012	1	"Some Nights"	Fun
4 October 2012	2	"As Long as You Love Me"	Justin Bieber featuring Big Sean
18 October 2012	1	"Kiss You Inside Out"	Hedley
25 October 2012	1	"We Are Never Ever Getting Back Together"	Taylor Swift
1 November 2012	1	"Gangnam Style"	PSY
8 November 2012	1	"The Veldt"	deadmau5 featuring Chris James
15 November 2012	1	"Ready or Not"	Bridgit Mendler
22 November 2012	1	"Let Me Love You (Until You Learn to Love Yourself)"	Ne-Yo
29 November 2012	1	"Live While We're Young"	One Direction
6 December 2012	1	"I Cry"	Flo Rida
13 December 2012	1	"Try"	Pink
20 December 2012	1	"Beauty and a Beat"	Justin Bieber featuring Nicki Minaj
27 December 2012	No chart		

=== 2013 ===
Date	Weeks @ No. 1	Song	Performer
3 January 2013	No chart		
10 January 2013	1	"Begin Again"	Taylor Swift
17 January 2013	1	"Locked Out of Heaven"	Bruno Mars
24 January 2013	1	"Diamonds"	Rihanna
31 January 2013	1	"Wicked Games"	The Weeknd
7 February 2013	1	"This Kiss"	Carly Rae Jepsen
14 February 2013	1	"Don't You Worry Child"	Swedish House Mafia featuring John Martin
21 February 2013	2	"Thrift Shop"	Macklemore and Ryan Lewis featuring Wanz
7 March 2013	1	"Little Things"	One Direction
14 March 2013	1	"Scream & Shout"	will.i.am featuring Britney Spears
21 March 2013	1	"Closer"	Tegan and Sara
28 March 2013	1	"I Knew You Were Trouble"	Taylor Swift
4 April 2013	1	"Inner Ninja"	Classified featuring David Myles
11 April 2013	1	"Kiss You"	One Direction
18 April 2013	1	"Started from the Bottom"	Drake
25 April 2013	1	"Stay"	Rihanna featuring Mikky Ekko
2 May 2013	1	"Stompa"	Serena Ryder
9 May 2013	1	"Suit & Tie"	Justin Timberlake featuring Jay-Z
16 May 2013	1	"Just Give Me a Reason"	Pink featuring Nate Ruess
23 May 2013	1	"22"	Taylor Swift
30 May 2013	1	"Feel This Moment"	Pitbull featuring Christina Aguilera
6 June 2013	1	"NYCE 2 Know Ya"	k-os
13 June 2013	1	"Gentleman"	PSY
20 June 2013	1	"Radioactive"	Imagine Dragons
27 June 2013	1	"Mirrors"	Justin Timberlake
4 July 2013	1	"Can't Hold Us"	Macklemore and Ryan Lewis featuring Ray Dalton
11 July 2013	3	"Blurred Lines"	Robin Thicke featuring T.I. & Pharrell
1 August 2013	2	"We Can't Stop"	Miley Cyrus
15 August 2013	1	"Treasure"	Bruno Mars
22 August 2013	1	"What I Wouldn't Do"	Serena Ryder
29 August 2013	1	"Same Love"	Macklemore and Ryan Lewis featuring Mary Lambert
5 September 2013	1	"Wake Me Up!"	Avicii
12 September 2013	1	"Black Skinhead"	Kanye West
19 September 2013	1	"Best Song Ever"	One Direction
26 September 2013	2	"Royals"	Lorde
10 October 2013	1	"Belong to the World"	The Weeknd
17 October 2013	1	"Applause"	Lady Gaga
24 October 2013	2	"Roar"	Katy Perry
7 November 2013	1	"Wrecking Ball"	Miley Cyrus
14 November 2013	1	"Anything"	Hedley
21 November 2013	1	"Hold On, We're Going Home"	Drake featuring Majid Jordan
28 November 2013	1	"Reflektor"	Arcade Fire
5 December 2013	1	"Berzerk"	Eminem
12 December 2013	1	"Live For"	The Weeknd featuring Drake
19 December 2013	No chart		
26 December 2013	No chart		

=== 2014 ===
Date	Weeks @ No. 1	Song	Performer
3 January 2014	No chart		
10 January 2014	1	"TKO"	Justin Timberlake
17 January 2014	1	"White Walls"	Macklemore and Ryan Lewis featuring Schoolboy Q & Hollis
24 January 2014	1	"Story of My Life"	One Direction
31 January 2014	1	"Timber"	Pitbull featuring Kesha
7 February 2014	1	"Unconditionally"	Katy Perry
14 February 2014	1	"The Monster"	Eminem featuring Rihanna
21 February 2014	1	"Drunk in Love"	Beyoncé featuring Jay-Z
28 February 2014	1	"All That Matters"	Justin Bieber
7 March 2014	1	"Worst Behavior"	Drake
14 March 2014	1	"Team"	Lorde
21 March 2014	1	"Adore You"	Miley Cyrus
28 March 2014	1	"Hey Brother"	Avicii
4 April 2014	1	"Happy"	Pharrell Williams
11 April 2014	1	"Dark Horse"	Katy Perry featuring Juicy J
18 April 2014	1	"Afterlife"	Arcade Fire
25 April 2014	1	"Talk Dirty"	Jason Derulo featuring 2 Chainz
2 May 2014	1	"Crazy For You"	Hedley
9 May 2014	1	"She Looks So Perfect"	5 Seconds of Summer
16 May 2014	1	"Midnight Memories"	One Direction
23 May 2014	1	"Partition"	Beyoncé
30 May 2014	1	"Turn Down for What"	DJ Snake and Lil Jon
6 June 2014	1	"Summer"	Calvin Harris
13 June 2014	1	"Fancy"	Iggy Azalea featuring Charli XCX
20 June 2014	1	"You & I"	One Direction
27 June 2014	1	"Birthday"	Katy Perry
4 July 2014	1	"Stay with Me"	Sam Smith
11 July 2014	1	"Latch"	Disclosure featuring Sam Smith
18 July 2014	1	"Sing"	Ed Sheeran
25 July 2014	1	"Hideaway"	Kiesza
1 August 2014	1	"Jealous (I Ain't with It)"	Chromeo
8 August 2014	1	"Problem"	Ariana Grande featuring Iggy Azalea
15 August 2014	1	"We Dem Boyz"	Wiz Khalifa
22 August 2014	1	"Am I Wrong"	Nico & Vinz
29 August 2014	3	"Chandelier"	Sia
19 September 2014	1	"All About That Bass"	Meghan Trainor
26 September 2014	1	"Maps"	Maroon 5
3 October 2014	1	"This Is How We Do"	Katy Perry
10 October 2014	1	"We Exist"	Arcade Fire
17 October 2014	1	"I'm Not the Only One"	Sam Smith
24 October 2014	2	"Life of the Party"	Shawn Mendes
7 November 2014	1	"Amnesia"	5 Seconds of Summer
14 November 2014	1	"Don't"	Ed Sheeran
21 November 2014	1	"Shake It Off"	Taylor Swift
28 November 2014	1	"Bang Bang"	Jessie J, Ariana Grande and Nicki Minaj
5 December 2014	1	"Habits (Stay High)"	Tove Lo
12 December 2014	1	"Blame"	Calvin Harris featuring John Newman
19 December 2014	1	"Take Me to Church"	Hozier
26 December 2014	No chart		

=== 2015 ===
Date	Weeks @ No. 1	Song	Performer
2 January 2015	No chart		
9 January 2015	1	"Animals"	Maroon 5
16 January 2015	1	"Waves (Robin Schulz Remix)"	Mr. Probz
23 January 2015	1	"Love Me Harder"	Ariana Grande and The Weeknd
30 January 2015	1	"Blank Space"	Taylor Swift
6 February 2015	1	"Thinking Out Loud"	Ed Sheeran
13 February 2015	1	"Jealous"	Nick Jonas
20 February 2015	1	"Often"	The Weeknd
27 February 2015	1	"Steal My Girl"	One Direction
6 March 2015	1	"Tuesday"	ILoveMakonnen featuring Drake
13 March 2015	1	"Uptown Funk"	Mark Ronson featuring Bruno Mars
20 March 2015	1	"Something Big"	Shawn Mendes
27 March 2015	1	"Lips Are Movin"	Meghan Trainor
3 April 2015	1	"Prayer in C"	Lilly Wood & the Prick and Robin Schulz
10 April 2015	1	"Elastic Heart"	Sia
17 April 2015	1	"Only"	Nicki Minaj featuring Drake, Lil Wayne and Chris Brown
24 April 2015	1	"FourFiveSeconds"	Rihanna, Kanye West and Paul McCartney
1 May 2015	1	"Outside"	Calvin Harris featuring Ellie Goulding
8 May 2015	1	"Style"	Taylor Swift
15 May 2015	1	"Life of the Party"	Shawn Mendes
22 May 2015	1	"Love Me Like You Do"	Ellie Goulding
29 May 2015	1	"I'm an Albatraoz"	AronChupa
5 June 2015	1	"One Last Time"	Ariana Grande
12 June 2015	1	"A Little Too Much"	Shawn Mendes
19 June 2015	1	"Want to Want Me"	Jason Derulo
26 June 2015	1	"I Really Like You"	Carly Rae Jepsen
3 July 2015	1	"See You Again"	Wiz Khalifa featuring Charlie Puth
10 July 2015	1	"Her"	Majid Jordan
17 July 2015	1	"Lean On"	Major Lazer and DJ Snake featuring MØ
24 July 2015	1	"Photograph"	Ed Sheeran
31 July 2015	1	"Stitches"	Shawn Mendes
7 August 2015	1	"Shut Up and Dance"	Walk the Moon
14 August 2015	1	"Bad Blood"	Taylor Swift featuring Kendrick Lamar
21 August 2015	1	"Cheerleader"	OMI
28 August 2015	1	"The Hills"	The Weeknd
4 September 2015	2	"Can't Feel My Face"	The Weeknd
18 September 2015	1	"Where Are Ü Now"	Jack Ü featuring Justin Bieber
25 September 2015	1	"Here"	Alessia Cara
2 October 2015	1	"Good for You"	Selena Gomez
9 October 2015	1	"Alright"	Kendrick Lamar
16 October 2015	2	"What Do You Mean?"	Justin Bieber
30 October 2015	1	"Where Ya At"	Future featuring Drake
6 November 2015	1	"Drag Me Down"	One Direction
13 November 2015	1	"Locked Away"	R. City featuring Adam Levine
20 November 2015	1	"Wildest Dreams"	Taylor Swift
27 November 2015	1	"Energy"	Drake
4 December 2015	1	"Hotline Bling"	Drake
11 December 2015	1 of 2	"Hello"	Adele
18 December 2015	No chart		
25 December 2015	No chart		

=== 2016 ===
Date	Weeks @ No. 1	Song	Performer
1 January 2016	No chart		
8 January 2016	2 of 2	"Hello"	Adele
15 January 2016	1	"Sorry"	Justin Bieber
22 January 2016	1	"Tell Your Friends"	The Weeknd
29 January 2016	1	"White Iverson"	Post Malone
5 February 2016	1	"Same Old Love"	Selena Gomez
12 February 2016	1	"Antidote"	Travis Scott
19 February 2016	1	"I'll Show You"	Justin Bieber
26 February 2016	1	"Stressed Out"	Twenty One Pilots
4 March 2016	1	"Perfect"	One Direction
11 March 2016	1	"Hello"	Hedley
18 March 2016	1	"I Know What You Did Last Summer"	Shawn Mendes and Camila Cabello
25 March 2016	1	"Flesh Without Blood"	Grimes
1 April 2016	1	"Cake by the Ocean"	DNCE
8 April 2016	1	"Roses"	The Chainsmokers featuring Rozes
15 April 2016	1	"Pillowtalk"	Zayn
22 April 2016	1	"Out of the Woods"	Taylor Swift
29 April 2016	1	"Might Not"	Belly featuring The Weeknd
6 May 2016	1	"Hands to Myself"	Selena Gomez
13 May 2016	1	"Love Yourself"	Justin Bieber
20 May 2016	1	"7 Years"	Lukas Graham
27 May 2016	1	"Work"	Rihanna featuring Drake
3 June 2016	1	"Work from Home"	Fifth Harmony featuring Ty Dolla Sign
10 June 2016	1	"Wild Things"	Alessia Cara
17 June 2016	1	"Spirits"	The Strumbellas
24 June 2016	1	"I Took a Pill in Ibiza"	Mike Posner
1 July 2016	1	"Close"	Nick Jonas featuring Tove Lo
8 July 2016	1	"Panda"	Desiigner
15 July 2016	1	"Don't Let Me Down"	The Chainsmokers featuring Daya
22 July 2016	1	"Lose Control"	Hedley
29 July 2016	1	"Can't Stop the Feeling!"	Justin Timberlake
5 August 2016	1	"Dangerous Woman"	Ariana Grande
12 August 2016	1	"Company"	Justin Bieber
19 August 2016	1	"Lost Boy"	Ruth B
26 August 2016	1	"This Is What You Came For"	Calvin Harris featuring Rihanna
2 September 2016	1	"Send My Love (To Your New Lover)"	Adele
9 September 2016	1	"Into You"	Ariana Grande
16 September 2016	1	"Treat You Better"	Shawn Mendes
23 September 2016	1	"Heathens"	Twenty One Pilots
30 September 2016	1	"This Girl"	Kungs vs Cookin' on 3 Burners
7 October 2016	1	"Cold Water"	Major Lazer featuring Justin Bieber and MØ
14 October 2016	1	"Scars to Your Beautiful"	Alessia Cara
21 October 2016	1	"Luv"	Tory Lanez
28 October 2016	1	"Starboy"	The Weeknd featuring Daft Punk
4 November 2016	1	"Side to Side"	Ariana Grande featuring Nicki Minaj
11 November 2016	1	"Perfect Illusion"	Lady Gaga
18 November 2016	1	"R.E.D."	A Tribe Called Red featuring Yasiin Bey, Narcy and Black Bear
25 November 2016	1	"Closer"	The Chainsmokers featuring Halsey
2 December 2016	1	"Mercy"	Shawn Mendes
9 December 2016	1	"Fireproof"	Coleman Hell
16 December 2016	1	"24K Magic"	Bruno Mars
23 December 2016	No chart		
30 December 2016	No chart		

=== 2017 ===
Date	Weeks @ No. 1	Song	Performer
6 January 2017	No chart		
13 January 2017	1	"Black Beatles"	Rae Sremmurd featuring Gucci Mane
20 January 2017	1	"Not Nice"	PartyNextDoor
27 January 2017	2	"This Town"	Niall Horan
10 February 2017	1	"Broccoli"	DRAM featuring Lil Yachty
17 February 2017	1	"Bad Things"	Machine Gun Kelly and Camila Cabello
24 February 2017	1	"Million Reasons"	Lady Gaga
3 March 2017	1	"Bad and Boujee"	Migos featuring Lil Uzi Vert
10 March 2017	1	"Shape of You"	Ed Sheeran
17 March 2017	1	"I Don't Wanna Live Forever"	Zayn and Taylor Swift
24 March 2017	1	"Paris"	The Chainsmokers
31 March 2017	1	"Say You Won't Let Go"	James Arthur
7 April 2017	1	"Castle on the Hill"	Ed Sheeran
14 April 2017	1	"Congratulations"	Post Malone featuring Quavo
21 April 2017	1	"Chained to the Rhythm"	Katy Perry featuring Skip Marley
28 April 2017	1	"Rockabye"	Clean Bandit featuring Sean Paul and Anne-Marie
5 May 2017	1	"Green Light"	Lorde
12 May 2017	1	"I Feel It Coming"	The Weeknd featuring Daft Punk
19 May 2017	2	"Easy Go"	Grandtheft featuring Delaney Jane
2 June 2017	1	"Humble"	Kendrick Lamar
9 June 2017	1	"That's What I Like"	Bruno Mars
16 June 2017	1	"Believer"	Imagine Dragons
23 June 2017	1	"Run Up"	Major Lazer featuring PartyNextDoor and Nicki Minaj
30 June 2017	1	"I'm the One"	DJ Khaled featuring Justin Bieber, Quavo, Chance the Rapper and Lil Wayne
7 July 2017	1	"Stay"	Zedd and Alessia Cara
14 July 2017	1	"Sign of the Times"	Harry Styles
21 July 2017	1	"It Ain't Me"	Kygo and Selena Gomez
28 July 2017	1	"Mask Off"	Future
4 August 2017	1	"Unforgettable"	French Montana featuring Swae Lee
11 August 2017	1	"Everything Now"	Arcade Fire
18 August 2017	1	"Wild Thoughts"	DJ Khaled featuring Rihanna and Bryson Tiller
25 August 2017	1	"Feels"	Calvin Harris featuring Pharrell Williams, Katy Perry and Big Sean
1 September 2017	1	"There's Nothing Holdin' Me Back"	Shawn Mendes
8 September 2017	1	"Lust for Life"	Lana Del Rey featuring The Weeknd
15 September 2017	1	"Fetish"	Selena Gomez featuring Gucci Mane
22 September 2017	1	"Butterfly Effect"	Travis Scott
29 September 2017	1	"What About Us"	Pink
6 October 2017	2	"Look What You Made Me Do"	Taylor Swift
20 October 2017	2	"Young Dumb & Broke"	Khalid
3 November 2017	1	"Learn to Let Go"	Kesha
10 November 2017	1	"We Find Love/Blessed"	Daniel Caesar
17 November 2017	1	"1-800-273-8255"	Logic featuring Alessia Cara and Khalid
