= Saturday People =

Studio album by Prozzäk
- Released: November 7, 2000
- Recorded: 2000
- Genre: Pop, pop rock
- Length: 40:02
- Label: Sony
- Producer: Jason Levine, James McCollum, Lenny DeRose

Prozzäk chronology
| Hot Show (1998) | Saturday People (2000) | Ready Ready Set Go (2002) |

Singles from Saturday People
- 1. "www.nevergetoveryou" Released: 2000; 2. "Be As" Released: 2001; 3. "It's Not Me It's You" Released: 2001

Saturday People is the second studio album by Canadian pop duo Prozzäk. This album was only released in Canada, on 7 November 2000. The album was nominated for "Best Pop Album" at the 2002 Juno Awards.

== Track listing ==
All tracks are written by James McCollum and Jason Levine, except where noted.

| No. | Title | Lyrics | Music | Length |
|---|---|---|---|---|
| 1. | "Saturday People Story" | | Jeff Dalziel | 1:28 |
| 2. | "Pretty Girls" | | | 2:55 |
| 3. | "www.nevergetoveryou" | | | 3:29 |
| 4. | "Be As" | | | 3:36 |
| 5. | "It's Not Me It's You" | | Pyotr Ilyich Tchaikovsky | 2:46 |
| 6. | "Infatuation" | Iris Fraser | | 3:40 |
| 7. | "Saturday People" | | | 4:06 |
| 8. | "Feed the Night" | | | 3:16 |
| 9. | "Usted Es Muy Loco" | | | 3:10 |
| 10. | "Introduction to a Broken Heart" | | | 4:23 |
| 11. | "Monday Morning" | | | 3:07 |
| 12. | "Lonely American Nights" | | | 4:11 |
| Total length: | | | | 40:02 |

The verse medley for "It's Not Me It's You" is taken from "The Dance of the Sugar Plum Fairies" in Pyotr Ilyich Tchaikovsky's The Nutcracker Suite.

CD-Extra section

1. Video clip: "Live Footage" (Hot Show concert)
2. Video clip: The Prozzäk Story
3. Music video: "Strange Disease"
4. Music video: "Sucks to Be You"

== Year-end charts ==
Year-end chart performance for Saturday People
| Chart (2000) | Position |
|---|---|
| Canadian Albums (Nielsen SoundScan) | 196 |
