= Ready Ready Set Go =

First compilation album by Prozzäk

Compilation album by Simon and Milo
- Released: April 30, 2002
- Recorded: 1998–2002
- Genre: Pop
- Label: Hollywood Records

Simon and Milo chronology
Saturday People (2000)	Ready Ready Set Go (2002)	Cruel Cruel World (2005)

Singles from Ready Ready Set Go
- 1. "Get a Clue" Released: 2002

Ready Ready Set Go is the first compilation album (and third album overall) by Canadian musical duo Prozzäk, released under the name Simon and Milo, by Hollywood Records on April 30, 2002. This was a limited edition CD and also enhanced with three bonus videos. The album's name is taken from the opening line from "Pretty Girls (Make Me Nervous)", the first track on the album. All of the tracks were taken from the two previous albums, Hot Show and Saturday People, with the exception of the one new track introduced on the album, "Get a Clue", a theme song for the TV movie of the same name starring Lindsay Lohan. "Get a Clue" is also a featured track in the video game Disney's Extreme Skate Adventure, and its accompanying music video is an unlockable video in the extras section of the game.

AllMusic remarked about the album, "It may be more of a guilty pleasure for some listeners than others, but Ready Ready Set Go is a pure-pop blast."

== Track listing ==
1. "Pretty Girls" - 2:55
2. "Omobolasire" - 3:41
3. "Sucks To Be You" - 3:21
4. "www.nevergetoveryou" - 3:29
5. "Get A Clue" - 3:18
6. "Be As" - 3:36
7. "Infatuation" - 3:40
8. "It's Not Me It's You" - 2:46
9. "Strange Disease" - 3:26
10. "Europa" - 3:30

Enhanced CD videos:

1. The Legend of Simon And Milo
2. Omobolasire
3. Sucks to Be You
- Tracks 1, 4 and 6–8 are from Saturday People.
- Track 5 is a new track, recorded for the Disney Channel Original Movie Get a Clue.
- Tracks 2–3 and 9–10 are from Hot Show.
