= B4-4 (album) =

Studio album by B4-4
- Released: June 6, 2000
- Recorded: 1999–2000
- Genre: Pop
- Length: 45:42
- Label: Columbia
- Producers: James McCollum, Jamie Houston, Jason Levine, Lenny De Rose, Mike Roth, Peter Cardinali, Stephan Moccio

B4-4 chronology
B4-4 (2000)	In Your Face (2003)

B4-4 (stylized as b4-4) is the debut album by Canadian boy band B4-4, released on June 6, 2000. It includes the successful tracks "Get Down", "Go Go", "Everyday", and "Endlessly". The album debuted at #38 on the Canadian Albums Chart, and was certified Platinum (100,000 copies) in Canada in April 2001.

== Track listing ==
1. "Really Gotta Want It"
2. "Ball & Chain"
3. "That's How I Know"
4. "Go Go"
5. "Everyday"
6. "Smile"
7. "Get Down"
8. "Don't Let the Sun Catch You Cryin'"
9. "How Did We End Up Here"
10. "You've Got a Friend"
11. "Savin' for a Rainy Day"
12. "Endlessly"

== Production ==
- Art Direction, Design – Steve Goode
- Coordinator [Production] – Tanya Nagowski
- Edited By [Digital Editing] – Blair Robb, Darius Szczepaniak, Denis Tougas, R. H. Leavens
- Engineer – Darius Szczepaniak, Darrel Moen, Diesel, Jamie Houston, Lenny De Rose
- Executive-Producer – Michael Roth
- Management – Ray Danniels, Steve Hoffman
- Mastered By – P. Letros
- Mixed By – Joel Soyffer (tracks: 3), Lenny De Rose (tracks: 1, 2, 4 to 12)
- Photography By, Artwork [Digital Imaging] –Dan Couto
- Producer – James McCollum (tracks: 4, 5, 7, 10, 12), Jamie Houston (tracks: 3), Jason Levine* (tracks: 4, 5, 7, 10, 12), Lenny De Rose* (tracks: 2, 6, 10), Mike Roth (tracks: 2, 6, 12), Peter Cardinali (tracks: 1, 8), Stephan Moccio(tracks: 2, 6, 9, 11, 12)

== Year-end charts ==
Chart (2000)	Position
Canadian Albums (Nielsen SoundScan)	108
