= The Very Thought of You (Nicole Henry album) =

Studio album by Nicole Henry
- Released: August 19, 2008
- Studios: Afterhours Recording Studios, Miami, FL; The Hit Factory, New York, NY
- Genre: Jazz
- Length: 50:08
- Label: Banister Records
- Producers: Hal Batt; Nicole Henry

Nicole Henry chronology
Teach Me Tonight (2005)	The Very Thought of You (2008)	Embraceable (2011)

The Very Thought of You is the third album by Nicole Henry. It was released through Banister Records on September 19, 2008. The album charted on the Billboard Traditional Jazz Albums chart at No. 7 and No. 18 on the Jazz Albums chart.

== Track listing ==
No.	Title	Writer(s)	Length
1.	"That's All"	Alan Brandt; Bob Haymes	4:42
2.	"Almost Like Being in Love"	Alan Jay Lerner; Frederick Loewe	4:10
3.	"I Can't Be Bothered Now"	George Gershwin; Ira Gershwin	2:56
4.	"Waters of March"	Antônio Carlos Jobim	3:36
5.	"What'll I Do"	Irving Berlin	4:20
6.	"I Found You"	Karen Jeannne Denhert	4:22
7.	"All That I Can See"	Nicole Henry; James Bryan McCollum	3:52
8.	"All the Way"	Sammy Cahn; James Van Heusen	3:40
9.	"I'm Gonna Lock My Heart"	Jimmy Eaton; Terry Shand	2:53
10.	"At Last"	Mack Gordon; Harry Warren	5:08
11.	"The Very Thought of You"	Ray Noble	5:16
12.	"Make It Last"	Bob Haymes; Paxton	5:13
Total length:			50:08

Track information and credits adapted from the album's liner notes.

== Musicians ==
- Nicole Henry – vocals
- Danny Burger – drums (Tracks 1–2, 9–10)
- David Chiverton – drums (Track 7)
- Orlando Hernandez – drums (Tracks 3–6, 8, 12)
- Sammy Figueroa – percussion (Track 4)
- Aaron Fishbein – guitar (Track 7)
- Manny López – guitar (Track 6)
- Mariana Martin – guitar (Track 4)
- James Bryan McCollum – guitar (Track 7)
- Brian Michael Murphy – keyboards (Tracks 1–10), piano (Tracks 1–2, 9–10)
- Mike Orta – arranger, keyboards (Tracks 4, 6–7, 12), piano (Tracks 4, 6–7, 11–12)
- Jaui Schneider – piano (Tracks 3, 5, 8)
- Jamie Ousley – upright bass (Tracks 3–8, 12)
- Paul Shewchuk – upright bass (Tracks 1–2, 9–10)

== Production ==
- Nicole Henry – Producer, Executive Producer
- Hal Batt – Producer, Mixing, Recording Engineer (Track 7), Vocal Recording Engineer (Tracks 7–12)
- Carlos Alvarez – Recording Engineer (Tracks 1, 3–6, 8, 11–12), Vocal Recording Engineer (Tracks 1–6)
- Ron Taylor – Recording Engineer (Tracks 2, 9–10)
- Don Mizell – Executive Producer
- Bruce Weeden – Mastering
- Rachel Faro – Production Assistant
- Patrick Magee – Assistant Engineer (Tracks 1–6, 8–12)
- Daniel Lugo – Photography

== Charts ==
Chart (2008)	Peak position
US Traditional Jazz (Billboard)	7
US Top Jazz Albums (Billboard)	18
