= Automatic (Danny Fernandes song) =

Single by Danny Fernandes featuring Belly

from the album AutomaticLUV
- Released: August 31, 2010 (iTunes)
- Recorded: 2010
- Genre: Pop; dance
- Length: 3:10
- Label: CP Records
- Songwriters: Ahmad Balshe, Danny Fernandes, Alexander Vujic
- Producer: Alex 'Pilzbury' Vujic

Danny Fernandes singles chronology
"Addicted" (2009)	"Automatic" (2010)	"Girlfriend" (2010)

Belly singles chronology
"Hot Girl" (2009)	"Automatic" (2010)	"Hit Me Up" (2011)

"Automatic" is a 2010 single by Canadian singer Danny Fernandes featuring Canadian rapper Belly from Fernandes's second studio album AutomaticLUV.

"Automatic", released on CP Records, is the first single from his new album after five consecutive singles from his debut album Intro.

== Music video ==
In the video (directed by Mike Portoghese), Danny Fernandes plays a robot version of himself. Belly plays a cyborg commanding an army of faceless troops. MuchMusic observed influence from Janet Jackson's "Feedback" video in its cyborg theme. The video girl features Canadian actress Lana Tailor (who also appears again in Take Me Away).

== Chart performance ==
The song debuted at number 82 on the week of September 25, 2010. A month later, it peaked at number 41 on the week of November 6, 2010 and later spent an additional thirteen weeks on the chart.

Chart (2010)	Peak Position
Canada CHR/Top 40 (Billboard)	20
Canada (Canadian Hot 100)	41
