= Hit Me Up =

Hit Me Up may refer to:

- "Hit Me Up" (Danny Fernandes song), 2011
- "Hit Me Up" (Gia Farrell song), 2006
- "Hit Me Up", a 2019 song by Omar Apollo featuring Dominic Fike and Kenny Beats
- "Hit Me Up", a 2007 song by Reyez featuring Pitbull
- "Hit Me Up", a 2019 song by Stefflon Don
- "Hit Me Up", a 2024 song by Timethai

== See also ==
- "Hit 'Em Up", song by 2Pac featuring Outlawz
