= Private dancer =

Private dancer may refer to:

- Private Dancer, a 1984 album by Tina Turner
  - "Private Dancer" (Tina Turner song), a song on the album Private Dancer by Tina Turner
- "Private Dancer" (Danny Fernandes song), a 2008 song
- "Private Dancer" (Quantum Leap), a 1991 television episode
- A dancer who performs a striptease
- A taxi dancer
