= Prozzäk =

Canadian musical duo

- Simon (left) and Milo (right)

Background information
- Also known as: Simon and Milo
- Origin: Toronto, Ontario, Canada
- Genres: Pop, dance-pop, pop rock
- Years active: 1998–2008; 2015–2019; 2022–present
- Labels: Sony/Epic; Hollywood; MapleMusic
- Spinoff of: The Philosopher Kings
- Members: Jason "Jay" Levine (Simon); James Bryan McCollum (Milo)

Prozzäk (also known as Simon and Milo) are a Canadian virtual pop music duo formed by Jay Levine and James Bryan McCollum in 1998. Their recordings and animated music videos tell the comedic tale of their alter egos, Simon (Levine) and Milo (McCollum), who are best friends on a search to find true love.

Since their formation, the duo have released four studio albums and received four Juno Award nominations. Prozzäk was also among the top 80 best-selling Canadian artists in Canada from the year of their beginning to 2016.

== History ==
In the 1990s, Levine and McCollum were members of the Philosopher Kings, a Canadian R&B band. After a physical altercation between them, they attempted to smooth things over by writing music together. While on a European tour with the Kings, the two created a comedic song titled "Europa" in which they sang in British accents. The song did not fit in with the music produced by the Philosopher Kings. However, the band's record company, Sony Canada, approved of it. As such, the two set aside their differences and created Prozzäk in 1998. The band name was inspired by the drug Prozac.

The decision to portray the band through animation came as a result of Levine feeling uncomfortable performing with an accent. The duo developed the look of Simon and Milo with illustrator Scott Harder. The band scripted and storyboarded the initial music videos with Sony's Marc Lostracco. They were animated by Evening Sky/Animation House.

Their first album, Hot Show, was released in late 1998. The album featured the hit singles "Sucks to Be You" and "Strange Disease" and was certified triple platinum in Canada. Prozzäk was nominated for Best New Group at the 2000 Juno Awards, as well as being nominated for Best Album (Hot Show), Best Single ("Sucks to Be You"), and Best Video ("Strange Disease"). In 2000, Levine and McCollum wrote and produced several songs for Canadian pop group B4-4, including their hit song "Get Down". In late 2000, Prozzäk released their second album, Saturday People, on Epic Records. The album included the singles "www.nevergetoveryou" and "Be As". The album was certified gold in Canada and nominated for Best Pop Album at the 2002 Juno Awards.

Prozzäk joined with Disney to increase promotion and released the album Ready Ready Set Go, also named Simon and Milo. It is a compilation of songs from their first two albums along with a new single, "Get a Clue" which was written for the television movie Get a Clue starring Lindsay Lohan. The duo were also developing an animated series with Disney, but it would ultimately go unproduced due to creative differences, as elements of the band would have been toned down to suit a more family friendly audience.

Prozzäk's next album, Cruel Cruel World was released by MapleMusic in 2005. Cruel Cruel World was released on an independent label and did not receive as much promotion as their first two albums, nor did it achieve the same success. The album overhauled Simon and Milo's character designs while Simon’s exaggerated British accent was significantly toned down in conjunction with the album's darker, more serious tone. It also lacked the comedic narrative skits featured in previous Prozzak albums and featured no vocals from Milo. The album's lead single "When I Think of You" received an animated music video directed by Frederick Marcello Wilmot at Horus Productions. Two songs were released online in 2006, "DJ-J-Vox" and "DJ (Calibe Remix)".

In 2008, the band released a song titled "Chloe the Chicken" on a kids' album titled Roll Play.

=== Reunions ===
After being inactive for several years, Prozzäk performed a reunion concert at the Atomic Lollipop Festival in Toronto on July 18, 2015, where they debuted a new song. Entitled "Baby I Need Your Love (Pussy Cat Pussy Cat)", its September 18, 2015 release became their first single in a decade. This was followed by "Love Fools Anonymous" on June 15, 2016; in November of that year they released "My Little Snowflake".

On February 3, 2017, Prozzäk released the single "Love Me Tinder" from an album in progress. An animated music video by Kevin Muhlbach for the single debuted on March 17. Titled Forever 1999, the album was released on March 31, 2017. It was supported by a tour across Canada that spring. In March 2018, the band attempted to launch Prozzak: Love Addicts, an animated series produced by Portfolio Entertainment and Duopoly. The project didn't receive financing and went unproduced.

In September 2018, Prozzäk toured across Canada with Aqua and Whigfield as part of the "Rewind Tour".

On September 9, 2019, Prozzäk announced that they would embark on their final tour, titled the "Never Get Over You Farewell Tour". On May 22, 2022, Prozzäk reunited to perform at "Fizzfest" in Toronto, opening for Bran Van 3000. On August 25, 2023, Prozzäk performed as part of "Y2K @ Churchill Square" for Edmonton's Pride Festival.

== Simon and Milo ==
Prozzäk are two animated characters named Simon and Milo. The creation of Simon and Milo initially began with accents suggested by the other members of The Philosopher Kings during their road trips. The cartoon characters designed by artist Scott Harder became a part of Prozzäk.

In The Prozzäk Story video, Simon and Milo are over 200 years old and were enemies in a previous life. Simon and Milo fought each other in a 20-year-old war called "Ochiyaki". During their battle with each other, a Great Unseen Voice projected down from the sky and told them they were to be best friends, sent through time to the 21st century, where they were given a mission. That mission was for the two to find true love through their music. The story is based on the formation of the duo.

In their music videos, Simon, a short and skinny man with jet-black hair and no neck, is in constant search of his true love, believing that the perfect woman is out there. As a result, Simon ends up feeling depressed. Milo is a tall and muscular man with blond hair who accompanies Simon on his quest. Their introduction in the album Saturday People tells of their many visits to nightclubs and bars in hopes of finding true love, after which Simon gives up, and lies "face down in his own banana milkshake". Just then, the Great Unseen Voice from the heavens calls out, telling them that they have lost their way, and reminds them that only True Love holds the key to their destiny. Their music thus represents their social journey to find their true love.

== Band members ==
Levine is the lead singer of Prozzäk and the voice behind Simon. Through the music, Simon tells stories that represent Levine's actual life; for example, the song "Anna-Lisa" makes reference to his parents' divorce. Levine has founded a company, Lefthook Entertainment, that helps artists market their music. He is also currently an artist under the name Today Kid.

McCollum is the guitarist and portrays Milo. He is the founder of UMI Entertainment based in Toronto. He also plays guitar for fellow Canadian recording artist Nelly Furtado.

== Discography ==
=== Studio albums ===
Year	Title	Peak chart positions	Certifications
Year	Title	CAN	CAN
1998	Hot Show	8	3× Platinum
2000	Saturday People	27	Gold
2005	Cruel Cruel World	—	
2017	Forever 1999	—	

=== Compilation albums ===
- Ready Ready Set Go (as "Simon and Milo") (April 30, 2002) – Hollywood Records

=== Singles ===
Year	Song	Chart peak	Album
Year	Song	CAN	Album
1998	"Omobolasire"	50	Hot Show
1999	"Sucks to Be You"	25	Hot Show
1999	"Strange Disease"	52	Hot Show
1999	"Europa"	45	Hot Show
2000	"New York"	—	Hot Show
2000	"www.nevergetoveryou"	23	Saturday People
2001	"Be As"	—	Saturday People
2001	"It's Not Me It's You"	—	Saturday People
2002	"Get a Clue"	—	Ready Ready Set Go
2015	"Baby I Need Your Love (Pussy Cat, Pussy Cat)"	—	Forever 1999
2016	"Love Fools Anonymous"	—	Forever 1999
2016	"My Little Snowflake"	—	Forever 1999
2017	"Love Me Tinder"	—	Forever 1999
"—" denotes a release that did not chart.
