= Girlfriend (Tyler Medeiros song) =

Single by Tyler Medeiros featuring Danny Fernandes

from the EP TM
- Released: October 26, 2010 (iTunes)
- Recorded: 2010
- Genre: Pop, electropop
- Length: 2:54
- Label: CP Records
- Songwriters: Chenoa Lynn Chapman, Danny Fernandes, Jilian Gramma, Maksim Gabriel Knecht, Dan Kowarsky, Ryan Kowarsky, Tony Salibi
- Producers: Dan Kowarsky; Ryan Kowarsky

Tyler Medeiros singles chronology
"Girlfriend" (2010)	"Say I Love You (Please Don't Go)" (2011)

Danny Fernandes singles chronology
"Automatic" (2010)	"Girlfriend" (2011)	"Take Me Away" (2011)

"Girlfriend" is a song from Canadian pop singer Tyler Medeiros and was the debut single off his debut EP TM. The song features guest vocals from fellow CP Records labelmate and cousin Danny Fernandes. The song was released on October 26, 2010 on iTunes. Lyrically, the song is a 'boy-meets-girl' story in that he will do anything for her if she was his 'girlfriend'. The song peaked at number 90 on the Canadian Hot 100.

== Music video ==
On November 16, 2010 Tyler held a contest on his Facebook page in which one lucky fan would get a chance to appear in his video. Shooting for the video started on November 30, 2010 in Mississauga, Ontario at Playdium. The video was helmed by Marc André Debruyne.

== Chart performance ==
The song debuted at number 100 on the Canadian Hot 100 on the week of March 12, 2011 before falling off the next week. On the week of March 26, 2011 the song re-charted and reached a new peak at number 90.

Chart (2010)	Peak position
Canada (Canadian Hot 100)	90
