= Bullying Awareness Week =

Canadian anti-bullying campaign

Bullying Awareness Week is a national campaign in Canada conceived of by Canadian educator and Bullying.org president Bill Belsey. It was launched in 2003 by Family Channel and bullying.org. The campaign takes place during the third week each November and aims to raise awareness about bullying amongst students in Canada while promoting positive relationships and providing youth with real-life solutions to help them deal with bullying behaviour.

Bullying Awareness Week is recognized in communities across Canada. In 2009 the week was officially recognized by the city of Calgary.

== History ==
=== 2004 Campaign, November 15–22 – Take the Pledge ===
The 2004 campaign included a week of special programming on Family Channel; the launch of a new Public Service Announcement (PSA), called "The Cool Table", demonstrating the part that bystanders can play in remedying bullying; and an interactive website where Canadians could "Take the Pledge" as well as tell their stories of standing up to bullying. Schools across Canada also held events and organized initiatives during the week and throughout the school year, to stop bullying and draw awareness to the part that bystanders play. The pledge is taken 175,000 times.

Family Channel Stars involved: Raven-Symoné That's So Raven, Kate Todd Radio Free Roscoe, Nathan Stephenson Radio Free Roscoe, Ali Mukaddam, Radio Free Roscoe.

Premieres: Beautiful Girl, Original Movie

=== 2005 Campaign, November 14–20 – Take the Pledge ===
In 2005, Family Channel and bullying.org expanded the campaign to address teachers and parents in addition to Canadian youth. A Teacher's Guide was developed in part with the Canadian Initiative for the Prevention of Bullying (CIPB). The guide was distributed to all English-language schools in Canada. Additional campaign resources included two new Public Service Announcements titled "Alone" and "The Pledge" these aired on Family Channel in addition to "The Cool Table" PSA from 2004.

=== 2006 Campaign, November 13–19 – Stand UP! ===
For the fourth consecutive year, Family Channel and Bullying.org Canada worked together to institute national Bullying Awareness Week. The campaign became "Stand UP!". Family Channel began holding rallies in schools across Canada. Over 10,000 kids nominated their school as a venue for the Stand UP! rally. Three were selected: George Waters Middle School; Winnipeg, Manitoba, Ruth King Elementary School; Victoria, British Columbia, and Convent Glen Catholic School; Ottawa, Ontario. Stand UP! cuffs were available online at family.ca and at La Senza Girl with proceeds going to Bullying.org. Additional campaign resources included a new PSA featuring Life with Derek star Michael Seater.

Family Channel Stars involved: Michael Seater Life with Derek, Ashley Leggat Life with Derek

=== 2007 Campaign, November 19–25 – Stand UP! ===
This year saw the first ever bullying prevention-themed episode created from one of Family Channel's Canadian original series. The episode "The Bully Brothers" from Life with Derek was produced. As an additional teaching tool for students and educators, a Teacher's Guide for the show is produced by PREVNet. The episode was previewed during the rallies at the four selected schools (Cove Cliff Elementary School; North Vancouver, British Columbia, Sir James Lougheed Elementary School; Calgary, Alberta, Fairvale Elementary School; Rothensay, New Brunswick, Pleasantville Public School; Richmond Hill, Ontario.)

Family Channel Stars involved: Michael Seater Life with Derek, Ashley Leggat Life with Derek, Christopher Massey Zoey 101, Matthew Underwood Zoey 101

Premieres: Life with Derek "The Bully Brothers"

=== 2008 Campaign, November 17–23 - Stand UP! ===
The 2008 campaign featured actors from the Family Channel series The Latest Buzz. Actress Vanessa Morgan performed the song that anchored the campaign and a music video. Students submitted their own original song lyrics and essays to nominate their schools for rallies. Rallies were held at: Highbury School; Winnipeg, Manitoba, Tomekichi Homma Elementary School; Richmond, British Columbia, Winston Churchill Public School and Kingston, Ontario. The Bullying Awareness Week cuff was sold.

Family Channel Stars involved: Vanessa Morgan The Latest Buzz, Munro Chambers The Latest Buzz, Demetrius Joyette The Latest Buzz, Zoe Belkin The Latest Buzz, Justin Kelly The Latest Buzz

Premieres: The Latest Buzz "The Peer Pressure Issue"

=== 2009 Campaign, November 16–22 – Stand UP! Catch the Wave ===
For 2009, Family Channel asked viewers to "Catch the Wave" as they encouraged students in schools to take part in a televised, Guinness World Record- breaking attempt - a cross-country wave. The wave travelled from West to East across Canada and saw 300 schools participate. The wave attempt was televised on Family Channel and featured five schools:Colby Village Elementary; Dartmouth, Nova Scotia, Faraday Elementary School; Winnipeg, Manitoba, Mildred Hall School; Yellowknife, Northwest Territories, Irwin Park Elementary; Vancouver, British Columbia and École Forest Trail Public School; Oakville, Ontario. The Latest Buzz produced its second special episode for Bullying Awareness Week and a Teacher's Guide was produced. Family Channel worked with Nico Archambault (Season 1 winner of So You Think You Can Dance Canada) and txt.carbon to create Rise Above T-shirts with proceeds going to PREVNet.

Family Channel Stars involved: Michael SeaterLife with Derek, Ashley Leggat Life with Derek, Vanessa Morgan The Latest Buzz, Munro Chambers The Latest Buzz, Demetrius Joyette The Latest Buzz, Zoe Belkin The Latest Buzz, Justin Kelly The Latest Buzz, Jacob Kraemer, Overruled!, Jasmine Richards, Overruled!

Premieres: The Latest Buzz "The Bullying Issue"

=== 2010 Campaign, November 15–21 – Sing Stand UP!/ Stand UP! Coast 2 Coast ===
The eighth year of Bullying Awareness Week saw three Canadian artists: Nikki Yanofsky, Lindsay Hamilton and Saveria contribute songs to the campaign. Special music videos were created for each song and seen on-air on Family Channel and online at family.ca. Students from across Canada nominated their schools for a Stand UP! rally, this year hosted by Overruled! star Jacob Kraemer. These rallies were won by four schools: Cardigan Consolidated School; Cardigan, Prince Edward Island, Altona Forest Public School; Pickering, Ontario, Dr. L.M. Hanna Elementary School; Regina, Saskatchewan and John Henderson Elementary; Vancouver, British Columbia. Each school was featured in the Stand UP! Coast 2 Coast documentaries that aired on Family Channel. A special bullying prevention episode from the series Wingin' It was created with script input from PREVNet, Family Channel hosted two live online web chats for students to voice their questions and concerns about bullying. The chats featured Family Channel's on air host Lindsay Hamilton and PREVNet representative Dr. Joanne Cummings. The Campaign won a bronze 2011 CTAM MARK Award for Partnership with Non-Profit Organizations - Multimedia Campaign.

Family Channel Stars involved: Jacob Kraemer Overruled!, Lindsay Hamilton on-air host, Saveria

Premieres: Wingin' It "Bully Elliot"

CTV supported Bullying Awareness Week in 2010 through the Love is Louder campaign. This campaign saw CTV stars talk out on their own experiences with bullying and featured a week of special programming across CTV channels.

=== 2011 Campaign, November 14–20 – What's Up, Stand UP! ===
The ninth year of Bullying Awareness Week saw an evening of programming dedicated to bullying prevention air on Family Channel on Monday, November 14 from 4 p.m. – 8 p.m. ET. The night was presented by the cast of the Family Channel original production, What's Up, Warthogs! and featured interviews with celebrities including Cody Simpson, Selena Gomez and Bella Thorne as well as with a representative from Kids Help Phone. The theme song for the campaign was 'What's Up, Stand Up' performed by Canadian pop star Tyler Medeiros and written by RyanDan members Ryan Kowarsky and Dan Kowarsky as well as Maks Gabriel. Family visited four schools across Canada with Stand UP! rallies: St. Michael's; Burnaby BC, Barkers Point Elementary; Fredericton, NB, Blessed John XXIII; Mississauga, ON, Westcreek Public School; Pickering, ON. Family Channel also hosted two online chats on November 15 and November 17, 7 p.m. – 8:30 p.m. EST with the Ana Golja (November 15) and Tiago Abreu (November 17) from What's Up, Warthogs! Along with representatives from PREVNet and Kids Help Phone.

Family Channel Stars involved: Eduard Witzke, Karissa Lee Staples, Ana Golja, Tiago Abreu (all What's Up, Warthogs!), Lindsay Hamilton (on-air host), Sydney Imbeau "Really Me!", Zendaya, Bella Thorne "Shake It Up (TV series) ", Dylan Everett and Demetrius Joyette (both "Wingin' It".

Musical Acts involved: Tyler Medeiros, Allstar Weekend, Cody Simpson, Selena Gomez

=== 2012 Campaign, November 12–17 ===
The tenth annual Bullying Awareness Week took place Monday, November 12 to Sunday, November 17.

=== 2013 Campaign, November 17–23 ===
The eleventh annual Bullying Awareness Week took place Monday, November 17 to Sunday, November 23.

=== 2014 Campaign, November 16–24 ===
The twelfth annual Bullying Awareness Week took place Monday, November 16 to Sunday, November 24.

== See also ==
- Bullying
- Anti-Bullying Day
- International STAND UP to Bullying Day
- School Bullying
- School violence
