= Breathe Again (Danny Fernandes album) =

Studio album by Danny Fernandes
- Released: August 27, 2013
- Recorded: 2012–13
- Genre: Pop; R&B
- Length: 42:53
- Label: CP Records

Danny Fernandes chronology
AutomaticLUV (2010)	Breathe Again (2013)

Singles from Breathe Again
- 1. "Fly Again (Broken Wings)" Released: February 22, 2013; 2. "Come Back Down" Released: July 9, 2013

Breathe Again is the third studio album by Canadian recording artist Danny Fernandes. It was released on CP Records on August 27, 2013. The album is his first to feature a parental advisory warning label.

== Writing and recording ==
The album was originally to be titled Emotional, due to Fernandes' experiences with the darker aspects of fame. In an interview with Kiss 92.5, Fernandes revealed that his new record will contain "a lot of sad stuff". On the album's writing and recording process, he said: "I took a year off from everything and focused on this album. I wrote the whole thing and honestly I wrote it about this whole experience, this breakup and the two years I was in a mess. Just being able to write was amazing. My label sent me away to Los Angeles and said, 'Don't come back until you're done writing a whole album.' So it was great just to get away. And there wasn't much collaboration; most of the producers were friends of mine in Los Angeles." Fernandes co-wrote and wrote all of the songs on the album. He said of the album's overall vibe: "There's really not any 'happy' songs on the album. I went through a lot in the last four years, I just thought I'd put it all on this record."

== Singles ==
"Fly Again (Broken Wings)" was released on February 22, 2013 as a digital download, and serves and the album's first single. Its chorus is sampled from the 1985 hit "Broken Wings" by Mr. Mister. The single has yet to chart. The song is a notable departure from his previous singles, featuring a "darker" music video about the price of fame. "Come Back Down" is the album's second single, released on July 9, 2013. Its music video premiered on July 12, 2013 and features Fernandes and his love interest's relationship deteriorating due to substance abuse and domestic violence. "Come Back Down" so far peaked at number 42 on the Canadian Hot 100.

== Track listing ==
Track	Title	Length
01	"Overdose"	3:54
02	"Breathe Again"	3:39
03	"Come Back Down"	3:06
04	"Emotional"	4:06
05	"Fly Again (Broken Wings)"	3:40
06	"Kryptonite"	3:23
07	"Love Letter"	3:31
08	"End of the World"	3:28
09	"Fkn Lie"	3:40
10	"Hurt No More"	4:24
11	"Ran Away"	4:09
12	"She Won't Leave"	1:52
13	"Unpredictable" (Bonus Track)	3:24
