= Fantasy (Danny Fernandes song) =

Single by Danny Fernandes

from the album Intro
- Released: November 4, 2008
- Recorded: 2008
- Genre: Pop; R&B
- Length: 3:53
- Label: Capital Prophets (CP) Records Inc.
- Songwriters: Ahmad Balshe; Jason Quenneville; Danny Fernandes

Danny Fernandes singles chronology
"Private Dancer" (2008)	"Fantasy" (2008)	"Never Again" (2009)

Fantasy is the third single by R&B singer Danny Fernandes. It's the fourth track off his debut album Intro.

== Music video ==
The music video first premiered on the MOD Daily Ten countdown on Much On Demand. It starts off with Fernandes sitting on a chair singing and looking at the camera, and later it shows a girl who just stands still in the middle of a hallway and thinks about her and Fernandes going on trips and spending time together. In the end part her and Fernandes are both in a bubble bath together, and the girl stops daydreaming after she was bumped into by another girl walking past her. Girlicious makes a cameo where they lip sync the hook "What's your fantasy". Danny's brother, Shawn Desman, also makes an appearance in the beginning of the music video. The whole entire video was choreographed by hip-hop choreographer Luther Brown, who's also one of the judges from So You Think You Can Dance Canada. The music video received a lot of commercial success as it also reached #1 on the Much Music Countdown

== Chart performance ==
The song debuted at number 68 on the Canadian Hot 100 on the week of December 6, 2008. The song reached a new peak at number 25 on the week of February 14, 2009.

Chart (2008–09)	Peak position
Canada CHR/Top 40 (Billboard)	9
Canada (Canadian Hot 100)	25

== Certification ==
Region	Certification	Certified units/sales
Canada (Music Canada)	Gold	20,000^{*}
^{*} Sales figures based on certification alone.
