= Fly Again (Broken Wings) =

Single by Danny Fernandes

from the album Breathe Again
- Released: February 22, 2013 (iTunes)
- Recorded: 2012
- Genre: Pop, R&B
- Length: 3:42
- Label: CP Records
- Songwriter(s): Danny Fernandes, GoodWill & MGI, Roderick Kerr, Brian Ellis, Richard Page, Steve George, John Lang
- Producer(s): GoodWill & MGI

Danny Fernandes singles chronology
"Hit Me Up" (2011)	"Fly Again (Broken Wings)" (2013)	"Come Back Down" (2013)

"Fly Again (Broken Wings)" is a single by Canadian recording artist Danny Fernandes, released as a digital download on February 22, 2013. It serves as the first single from his third studio album Breathe Again. It is a pop and R&B midtempo ballad, with a chorus that heavily samples the 1985 hit "Broken Wings" by Mr. Mister. The single failed to chart on the Canadian Hot 100.

== Background and inspiration ==
The song was inspired by Fernandes' increasing fame and the pressures he faced due to it, which led to his breakup with his former fiancée. In an interview with Samaritanmag.com, Fernandes explained the song's message: "With this new single, and much of my new record, I really wanted to show people that celebrity life isn’t all about glamour and money and cars. It can ruin someone’s life. When you are in a position like I am, things are given to you very easily, like going to clubs where they give you alcohol and women are hanging out. It’s easy to get caught up in these things. I got used to it and took advantage of situations."

With regards to the song's sample of "Broken Wings", Fernandes revealed: "I was in the studio and I had a bunch of producers playing me some records. They actually played me the "Fly Again" song but the chorus was already there. I was like, ‘I know this song’ and they were like, ‘Yeah it’s Mr. Mister.’ So I just said, ‘I’m taking it.’ It was one of those things you hear and just know is a definite hit. So I wrote the rest of it and that’s what came out of it."

== Music video ==
The song's music video was directed by Marc Andre Debruyne and released on March 23, 2013. It features Fernandes and his love interest having severe relationship troubles, while their private lives are being exposed to the paparazzi. Later, Fernandes becomes aggressive towards the paparazzi. The video was inspired by Fernandes' own struggles with fame's pressure on his friends and relationships. Filming took place in Chicago, Illinois.

== Charts ==
=== Weekly charts ===
Chart (2013)	Peak position
Canada CHR/Top 40 (Billboard)	36
