= Danny Fernandes =

Canadian singer and songwriter (born 1985)

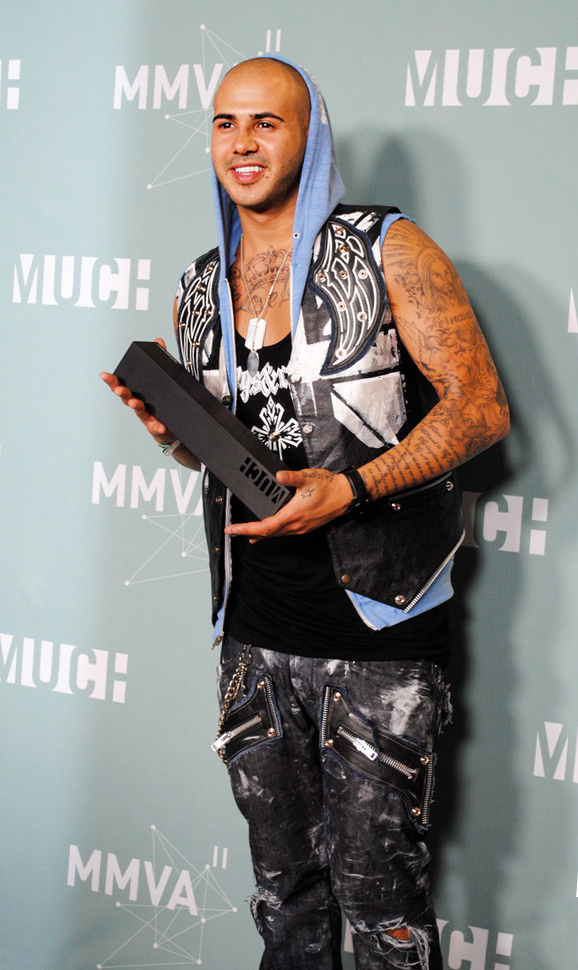
- Fernandes at the 2011 MuchMusic Video Awards

Background information
- Born: September 16, 1985 (age 40); Toronto, Ontario, Canada
- Genres: R&B; hip hop; crunk
- Occupations: Singer; songwriter; dancer; choreographer; television personality
- Years active: 1997–present
- Label: CP
- Partner: Alessandra Lamacchia (2025-Present)
- Website: dannyfernandes.com

Daniel "Danny" Fernandes (born September 16, 1985) is a Canadian singer and songwriter.

== Early life ==
Danny Fernandes is of Portuguese descent. He has a younger brother named Jonathan, and his older brother is Shawn Desman. He also is a cousin to singer Tyler Medeiros, who signed to Danny's former record label CP Records.

At 16, Fernandes won two consecutive Rising Star awards in the annual CNE dance contest held at Cherrytree Public School located in Brampton, Ontario, near Toronto. He became the youngest member of the Toronto Raptors' famed Dance Pak and began to appear regularly as a backup dancer in music videos.

== Career ==
=== 2003–2008: Early beginnings and Intro ===
After graduating from high school, Danny started playing showcases at clubs in Europe (Germany, Switzerland, and Austria), Fernandes signed with the Canadian CP Records (Capital Prophet Records) and released his debut album Intro. Danny went out on tour across Canada as the opening act for Akon and Sean Kingston.

On October 14, 2008, CP Records released "Curious", featuring Juelz Santana, the first of four singles from Intro. "Curious" was followed by "Private Dancer", featuring Belly; "Never Again"; and "Fantasy", the most successful of the four, peaking at Number 25 on the Canadian Hot 100 and spending 14 weeks on Canadian radio.

Fernandes was also a judge on the TV show Karaoke Star Jr. alongside Tara Oram.

=== 2010–2013: AutomaticLUV ===
Fernandes's second album, AutomaticLUV, was released by CP Records on November 2, 2010, with the first single called "Automatic" featuring Belly. The second single off the album was called "Take Me Away" and the third "Hit Me Up" which once again featured Belly and Josh Ramsay from the Canadian band Marianas Trench. The single reached Number 22 on the Billboard Canadian Hot 100 charts and the video single reached Number 1 on the MuchMusic Countdown.

=== 2013–present: Breathe Again and continued work ===
He released his third studio album, Breathe Again on August 27, 2013 on CP Records. The album was preceded by the singles "Fly Again (Broken Wings)" and "Come Back Down" the video single reached No. 1 on the MuchMusic Countdown.

Since the release of his third album, Fernandes has still continued to work on new music. In 2015, he released a single called "Gogo" featuring Kevin McCall. In 2016, he released a collaborative single with Tom-E called "Dear Life" featuring iSH. The single was certified Gold by Music Canada.

== Personal life ==
Since at least 2016, he has been engaged to Jenn Joyce. The couple welcomed their first child together, a daughter, in September 2016, with her godparents being Shawn and his wife.

The singer has battled with drug addiction. In 2023, it was reported that several aspiring singers accused Fernandes of scamming them out of hundreds of thousands of dollars while making empty promises to assist them with their music careers. In an email to CBC News, Fernandes attributed his behaviour to drug use.

== Accolades ==
- At the 2009 MuchMusic Video Awards on June 21, 2009, Danny Fernandes won the Best Canadian Pop Video of the Year for Private Dancer directed by Ren, produced by Renaud Stanton Dupré through The Field Inc. production company.
- In April–May 2009, he had also been nominated to People's Choice: Favourite New Canadian Artist/Group category and his single "Fantasy" was nominated for People's Choice: Favourite Canadian Video category in the vote leading to 2009 MuchMusic Video Awards.
- He was nominated for a Juno at the 2010 Juno Awards in the Best New Canadian Artist category.
- In 2010 he won Favourite Pop Canadian Artist at the Canadian Indie Awards.
- In 2011 Mike Portoghese – Post-Production/Director, along with Producer: Bruce Carson, Rory Halsall, and Production Company: The NE Inc., won "Best Post Production of the Year" at the MMVA's for Automatic
- In 2012 Marc André Debruyne – Director, along with Production Company: The NE Inc., won "Director of the Year" at the MMVA's for Hit Me Up feat. Josh Ramsay & Belly

== Discography ==
=== Studio albums ===
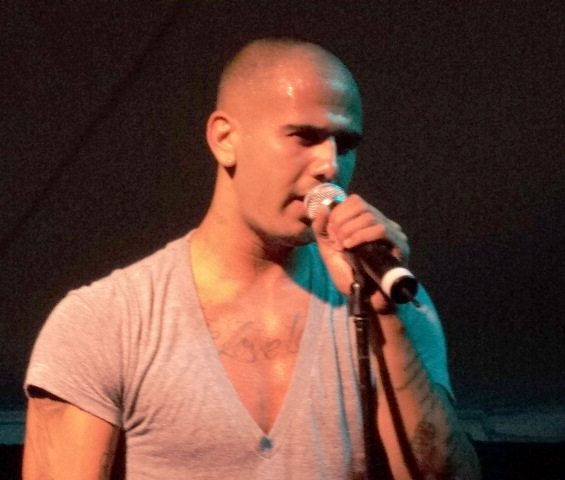
Danny Fernandes performing in a festival in Laval, Quebec, Canada

Title	Album details	Canada
Intro	Released: October 14, 2008; Label: CP Records; Format: CD	55
AutomaticLUV	Released: November 2, 2010; Label: CP Records; Format: CD, iTunes	61
Breathe Again	Released: August 27, 2013; Label: CP Records; Format: CD, iTunes	—

=== Singles ===
Title	Year	Peak chart positions			Certifications	Album
Title	Year	CAN	CAN CHR	CAN HAC	Certifications	Album
"Curious" (featuring Juelz Santana)	2008	65	18	—		Intro
"Private Dancer" (featuring Belly)	2008	32	11	—	MC: Gold	Intro
"Fantasy"	2008	25	9	17	MC: Gold	Intro
"Never Again"	2009	44	18	19		Intro
"Addicted"	2009	49	22	40		Intro
"Automatic" (featuring Belly)	2010	41	20	36		AutomaticLUV
"Take Me Away"	2011	39	23	27		AutomaticLUV
"Feel It" (featuring Shawn Desman)	2011	—	49	—		AutomaticLUV
"Hit Me Up" (featuring Josh Ramsay and Belly)	2011	22	13	22	MC: Platinum	AutomaticLUV
"Fly Again (Broken Wings)"	2013	—	36	48		Breathe Again
"Come Back Down"	2013	42	19	30		Breathe Again
"Emotional"	2013	—	—	—		Breathe Again
"Gogo" (featuring Kevin McCall)	2015	—	—	—		Non-album singles
"Dear Life" (with Tom-E featuring iSH)	2016	—	—	—	MC: Gold	Non-album singles
"Missing"	2018	—	—	43		Non-album singles
"No Tomorrow" (featuring DU5T1)	2019	—	—	—		Non-album singles
"Sinking"	2019	—	—	—		Non-album singles
"Please Don't Break My Heart"	2019	—	—	—		Non-album singles
"Learn from You" (with Jyay and Net 30)	2019	—	—	—		Non-album singles
"Let Me Down Easy" (with DU5T1)	2020	—	—	—		Non-album singles
"You and I" (with Black Creek Reign)	2021	—	—	—		Non-album singles

=== Featured singles ===
Title	Year	Peak chart positions	Album
Title	Year	CAN	Album
"Passenger" (DY featuring Danny Fernandes)	2009	—	Non-album single
"Girlfriend" (Tyler Medeiros featuring Danny Fernandes)	2010	90	TM
"Treat U Right" (JRDN featuring Danny Fernandes)	2011	—	Non-album single
"Turn It Up" (Mia Martina featuring Belly and Danny Fernandes)	2011	—	Devotion
"I Can Be Your Ride" (Big Lean featuring Danny Fernandes)	2012	—	Non-album singles
"On A Roll" (Jigz Crillz featuring Danny Fernandes)	2013	—	Non-album singles

== Tours ==
Headlining

- Fantasy Tour (2009)
- AutomaticLuv Tour with JRDN (2010_
- Dear Life Asia Tour (2016)

Supporting

- Girlicious – The Girlicious Tour (2008)
- Emily Osment – SodaPOP (2010)
