= Never Again (Danny Fernandes song) =

Single by Danny Fernandes

from the album Intro
- Released: June 2009
- Recorded: 2008
- Genre: Pop, R&B
- Length: 3:56
- Label: Capital Prophets (CP) Records Inc.
- Songwriters: Danny Fernandes, Ahmad Balshe, Alexander Vujic
- Producer: Pilzbury

Danny Fernandes singles chronology
"Fantasy" (2008)	"Never Again" (2009)	"Addicted" (2009)

"Never Again" is the fourth single by R&B singer Danny Fernandes. It is also the sixth track on the album Intro.

== Chart performance ==
The song debuted at number 95 on the Canadian Hot 100 on the week of June 18, 2009 and peaked at number 44 six weeks later. It would stay on the chart for a total of fifteen weeks.

Chart (2009)	Peak position
Canada CHR/Top 40 (Billboard)	18
Canada Hot 100 (Billboard)	44

== Music video ==
The music video was directed by RT! and was shot in Prague, Czech Republic.
