= Hot Show =

1999 studio album by Prozzäk

Studio album by Prozzäk
- Released: November 2, 1998 (Canada); August 17, 1999 (United States)
- Recorded: 1998
- Genres: Pop; pop rock
- Length: 48:59
- Label: Epic
- Producers: Jeff Dalziel; James McCollum; Jason Levine; Lenny DeRose

Prozzäk chronology
Hot Show (1998)	Saturday People (2000)

Singles from Hot Show
- 1. "Omobolasire" Released: 1998; 2. "Sucks to Be You" Released: 1999; 3. "Strange Disease" Released: 1999; 4. "Europa" Released: 1999; 5. "New York" Released: 2000

Professional ratings
Review scores
Source	Rating
Allmusic	3/5 stars

Hot Show is the debut studio album by Canadian pop duo Prozzäk. It was released through Epic Records on 2 November 1998 in Canada, and 17 August 1999 in the United States.

The album was very successful in Canada, being certified Triple Platinum in the country. Hot Show was also nominated for "Best Album" at the 2000 Juno Awards, while "Sucks to Be You" was nominated for "Best Single", and "Strange Disease" for "Best Video". Between 1996 and 2016, Hot Show was among the top 60 best-selling albums by Canadian artists in Canada.

== Track listing ==
1. "Intro" – 0:08
2. "Europa" – 3:30
3. "Strange Disease" – 3:26
4. "Omobolasire" – 3:41
5. "Shag Tag (You're It!)" – 3:59
6. "Hot Show" – 4:08
7. "Mediterranean Lady" – 4:05
8. "Wild Thing-Poor Boy (Medley)" – 2:49
9. "Sucks to Be You" – 3:21
10. "New York" – 4:07
11. "I Like to Watch (Milo's Night Out)" – 3:01
12. "Tsunami" – 3:46
13. "Sleep with Myself" – 3:55
14. "Anna-Lisa" – 3:56
15. "Simon's Final Thought" – 1:15

== Personnel ==
- Jason Levine – vocals, bass, string arrangements, producer
- James McCollum – guitar, string arrangements, producer
- Jon Levine – wurlitzer
- Jeff Dalziel – drums, percussion
- Stephan Moccio – piano, keyboards
- Lenny DeRose – mixing, engineer, producer
- Jeff Dalziel – engineer, producer
- Kenny Moran – assistant engineer
- Blair Robb – programming
- P. Letros – mastering
- Amber Meredith – editing
- Tanya Nagowski – production coordination
- Chris Frazer Smith – management
- Mike Roth – A&R
- Scott Harder – illustrations

== Year-end charts ==
Chart (2000)	Position
Canadian Albums (Nielsen SoundScan)	172

== Release history ==
Region	Date
Canada	November 2, 1998
United States	August 17, 1999
