= Curious (Danny Fernandes song) =

Single by Danny Fernandes featuring Juelz Santana

from the album Intro
- Released: January 2008
- Recorded: 2007
- Genre: Pop, R&B
- Length: 2:34
- Label: Capital Prophets (CP) Records Inc.
- Songwriters: Danny Fernandes, Alexander Vujic
- Producer: Pilzbury

Danny Fernandes singles chronology
"Curious" (2008)	"Private Dancer" (2008)

Juelz Santana singles chronology
"Emotionless" (2008)	"Curious" (2008)	"There's Nothin (Remix)" (2008)

Music video
- "Curious" on YouTube

"Curious" is the first single by Canadian R&B singer Danny Fernandes. The song features American rapper Juelz Santana and was produced by Pilzbury. It appears on Fernandes' first album, Intro.

== Music video ==
The music video starts with medium shots of Fernandes and Santana, and when the music starts Fernandes and some other dancers start dancing, and there are some scenes of women posing for the camera.

== Chart performance ==
The song debuted at number 94 on the Canadian Hot 100 on the issue of February 2, 2008 and rose a further nine spots before leaving the chart. Two months later on the issue of April 19, 2008 it re-entered the chart, peaking higher at number 65.

Chart (2008)	Peak position
Canada CHR/Top 40 (Billboard)	18
Canada (Canadian Hot 100)	65
