= Nicole Henry =

American jazz singer

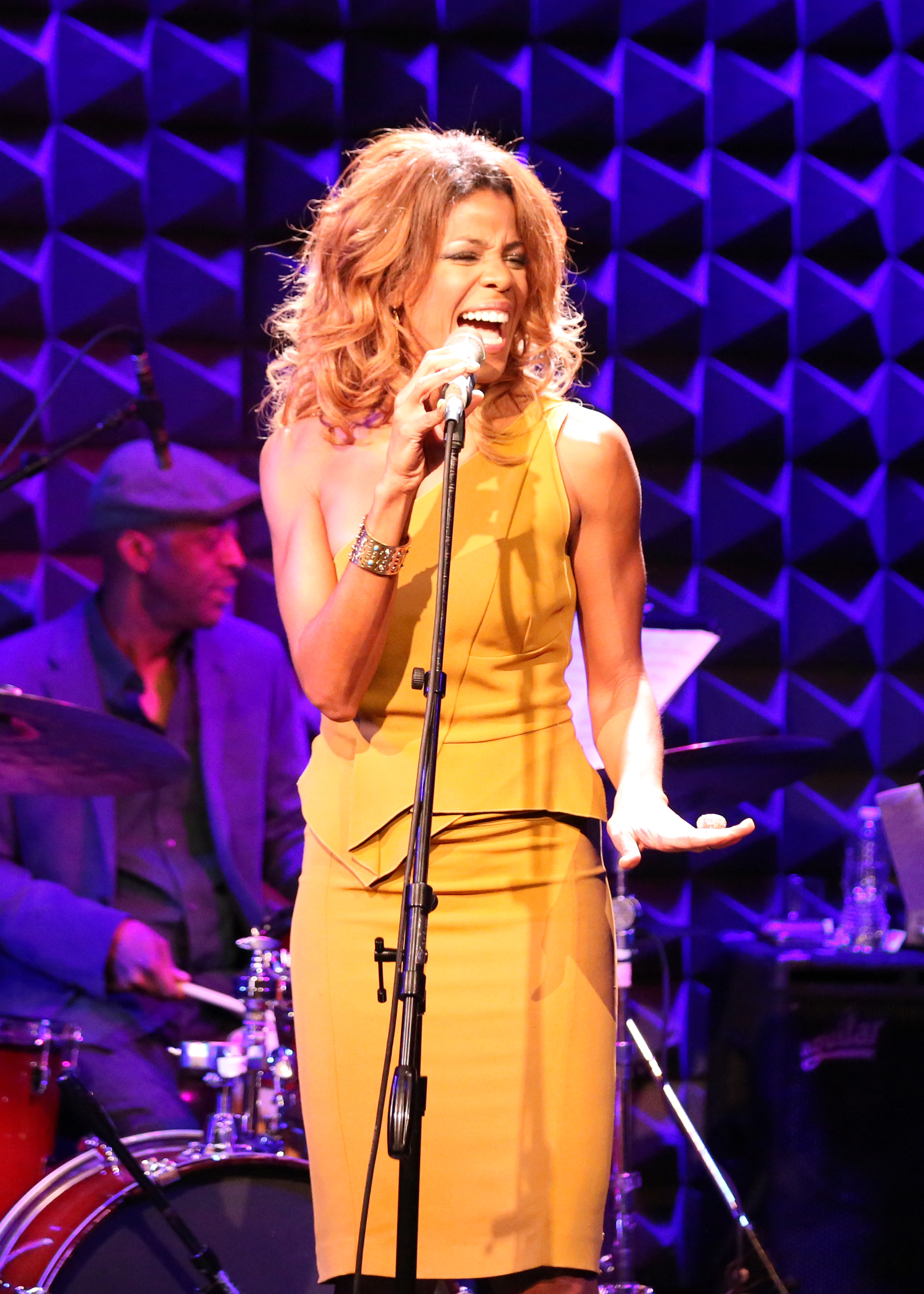
- Nicole Henry at Joes's Pub in New York City

Background information
- Born: Philadelphia, Pennsylvania, United States
- Genres: Vocal jazz; Soul
- Occupations: Recording Artist, Performer
- Years active: 2004–present
- Labels: Banister, Venus
- Website: www.nicolehenry.com

Nicole Henry is an American jazz vocalist, actress, and recording artist. Known for her dynamic live performances and interpretations of jazz standards, soul, blues, originals and contemporary music, she has released multiple recordings that topped the charts in the U.S. and Japan, toured internationally, and appeared in theater productions and symphonic performances.

Since making her debut CD release in 2004, Henry has received the Soul Train Music Award for Best Traditional Jazz Performance, earning a place on five TOP 10 national charts. She has performed in more than 20 countries and collaborated with musicians including Kirk Whalum, Gerald Clayton, Gil Goldstein, Julian Lage, and more.

== Personal life ==
Nicole Henry was born in Philadelphia, Pennsylvania, and raised in Andalusia, a community in Bensalem Township, Bucks County.

Growing up in a musical family, Henry participated in school and church choirs, as well as studying both cello and ballet from an early age. Although she studied music and dance as a child, she initially planned to pursue a career outside of music. She attended the University of Miami, where she originally received a full academic scholarship to study architecture. She eventually earned a bachelor’s degree in Advertising Communications and Theater.

Following graduation, Henry worked as an actress, appearing in national television commercials and voice-over roles before turning her attention to music full-time.

== Career ==
In 2000, Henry toured as a background singer for Robert Bradley's Blackwater Surprise, performing blues/rock music. In the late 1990s, she also lent her voice to two dance music recordings written by Noel W. Sanger. One song, "Miracle," reached #8 on the Billboard Dance Music Chart in 1998. She discovered jazz while singing in Miami Beach when her then bassist, Paul Shewchuk, invited her to learn some jazz standards to perform with his trio. The Miami New Times named Henry “Best Solo Musician 2002”.

In 2004, Henry released her debut CD, The Nearness of You, on Banister Records. The album earned Henry the "Best New Jazz Artist" award by HMV Japan.

The following year, Henry's Teach Me Tonight reached #1 in Japan and was named HMV Japan's Best Vocal Jazz Album of 2005.

Her 2008 album The Very Thought of You reached #7 on Billboard's jazz chart. On this third studio album, she worked with contemporary songwriters like K. J. Denhert (I Found You), and James Bryan McCollum, with whom she co-wrote "All That I Can See."

Her 2011 release Embraceable reached Top 20 on U.S. Jazz and Smooth Jazz Radio Charts and featured Kirk Whalum, Gerald Clayton, John Stoddart, Julian Lage, Gil Goldstein, Larry Gernadier and Eric Harland among others.

In 2012, she made her San Francisco debut at The Razz Room.

In 2013, she sang new renditions of hits from the 1970s on her album So Good, So Right: Nicole Henry Live recorded in front of crowds at Feinstein's in New York City.

In 2013, Henry received the "Soul Train Award" for "Best Traditional Jazz Performance" after competing with George Benson, Jeffrey Osborne, Chaka Khan, Tony Bennett, Marc Anthony and Terrence Blanchard.

In a 2014 interview with CBS Miami, she cited Dinah Washington and Sarah Vaughan as sources of inspiration.

In 2015, Henry released her seventh CD, titled Summer Sessions, an eight-song acoustic EP with both covers and originals, accompanied by James Bryan.

Henry was invited to sing the National Anthem at the Orange Bowl in both 2010 and 2018.

In 2019, she returned to the theatrical stage and garnered critical praise for her portrayal of Nikki Marron in “The Bodyguard," a new musical based on the smash hit 1992 film. In late 2020, she will perform in the new musical “A Wonderful World,” the story of Louis Armstrong, debuting at the Colony Theatre in Miami Beach, FL.

Henry is currently in the studio working on her eighth album which is slated to be released in late 2020.

== Discography ==
Lead Artist

Title	Year	Label	Peak Chart Position
The Nearness of You	2004	Banister	#2 Vocal Jazz Album 2004- HMV Japan; #27 on U.S. JazzWeek Radio Chart
Teach Me Tonight	2005	Venus	#1 Vocal Jazz Album & #2 Jazz Album 2005 HMV Japan Sales Chart
The Very Thought of You	2008	Banister	#7 Billboard Top Jazz Album, 2008
Embraceable	2011	ArtistShare	Top 20 JazzWeek Radio Chart; TOP 20 Smooth Jazz Radio Chart for 14 weeks
Set for the Season	2011	Banister	
So Good, So Right	2013	Banister	#16 Billboard Traditional Jazz Album, Feb 2013; #19 Smooth Jazz Billboard Chart
Time to Love Again	2021	Banister	#4 JazzWeek Radio Chart; #4 UK Soul Chart;#6 UK Sweet Rhythms chart; #4 U.S. Indie Soul Chart

Singles & EP

Title	Year	Label
I Found Love (DaMooch-colab)	1998	SFP/Essential Media Group
Moon River	2018	Banister
Angels We Have Heard on High	2019	Banister
Feeling Good	2021	ArtistShare
Your Smiling Face	2021	Banister
Midnight at the Oasis	2022	Banister
For the Love of You	2022	Foliage Records
Is It a Crime?	2023	Banister
My Favorite Things	2024	Banister
Everything Is Fine	2026	Banister

== Acting credits ==
Year	Production	Role	Venue
2019	The Bodyguard	Nicki Marron	North Shore Music Theater (Boston)
2021	A Wonderful World	Alpha Smith	Colony Theatre (Miami Beach) - World Premier
2022	Smokey Joe’s Cafe	Brenda	North Shore Music Theater (Boston)
2023	The Color Purple	Shug Avery	Martin Marietta Center for the Performing Arts North Carolina Theater Company(Raleigh)
2026	Black II Broadway	Shug Avery (from The Color Purple)	Gray Box Theater (Wilton Manors)

== Awards and honors ==
Year	Awards	Category	Work
2002	Miami New Times	Best Local Solo Musician	From actress to established vocalist
2005	HMV Japan Award	Best New Jazz Artist	Acclaimed debut album, The Nearness of You
2013	Soul Train Music Award	Best Traditional Jazz Performance	For her rendition of "Waiting in Vain"
2016 & 2024	Miami Proclamation	Nicole Henry Days	artistic and philanthropic work
2011 & 2017	Miami Beach Proclamation	Nicole Henry Days	artistic and philanthropic work
2021	BroadwayWorld Miami	Vocalist of the Decade	To honor her sustained excellence, powerful vocal talent, and jazz scene over ten years
