= AutomaticLUV =

Studio album by Danny Fernandes
- Released: November 2, 2010 (Canada)
- Recorded: 2010
- Genres: Pop, R&B, soul
- Length: 48:19
- Label: Capital Prophets (CP) Records Inc.
- Producers: Belly (exec.); Beat Merchant, Shawn Desman, Jason "DaHeala" Quenneville, Whosane?, RyanDan, Lynx, Julian "J Gramm" Gramma, Benny Benassi

Danny Fernandes chronology
Intro (2008)	AutomaticLUV (2010)	Breathe Again (2013)

Singles from AutomaticLUV
- 1. "Automatic" Released: August 31, 2010; 2. "Take Me Away" Released: February 2011; 3. "Feel It" Released: April 2011; 4. "Hit Me Up" Released: October 2011

AutomaticLUV is the second studio album by Danny Fernandes. The album features the single, "Automatic" which peaked at #41 on the Canadian Hot 100. It was released on November 2, 2010. The second single "Take Me Away" is peaked at #39 on the Canadian Hot 100.

== Track listing ==
#	Song title	Time
01	"Automatic" (feat. Belly)	3:10
02	"Hey Stranger"	3:12
03	"Take Me Away"	3:25
04	"Watch Me Watch U"	2:55
05	"Hit Me Up" (feat. Josh Ramsay & Belly)	3:14
06	"Where U From"	3:15
07	"So Easy to Love You"	3:10
08	"All Over Your Body (feat. Belly)	2:43
09	"More Than Friends"	3:41
10	"Here We Go..."	3:10
11	"Feel It" (feat. Shawn Desman)	3:21
12	"Dream Catcher" (feat. Mia Martina)	3:12
13	"Let's Make a Movie"	2:57
14	"Take Me Away (Benny Benassi Remix)"	5:46
15	"Automatic (Stevie Deez Remix)" (iTunes Bonus Track)	3:48

== Chart positions ==
Chart (2010)	Peak position
Canadian Albums Chart	61
