= Private Dancer (Danny Fernandes song) =

Single by Danny Fernandes featuring Belly

from the album Intro
- Released: July 2008
- Recorded: 2008
- Genre: Electropop, R&B
- Length: 3:24
- Label: Capital Prophets (CP) Records Inc.
- Songwriters: Ahmad "Belly" Balshe, Jason Quenneville, Danny Fernandes
- Producer: Shawn Desman

Danny Fernandes singles chronology
"Curious" (2008)	"Private Dancer" (2008)	"Fantasy" (2008)

Belly singles chronology
"Ridin'" (2007)	"Private Dancer" (2008)	"Amnesia" (2009)

"Private Dancer" is the second single by R&B singer Danny Fernandes. It was written by Belly, Danny Fernandes, and David Evering. It is also the second track off his debut album Intro.

== Music video ==
The music video has Danny Fernandes singing in a club. He said it was about a Toronto Dance club and about the girls. Belly is currently singing at the very end with him. The music video shot at #1 on the MuchMusic Countdown. It also won the Best Pop Video of the Year award at the 2009 MuchMusic Video Awards.

== Chart performance ==
The song debuted at number 81 on the Canadian Hot 100 and went on to peak at number 32, staying there for two weeks. It stayed on the chart for a total of twenty weeks.

Chart (2008)	Peak position
Canada CHR/Top 40 (Billboard)	11
Canada (Canadian Hot 100)	32

== Certification ==
Region	Certification	Certified units/sales
Canada (Music Canada)	Gold	20,000^{*}
^{*} Sales figures based on certification alone.
