= Hit Me Up (Danny Fernandes song) =

Single by Danny Fernandes featuring Josh Ramsay and Belly

from the album AutomaticLUV
- Released: October 2011 (Radio); December 13, 2011 (iTunes)
- Recorded: 2010
- Genre: Pop, hip hop
- Length: 3:14
- Label: CP Records / Fontana North / Universal Music
- Songwriters: Ahmad Balshe, Danny Fernandez, Josh Ramsay, Tony Sal

Danny Fernandes singles chronology
"Feel It" (2010)	"Hit Me Up" (2011)	"Fly Again (Broken Wings)" (2013)

Josh Ramsay singles chronology
"Hush" (2011)	"Hit Me Up" (2011)

Belly singles chronology
"Automatic" (2010)	"Hit Me Up" (2011)	"I Drink I Smoke" (2011)

"Hit Me Up" is a song by Canadian singer Danny Fernandes. The song features Josh Ramsay, lead vocalist for pop punk band Marianas Trench and rapper Belly. It was the fourth single released from his second album AutomaticLUV. The song was released in October 2011 on radio and was later released on iTunes on December 13, 2011.

== Music video ==
A music video was released for the single and was directed by Marc André Debruyne. Production was done by The Next Element, executive produced by John Nadalin and RT!, Vimla Mangru as production designer and director of photography was Samy Inayeh. The video features cameos from fellow CP Records artists Massari and Tyler Medeiros.

The video starts with Danny and Massari in an Aston Martin driving on a private road at night where Danny receives and on-screen message saying "Keep the Key safe. Information priceless". He speeds up after reading the message and reaches a mansion through a garage that acts as an elevator for the car leading to the basement that's having a party filled with people hanging out by the pool table, swimming pool and bar. Josh notices Danny and speaks with his accomplice (played by MTV's Aliya Jasmine Sovani) to retrieve the key from Danny. After being escorted to Danny, the accomplice begins to seduce Danny by leading him to bed and slips a drug into Danny's drink that knocks him out and allows her to steal the key around his neck. The accomplice goes to Josh by the pool to give him the key, only to betray him by having Belly appear behind him and take him away with Josh acting out in anger over the betrayal. It cuts to early morning with Danny and a bloody and bruised Josh tied up near a rock cliffside with Belly and the accomplice sending them off to sea by pushing two cinderblocks attached to them off the cliff before cutting to black.

== Chart performance ==
The song debuted at number 97 on the week of November 25, 2011. It later reached a new peak at number 22 and would go on and spend an additional thirteen weeks on the chart.

=== Weekly charts ===
Chart (2011–2012)	Peak position
Canada CHR/Top 40 (Billboard)	13
Canada (Canadian Hot 100)	22

=== Year-end charts ===
Chart (2012)	Position
Canada (Canadian Hot 100)	65

== Certifications ==
Region	Certification	Certified units/sales
Canada (Music Canada)	Platinum	80,000^{*}
^{*} Sales figures based on certification alone.
