= Intro (Danny Fernandes album) =

Studio album by Danny Fernandes
- Released: October 14, 2008 (Canada)
- Recorded: 2007–2008
- Genre: Pop, R&B
- Label: Capital Prophets (CP) Records Inc.
- Producer: Belly (exec.); Beat Merchant, Pilzbury, Shawn Desman, Jason "DaHeala" Quenneville, Whosane?

Danny Fernandes chronology
Intro (2008)	AutomaticLUV (2010)

Singles from Intro
- 1. "Curious" Released: January 2008; 2. "Private Dancer" Released: July 2008; 3. "Fantasy" Released: November 2008; 4. "Never Again" Released: June 2009; 5. "Addicted" Released: October 2009

Intro is the debut album of pop singer Danny Fernandes. It was co-written and co-produced by rapper Belly. The album features the hit singles "Curious" (featuring Juelz Santana), "Private Dancer (featuring Belly)," "Fantasy", "Never Again", and "Addicted". It was released on October 14, 2008 in Canada.

== Track listing ==
#	Song title	Time
01	"Had Me At Hi"	3:41
02	"Private Dancer" (feat. Belly)	3:24
03	"Missed Call"	3:41
04	"Fantasy"	3:53
05	"Addicted"	3:56
06	"Never Again"	3:56
07	"Nonchalant" (feat. Belly & Mia Martina)	3:36
08	"Memory"	3:38
09	"Curious"	2:34
10	"Number Changed"	3:14
11	"Time"	3:54
12	"Not At All"	3:28
13	"Nobody"	3:41

== Chart positions ==
Chart (2008)	Peak position
Canadian Albums Chart	55
