= Addicted (Danny Fernandes song) =

Single by Danny Fernandes

from the album Intro
- Released: October 2009
- Recorded: 2008
- Genre: Pop, R&B
- Length: 3:56
- Label: Capital Prophets (CP) Records Inc.
- Songwriters: Ahmad Balshe, Alex Gordon

Danny Fernandes singles chronology
"Never Again" (2009)	"Addicted" (2009)	"Automatic" (2010)

Music video
- "Addicted" on YouTube

"Addicted" is a song by R&B singer Danny Fernandes. It's the fifth track and single off his debut album Intro.

== Chart performance ==
It was released in October 2009 and entered the Canadian Hot 100 on the week of November 14, 2009 peaking at number 49 on the chart. It stayed a total of 12 weeks in the charts until January 30, 2010.

Chart (2009–10)	Peak Position
Canada CHR/Top 40 (Billboard)	22
Canada (Canadian Hot 100)	49
