= Tyler Medeiros =

Canadian singer (born 1995)

- Born: July 11, 1995 (age 31); Toronto, Ontario, Canada
- Genre: Pop
- Instrument: Vocals
- Years active: 2010–present
- Labels: CP Records, International Music Group

Tyler Medeiros (born July 11, 1995) is a Canadian singer, songwriter, and dancer.

== Personal life ==
Medeiros was born and raised in Toronto, Ontario, to a Portuguese father and an Italian mother. He attended St. Anthony's Catholic Elementary School in Toronto from Junior Kindergarten until he graduated grade 8 in 2009. Medeiros is also known as the cousin of singers Shawn Desman and Danny Fernandes. In 2012, he was signed by Flo Rida and embarked on a Canadian tour alongside Victoria Duffield, Cody Simpson, and Big Time Rush.

Medeiros began taking dancing lessons at the age of ten and signed with CP Records in 2010. Currently, he occasionally resides in Los Angeles to further his career.

== Musical career ==
Medeiros' first single was "Girlfriend" featuring labelmate and cousin Danny Fernandes. The video premiered on Family Channel and also MuchMusic. It was followed up with his second single "Say I Love You (Please Don't Go)" that features rapper Lil Twist sampling on a KC and the Sunshine Band song. Both videos were directed by Marc André Debruyne. Medeiros also appeared on the cover of July–August 2011 issue of the Canadian teen magazine Vervegirl. Tyler was chosen my Family Channel to sing and perform the theme song to their 2011 Bullying Awareness Week Stand Up! campaign. The song, called "What's Up, Stand Up," was written by RyanDan members Ryan Kowarsky and Dan Kowarsky as well as Maks Gabriel. The video premiered on the Family Channel on November 15, 2011.

In 2012 Medeiros signed with Flo Rida's IMG Label in a joint project with CP Records. Shortly after the signing, he joined Flo Rida and Pitbull for the Planet Pit Tour across Canada. On June 1, 2012, it was announced that Medeiros would be a main performer at the Big Ticket Summer Concert put on by Family Channel on August 26 along with Bridgit Mendler, R5, Veronica and Allstar Weekend. In June 2012 it was also announced that Tyler would join Big Time Rush and Cody Simpson on a cross Canada tour in September. September 4, the tour kick off in Montreal coincided with Medeiros release of TM – his debut EP.

The first song off TM was "#QTEEs" and the second was "Radio" ft. Flo Rida.

== Discography ==
=== Extended play ===
- 2012: TM

=== Singles ===
Year	Title	Peak	Album
Year	Title	CAN	Album
2010	"Girlfriend" (feat. Danny Fernandes)	90	TM
2011	"Say I Love You (Please Don't Go)" (feat. Lil Twist)	88	TM
2011	"What's Up Stand Up"	—	TM
2012	"#QTEEs"	—	TM
2012	"Radio" (feat. Flo Rida)	—	TM

== Videography ==
- 2010: "Girlfriend" (feat. Danny Fernandes)
- 2011: "Say I Love You (Please Don't Go)" (feat. Lil Twist)
