= Get Down (B4-4 song) =

2000 single by B4-4 song

Single by b4-4

from the album B4-4
- Released: May 2000
- Genre: Pop
- Length: 3:44
- Label: Columbia
- Songwriters: Jason Levine; James McCollum
- Producers: Jason Levine; James McCollum

B4-4 singles chronology
| "Get Down" (2000) | "Go Go" (2000) |

Music video
- "Get Down" on YouTube

"Get Down" is the debut single by Canadian boy band b4-4. It was released in May 2000 as the first single from their debut self-titled album. The song was very successful in Canada, peaking at number 4 on Canada's Singles Chart. The song was written and produced by Jason Levine and James McCollum, who were nominated for "Best Producer" at the 2001 Juno Awards for their work on the track. The song was featured on the compilation album MuchDance 2001.

== Content ==
Since its release, the song has become infamous for its suggestive lyrics, which are thinly veiled references to oral sex. Ed the Sock, a MuchMusic denizen, castigated the song as a "sugar-coated fellatio fest".

In a 2013 interview with Vice, Ryan and Dan Kowarsky stated that "the song is about sex. The song is about oral sex, obviously" and expressed regret for not mentioning it earlier. They stated that were instructed by the record company not to mention that the song was about sex in interviews, opting instead for an explanation that it was about "the give and take in a relationship".

== Music video ==
The music video begins with a young boy walking and seeing a homeless man on the street, who asks for money. The boy has no money and continues walking until he stumbles upon a View-Master stereoscope left in the garbage. After looking through the lens of the stereoscope, he gains popularity and wealth as b4-4 dance and sing. At the end, he gives the stereoscope to the homeless man.

The song and its music video was mocked by Ed the Sock in his Fromage 2000 MuchMusic special.

== Charts ==
| Chart (2000) | Peak position |
|---|---|
| Canada Adult Contemporary (RPM) | 58 |
| Canada Top Singles (RPM) | 4 |
