= Sucks to Be You =

Single by Prozzäk

from the album Hot Show
- Released: 1999
- Genre: Pop
- Length: 3:22
- Label: Sony

Prozzäk singles chronology
"Omobalasire" (1998)	"Sucks to Be You" (1999)	"Strange Disease" (1999)

"Sucks to Be You" is also the name of a song by Clinton Sparks, LMFAO, Emma Blackery, and Danielle Peck.

"Sucks to Be You" is a song by Canadian pop duo Prozzäk, released as the second single from their debut album Hot Show (1998). The song peaked at #25 on the Canadian Singles Chart published by RPM. Member and songwriter Jay Levine said the song was based on an awkward encounter with a groupie as well as a comedy routine by the US filmmaker/comedian Woody Allen. Television writer/producer Stacy Traub explained the song was about her, saying "it means he didn't realize how much he hurt me until he had been hurt the way he hurt me."

Like other music videos by Prozzäk, the song's music video is animated.

== Track listing ==
CD 1
No.	Title	Length
1.	"Sucks to Be You" (single version)	3:22
2.	"Strange Disease"	3:25

CD 2
No.	Title	Length
1.	"Sucks to Be You" (album version)	3:22
2.	"Sucks to Be You" (DJBJ mix)	4:29

== Charts ==
Chart (1999)	Peak position
Canadian Singles Chart	25
MuchMusic Countdown	1
