= Jason Levine =

Canadian musician and producer

Jason Brett Levine, also known as Jay Levine, is a Canadian musician, songwriter and music producer. Jason is the brother of musician/producer Jon Levine.

== Career ==
In the 1990s, Levine was the bassist for the Juno Award-winning Canadian band The Philosopher Kings. In 1998, Levine and Philosopher Kings guitarist James Bryan McCollum created Prozzäk. Levine serves as Prozzäk's bassist and lead vocalist. Levine has written and produced songs for several performers during his career, including Michael Fredo, b4-4, Kaci Battaglia, Fefe Dobson, Susan Cagle, Honor Society, Natalie Bassingthwaighte, Miranda Cosgrove, and Charlotte Sometimes.

== Award nominations ==
In 2001, Levine and McCollum were nominated for the Juno Award for Best Producer for their production of the b4-4 single "Get Down" and the Prozzäk single "www.nevergetoveryou".
