= James Bryan McCollum =

Canadian musician

James Bryan McCollum, also known as James Bryan, is a Canadian musician, songwriter, and music producer. He is a guitarist for The Philosopher Kings and Prozzäk.

== Background ==
McCollum was born in Ottawa, Ontario and was raised in St. Catharines, Ontario. McCollum attended the University of Toronto, and left university after his second year to perform with The Philosopher Kings.

== Collaborations ==
McCollum has written, produced or performed on songs for the following performers:

- Maestro
- Marc Jordan
- Molly Johnson
- jacksoul
- b4-4
- Nelly Furtado
- Sugar Jones
- Kaci Battaglia
- EyeQ
- Fefe Dobson
- Ivana Santilli
- Billy Klippert
- Mychael Danna
- Nicole Henry
- Matt Dusk
- Lisa Marie Presley
- Maria Gadú
- Martin Garrix
- Divine Brown
- K'naan
- Kreesha Turner
- Shakura S'Aida
- Olly Murs
- Greyson Chance
- Dotan
- Emma's Imagination
- Engelbert Humperdinck
- Shane Filan
- Zaz
- Saint Lu
- James Blunt
- Fallulah
- Backstreet Boys
- Kate Ceberano
- Luis Fonsi
- Shawn Mendes
- Lowell
- Nikki Yanofsky
- Raleigh Ritchie
- Femme Schmidt

From 2007 to 2008, McCollum performed guitar for Nelly Furtado on her Get Loose Tour.

== Award nominations ==
In 2001, McCollum and Jason Levine were nominated for the Juno Award for Best Producer for their production of the b4-4 single "Get Down" and the Prozzak single "www.nevergetoveryou".
