= B4-4 =

Canadian band

- B4-4 in their music video for "Get Down" (left to right: Ryan Kowarsky, Ohad Einbinder, and Dan Kowarsky)

Background information
- Also known as: Before Four
- Origin: Toronto, Ontario, Canada
- Genres: Pop, teen pop
- Years active: 1999–2004
- Label: Sony Records
- Past members: Ryan Kowarsky; Dan Kowarsky; Ohad Einbinder

B4-4, later known as Before Four (both stylized in lowercase), was a Canadian boy band from Toronto, Ontario. The band was composed of twins Ryan and Dan Kowarsky, along with Ohad Einbinder. They were signed to Sony Records and achieved commercial success in Canada and later toured as Before Four in Germany.

== As B4-4 ==
The Kowarskys and Einbinder were friends for several years before the group officially formed in 1998. After an audition for Mike Roth of Toronto's Sony Records studios, they were signed to the label. They also signed a publishing deal with Sony/ATV.

In 2000, they released their self-titled debut album. B4-4 achieved success in Canada with the single "Get Down" and its accompanying video, and later "Go Go". Other releases included "Everyday", and "Ball and Chain". The album was certified Platinum in Canada.

In the summer of 2001, B4-4 joined Snow, Wave and soulDecision on the YTV PsykoBlast Tour and opened for Destiny's Child on MTV's Total Request Live Tour. They were also nominated for Best New Group at the 2001 Juno Awards. Also in 2001, they starred in the episode Howlin' with B4-4 in the TV series Eddy the Eco-Dog Unleashed.

== As Before Four ==
Following their success in Canada, the trio B4-4 headed to Germany, signing with Universal Music / Polydor under the name Before Four. In 2003, they released their second album, In Your Face. That album generated three singles: "Player (You're My Ecstasy)", "I'll Be There" and "Feel Free (To Say No)".

B4-4 disbanded in 2004. Ryan and Dan Kowarsky went on to form the vocal, musical, songwriting and producing duo RyanDan.

In 2021, "Get Down" was used as a Lip Sync for Your Life number in episode 7 of Canada's Drag Race second season, with which Gia Metric won her Lip sync competition.

== Discography ==
=== Albums ===
Year	Album details	Peak		Notes
Year	Album details	CA	GER	Notes
2000	B4-4: Released: CA: 2000; Label: Sony Music; Format: CD			CAN: Platinum
2003	In Your Face: Released: 30 June 2003 (General edition); 30 June 2003 [Limited German Special "(Tank) Topped Up" Edition]; 17 Nov 2003 (Special Edition); Label: Polydor, Universal Music; Format: CD			Limited Edition released only in Germany

=== Singles ===
Year	Single	Peak positions				Album
Year	Single	CAN	GER	AUT	SUI	Album
2000	"Get Down"	4	—	—	—	b4-4
2000	"Go Go"	21 (Note: "Go Go" reached number 21 when RPM ceased publication in November 2000.)	—	—	—	b4-4
2000	"Everyday"	42	—	—	—	b4-4
2001	"Ball and Chain"	47	—	—	—	b4-4
2001	"Endlessly"	—	—	—	—	b4-4
2003	"Player"	—	29	—	—	In Your Face
2003	"I'll Be There"	—	11	—	57	In Your Face
2003	"Feel Free (To Say No)"	—	8	50	—	In Your Face

== Music videos ==
Year	Single	Album
2000	Get Down	b4-4
2000	Go Go	b4-4
2000	Everyday	b4-4
2003	Player	In Your Face
2003	Feel Free (To Say No)	In Your Face

== See also ==
- RyanDan
