= Ovi Bistriceanu =

Canadian songwriter

Ovi
- Birth name: Ovidiu Bistriceanu
- Also known as: Ovi
- Origin: Năvodari, Constanța County, Romania
- Genres: Pop, dance-pop, urban, pop-rock
- Occupation(s): Songwriter, Music producer
- Years active: 2004–present
- Website: ovi-productions.com

Ovidiu Bistriceanu, known professionally as Ovi, is a Romanian-Canadian songwriter and music producer, best known for his dance-pop productions, urban and pop-rock. His collaborations include singer Mia Martina for Burning which peaked at #8 on Billboard Canadian CHR Top 40 Chart and #25 on the Billboard Canadian Hot 100 Chart, and Massari for Brand New Day which charted in several countries including Canada, Germany, Hungary and Austria. He has also worked with several other artists and musicians including French Montana, Elena Gheorghe, Andreea Bănică, Mozhdah and Nat Jay.

== Awards ==
In 2014, Ovi was awarded the SOCAN Songwriting Prize for Burning in the category Pop/Rock Music. Music Canada awarded him three Golden Records for his work on Burning in 2012 and Brand New Day and Shisha in 2016.

== Discography ==
Year	Artist	Album/Single	Details	Notes
2006	Elena Gheorghe	Vocea Ta	Co-writer, co-producer	Won Romanian Music Awards for Ochii Tai Caprui
2007	Andreea Bănică	Fiesta	Co-writer, co-producer	MTV European Music Awards Best Romanian Act
2007	Andreea Bănică	Rendez-vous	Co-writer, co-producer	
2007	Elena Gheorghe	Te Ador	Co-writer, co-producer	
2008	Elena Gheorghe	Pana la stele	Co-writer	
2008	Andreea Bănică	Lerira	Co-writer	
2009	Elena Gheorghe	The Balkan Girls	Co-writer, co-producer	Represented Romania in the Eurovision 2009 Song Contest and peaked at #1
2010	Elena Gheorghe	Disco Romancing	Co-writer	Peaked #1 on the Romanian Top 100
2011	Elena Gheorghe	Midnight Sun	Co-writer	
2011	Mia Martina	Burning	Co-writer, producer	Peaked at #8 on Billboard Canadian CHR Top 40 Chart
2012	Massari	Brand New Day	Co-writer, producer	
2012	Elena Gheorghe	"Amar Tu Vida"	Co-writer, producer	
2012	Elena Gheorghe	"Hypnotic"	Co-writer, producer	
2013	Elena Gheorghe	"Ecou"	Co-writer	Peaked #1 Romanian Airplay
2013	Massari	Shisha	Co-writer, producer	Peaked #37 on the Canadian Hot 100
2014	Mia Martina	Mia Martina	Co-writer, producer	
2015	Mia Martina	Devotion	Co-writer, producer	Peaked #77 on the Canadian Albums Chart.
