= Beast (Mia Martina song) =

Single by Mia Martina featuring Waka Flocka Flame

from the album Mia Martina
- Released: September 16, 2014
- Recorded: 2014
- Genre: Pop, dance
- Length: 3:09
- Label: CP
- Songwriters: Martine Johnson; Breyan Isaac; Juaquin Malphurs
- Producer: Breyan Isaac

Mia Martina singles chronology
"HFH (Heart Fucking Hurts)" (2014)	"Beast" (2014)

Waka Flocka Flame singles chronology
"Tell Daddy'" (2014)	"Beast" (2015)	"Game On" (2015)

"Beast" is a song recorded by Canadian singer Mia Martina for her self-titled second album (2014). It was released on September 16, 2014, by CP Records, as the fifth single from the album. The song features a guest appearance from American rapper Waka Flocka Flame. Martina and Waka Flocka wrote the track with Breyan Isaac, who also produced it.

The song peaked at number 39 on the Canadian Hot 100. It was certified Gold by Music Canada, denoting sales of 40,000 units in that country. To promote "Beast", an accompanying music video for the track was released on April 30, 2015. It features Martina running through a mysterious forest. Martin and Waka Flocka performed the song at the 2015 Much Music Video Awards.

== Background and composition ==
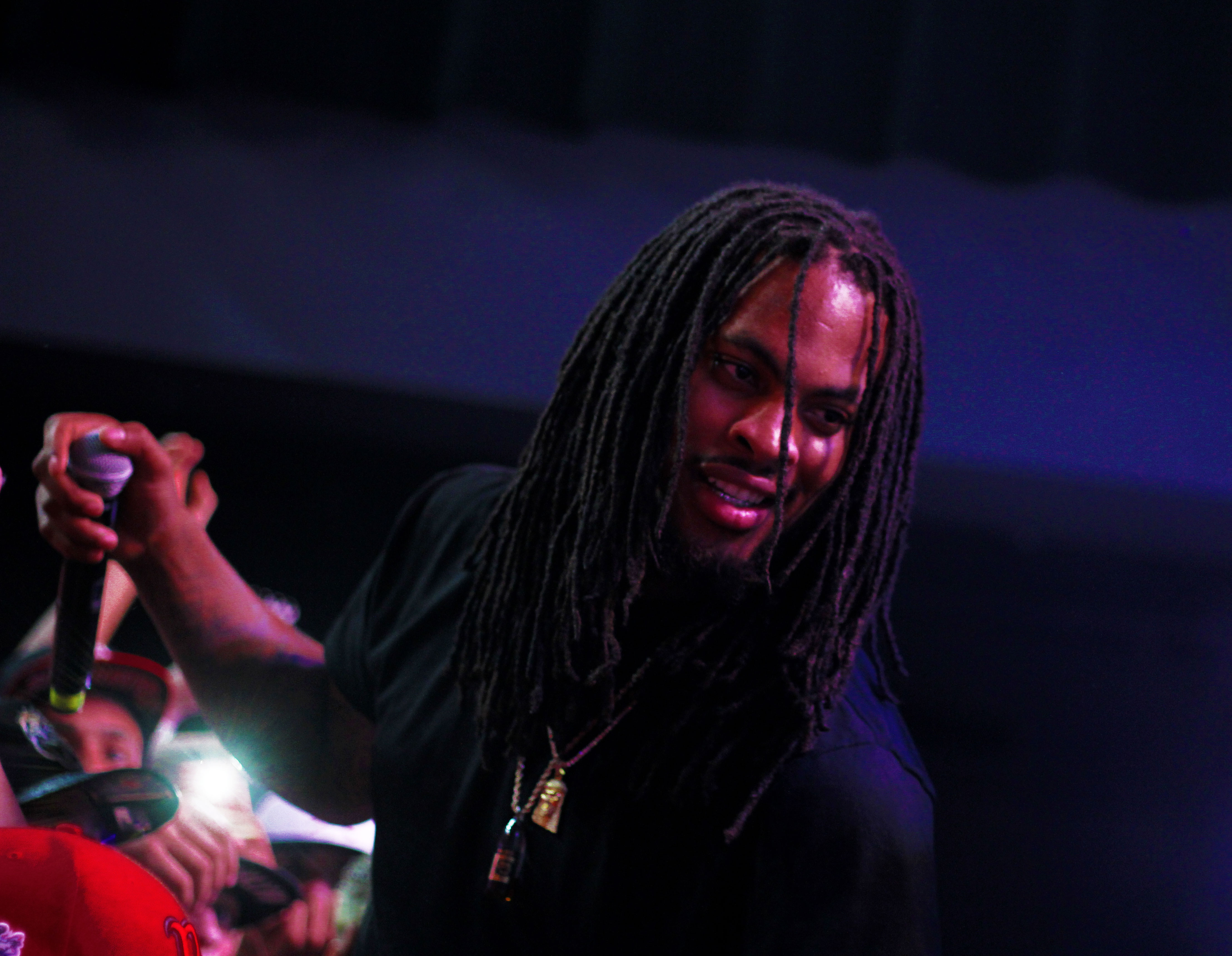
"Beast" features an additional rap verse from Waka Flocka Flame (pictured).

In September 2014 Martina revealed the self-titled second album's track list. "Beast" premiered in the same month. She eventually released the album on October 14, 2014. On April 7, 2015, "Beast" was re-released through Ultra Records. The single's artwork features Martina's hair covering half of her face.

"Beast" is a three-minute-and-nine-second-long song. It was written by Martina, Waka Flocka Flame and Breyan Isaac, the latter also produced the track. Isaac has previously written songs for artists such as Flo Rida, Pitbull, David Guetta and Nicki Minaj. In an interview with Billboard, Martina called the track "dark and sexy", while Waka Flocka, who delivers a short rap verse in the song, called it a "dope record". In an interview with ANDPOP, Martina talked about collaborating with Waka Flocka, stating, "First of all, Waka's so great, his energy is amazing. He's a rock star." Waka Flocka along with Dev are the only featured artists on Martina's album.

== Promotion ==
The song is dark and sexy, both musically and lyrically, and I wanted to carry this vibe throughout the video.

— Martina on the idea of the music video during an interview with Billboard.

A music video for the song, directed by Marc Andre Debruyne, was released on April 30, 2015. The video was nominated for Dance Video of the Year at the 2015 Much Music Video Awards. Martina performed "Beast" with Waka Flocka at the Much Music Video Awards on June 21, 2015. She also performed the track without him during her set at the Virgin Radio Beach Ball festival on August 13, 2015 in Vancouver. The song peaked at number 39 on the Canadian Hot 100 in July 2015.

== Charts ==
Chart (2015)	Peak position
Canada Hot 100 (Billboard)	39
Canada CHR/Top 40 (Billboard)	8
Canada Hot AC (Billboard)	46

== Certifications ==
Region	Certification	Certified units/sales
Canada (Music Canada)	Platinum	80,000^{‡}
Hungary (MAHASZ)	Gold	1,500^{‡}
^{‡} Sales+streaming figures based on certification alone.

== Awards and nominations ==
Year	Ceremony	Award	Result	Ref.
2015	Much Music Video Awards	Dance Video of the Year	Nominated	
