= Forever Massari =

Studio album by Massari
- Released: November 10, 2009
- Recorded: 2009
- Genres: R&B, pop
- Length: 54:46
- Label: Universal Music Canada
- Producers: Massari; Rupert Gayle; Derek Brin; Justin Forsley; Alex Greggs; Tone Mason; Rob Wells

Massari chronology
Massari (2006)	Forever Massari (2009)	Hero (2015)

Singles from Forever Massari
- 1. "Bad Girl" Released: May 2009; 2. "Body Body" Released: August 2009; 3. "Under the Radar" Released: 2010

Forever Massari is the second album by the Canadian R&B artist Massari released on November 10, 2009, under the label Universal Music Canada.

The album features co-writing and production by:

- Rupert Gayle
- Alex Greggs
- Derek Brin
- Rob Wells
- Justin Forsley

== Track listing ==
CD

#	Song title	Length
01	"Body Body"	3:42
02	"Love Triangle"	4:27
03	"Moving Target"	4:01
04	"Eyes Like Diamonds"	3:32
05	"Under The Radar"	3:26
06	"Forever Came Too Soon"	3:46
07	"Bottle It Up"	3:10
08	"Something Stopping Me"	3:34
09	"Cookie Jar"	3:56
10	"Girls Around The World"	3:40
11	"Push It On Me"	3:37
12	"Breathe"	3:30
13	"Bad Girl"	3:10
14	"Heart And Soul (Rohe Bein Edeik)"	3:37
15	"Milan"	3:30

iTunes Bonus track

#	Song title	Length
16	"Just Entertainment" (iTunes Bonus Track)	5:05
