= Body Body =

Single by Massari

from the album Forever Massari
- Released: August 2009
- Recorded: 2009
- Genre: R&B/Pop
- Length: 3:42
- Label: Universal Music Canada
- Songwriter(s): Sari Abboud; Rupert Gayle
- Producer(s): Derek Brin

Massari singles chronology
"Bad Girl" (2009)	"Body Body" (2009)	"Under the Radar" (2010)

Music video
- "Body Body" on YouTube

"Body Body" is Lebanese Canadian R&B/pop singer Massari's second single from his second studio album Forever Massari. The song samples the Salt-n-Pepa hit "Push It".

== Music video ==
A music video directed by Marc André Debruyne was released on iTunes on 10 November 2009, featuring Massari and a group of girls in a Luxy night club in Woodbridge, Ontario. Some scenes also show suggestive dancing by the girls in a disco atmosphere.

== Charts ==
Chart (2009)	Peak position
Canadian Hot 100	81
