= Latin Moon =

2011 Mia Martina song

"Latin Moon" is a song by the Canadian singer Mia Martina released on CP Records and was written by Adam Alexander, Ryan Kowarsky, Daniel Kowarsky, Alexander Vujic and Wassim Salibi (also known as Tony Sal, the founder of CP Records). A music video was released on August 4, 2011. It was directed by Marc Andrée Debruyne. The music video attracted 17 million views until December 2017.

After the success of the record, an alternative single was released featuring Massari, also a Canadian artist signed to the label with an amended music video released on December 13, 2011, months after the release of the original. The version has attracted almost 16 million views till December 2017.

== Certifications ==
Region	Certification	Certified units/sales
Canada (Music Canada)	Platinum	80,000^{‡}
^{‡} Sales+streaming figures based on certification alone.
