= Be Easy =

Be Easy may refer to:

- "Be Easy" (T.I. song), a single by T.I
- "Be Easy" (Massari song), a single by Massari
- "Be Easy" (Ghostface Killah song), a single by Ghostface Killah
