= Mamma Mia (He's Italiano) =

- Cover artwork used in the United States.

Single by Elena featuring Glance
- Released: 5 August 2014
- Genre: Dance
- Length: 3:37
- Label: Cat; Robbins
- Songwriters: Clint Tommy; Laurenţiu Duţă
- Producer: Laurenţiu Duţă

Elena singles chronology
"Până Dimineața" (2013)	"Mamma Mia (He's Italiano)" (2014)	"Señor Loco" (2015)

Music video
- "Mamma Mia (He's Italiano)" on YouTube

"Mamma Mia (He's Italiano)" is a song recorded and released as a single by Romanian singer Elena Gheorghe, featuring rapper Glance. This marks their second collaboration, the first one being the native number one single "Ecou" (2013). "Mamma Mia" was initially released for digital download and streaming in the United States on 5 August 2014 under Robbins Entertainment, and worldwide the following year in July under Cat Music. An English language track, it was written by Clint Tommy and Laurenţiu Duţă, while the production was being handled by Duţă.

Music critics gave the song mostly positive reviews, complimenting its catchy instrumentals, but doubted the role of the featured artist by calling it "not convincing". An accompanying music video for "Mamma Mia", directed by Dan Petcan and Bogdan Filip, premiered on the Cat Music YouTube channel on 21 May 2014 and was supported by a giveaway. The clip depicted Elena at wedding playing the role of the bride, and Italian male as the groomsman. Commercially, the song was modernly successful, peaking at number 33 on the singer's native Romanian Airplay 100. The song was also sent to radio stations across Italy, Poland and Spain, where it had managed to enter several charts.

== Background and composition ==
"Mamma Mia (He's Italiano)"
A 28-second sample of "Mamma Mia (He's Italiano)", which has been described as a catchy dance-pop tune.

In February 2014, Elena went on local radio station Kiss FM for an interview, where she would announce an international single coming up. At the time of the interview, Laurențiu Duță was producing the song in Los Angeles.

"Mamma Mia (He's Italiano)" was written by Clint Tommy and Laurenţiu Duţă, while the production was being handled by Duţă himself. It was initially sent to radio stations across Italy in July, before being released on streaming devices in the United States by Robbins Entertainment the following month. +Mas Music distributed the song's release on 23 January 2015, while Cat Music handled its worldwide release on 13 July. "Mamma Mia" marks Elena and Glance's second collaboration, the first one being "Ecou" (2013), which achieved huge chart success in the singer's native country. An English language love song, "Mamma Mia" was described as a catchy dance-pop tune. Lyrically, the song is about Elena questing whether she should date a romantic Italian man, knowing well that she will be played on by him. Some lyrics of the song are: "I just can't getting off my mind he's so amazing / My heart says Yes, my mind says No / Just let him go, go, go."

== Reception and Promotion ==
Upon its release, "Mamma Mia" was met positively by music critics. Jonathan Currinn gave the song five stars, calling it a "lost treasure that we'll forever love". He went on to compliment the music video, which he called "completely epic" and "full-on amazingness in every way". He called out the clip's director Dan Petcan for his "terrific job at directing [it]", and Elena for her acting skills which were described as "brilliant". Zuletzt Aktualisiert from HitFire described the song as a "catchy dance pop track". He found the song rather amusing, and called the lyrics for being "the typical clichés about Italian men". However, he criticized the role of Glance, the featured artist, by calling his part "not convincing". Website TurnuCuStiri awarded "Mamma Mia" with the "song of the week" on 11 June 2014, praising the song for "having everything [a song] would need to be a summer hit" Italian site Radio Date praised the song, saying that "[it] recalls other summer hits".

To promote the song, the singer embarked into a ten-show tour in Poland. Elena and Glance would later go on to perform the single at local radio station ProFM, along with a cover of Shontelle's "Impossible". "Mamma Mia' was also sent to various radio stations in Italy, Poland, Romania and Spain, and managed to enter a few charts. In the singer's native country, the song peaked at number 33 on the Airplay 100, while in Poland's radio station Radio Eska it peaked at number six. Romanian singer, dancer and moderator George Papagheorghe impersonated Elena and covered the track on native interactive talent show Te cunosc de undeva!.

== Music video ==
The music video for "Mamma Mia" was produced by Dan Petcan and directed by Bogdan Filip. It was uploaded onto the Cat Music YouTube channel on 21 May, and premiered on the Romanian TV talk-show Neatza cu Razvan si Dani on 28 May. A behind the scenes video was also uploaded on 5 August, which was supported by a contest where the winner would get a Nokia Lumia 1320 phone.

A screenshot from the music video. Elena (middle) is seen getting ready for the wedding with some fellow females.

Filmed at Club Dignitas in Bucharest, the story takes action in Southern Italy. The video starts with Elena, playing the bride, and the groom getting ready in their respective rooms with their helpers and friends. Elena peeks out her door to see the Italian guy, played by George Pistereanu, sitting on a chair outside her door. She takes a moment before heading out the door and engaging in a flirty commotion, where he chases her while she acts coy. She goes up to her groom and straightens his jacket, before heading outside with him to get married. The narrative continues with the dinner and the party fully get on the way. The Italian guy continues to chase her, but her mother is always watching or stepping in. During Glance's bit of the song, the groom and the groomsmen can be seen having a party in the room they were previously getting ready in. One of the bridesmaids can be seen dancing sexily over Glance, before turning her attention to the groom. Elena sees all this and puts a stop to it. The party continues until near the end where Elena sees her groom and the bridesmaid behind a tree, ending their embrace and her dress is unzipped at the back; he withdraws his hand from under the back of her dress. At the very end, Elena is sitting on some stairsteps changing her shoes, where the Italiano guy wraps his jacket around her before leaving with his mates.

== Track listing ==
- Official versions
1. "Mamma Mia (He's Italiano) (Radio Edit)" – 3:37
2. "Mamma Mia (He's Italiano) (Extended)" – 4:32
3. "Mamma Mia (He's Italiano) (Instrumental)" – 3:36
4. "Mamma Mia (He's Italiano) (Bodybangers Remix)" – 5:48
5. "Mamma Mia (He's Italiano) (Bodybangers Edit)" – 3:35
6. "Mamma Mia (He's Italiano) (Bodybangers Remix Extended)" – 5:48

== Personnel ==
Credits adapted from Tidal.

- Elena – vocals
- Glance – vocals, featured artist
- Clint Tommy – songwriting
- Laurenţiu Duţă – songwriting, production

== Charts ==
=== Weekly charts ===
Chart (2014)	Peak position
Poland (Polish Airplay Top 100)	20
Romania (Airplay 100)	33
Spain (PROMUSICAE)	47

=== Year-end charts ===
Chart (2014)	Peak position
Mexico (Sonido Global)	54
Romania (Media Forest)	96

== Release History ==
Country	Date	Format(s)	Label	Ref.
Romania	25 July 2014	Radio airplay	Cat	
United States	5 August 2014	Digital download/streaming	Robbins	
Mexico	23 January 2015	Digital download/streaming	Mas	
Various	13 July 2015	Digital download/streaming	Cat	

== See also ==
- List of music released by Romanian artists that has charted in major music markets
