= Midnight Sun (Elena song) =

Single by Elena

from the album Disco Romancing
- Released: 16 November 2010
- Length: 3:15
- Label: Cat Music
- Songwriters: Laurenţiu Duţă, Ovidiu Bistriceanu
- Producer: Duţă

Elena singles chronology
"Disco Romancing" (2010)	"Midnight Sun" (2010)	"Hot Girls" (2011)

"Midnight Sun" is a song by Romanian singer Elena Gheorghe, released under her mononym Elena as the lead single from her 2012 third studio album of the same name on 16 November 2010 by Cat Music. It was written by Laurențiu Duță and Ovidiu Bistriceanu, with the former having been a frequent collaborator of Elena's up to that point. The song is a follow-up to "Disco Romancing" (2010), which marked a departure from the Latin music that she had become known for in favor of a dance-pop sound.

Commercially, "Midnight Sun" reached number five on the Romanian Top 100 and also charted within the top 30 in the Netherlands. An accompanying music video for the song was uploaded to YouTube by Cat Music on 13 May 2011. Directed by Dragoș Buliga, it was filmed at the National History Museum of Romania in Bucharest and shows Elena portraying multiple different characters, with each of them having a respective outfit and setting. For further promotion, she performed the song live on television in Romania.

== Background and release ==
Elena first rose to prominence in Romania in 2002, when she became the lead singer of the Latin music band Mandinga. They released domestically successful singles throughout the early 2000s, including 2005's "Soarele meu" (Romanian: "My Sun"), before Elena left the group in 2006 to pursue a solo career. She premiered "Vocea ta" (Romanian: "Your Voice") that same year, reaching number eight on the Romanian Top 100. She went on to represent Romania at the Eurovision Song Contest 2009 with "The Balkan Girls", which placed 19th in the final and became her first number-one hit in Romania. She then topped the native chart again with "Disco Romancing" (2010), which also charted in other countries such as the Netherlands, and which marked a departure from the Latin-styled music that Elena had become known for in favor of a dance-pop sound.

Elena had teased the follow-up single, "Midnight Sun", on her YouTube channel, before Cat Music uploaded it to their channel on the same platform on 16 November 2010. They made the song available for digital download on 16 May 2011 in various countries. "Midnight Sun" served as the second single off of Elena's third studio album Disco Romancing (2012). Romanian singer and songwriter Laurențiu Duță, a longtime collaborator of Elena's up to that point, proposed her to try a different genre. He also wrote "Disco Romancing" and produced "Midnight Sun", the latter was co-written with Ovidiu Bistriceanu. An editor of Urban.ro opined that "Midnight Sun" fit into the music trend of that time and that its instrumentation prominently included a trumpet.

== Commercial performance ==
According to Media Forest, "Midnight Sun" was the most-played domestic song on Romanian radio for the week ending 24 April 2011. It also reached number five on their overall radio and television airplay charts in April and May 2011, respectively, before peaking at number five on the main Romanian Top 100 chart in June 2011. The song then reached number 21 on the Dutch Single Top 100 in October 2011, as well as number nine on the Dutch Top 40 that same month. At the end of 2011, "Midnight Sun" was ranked as 61st and 98th most-successful single of the year on the Romanian Top 100 and Dutch Single Top 100, respectively. In Poland, it was listed as the third-highest new entry on the country's airplay chart in April 2012.

== Promotion ==
=== Music video ===
==== Release and filming ====
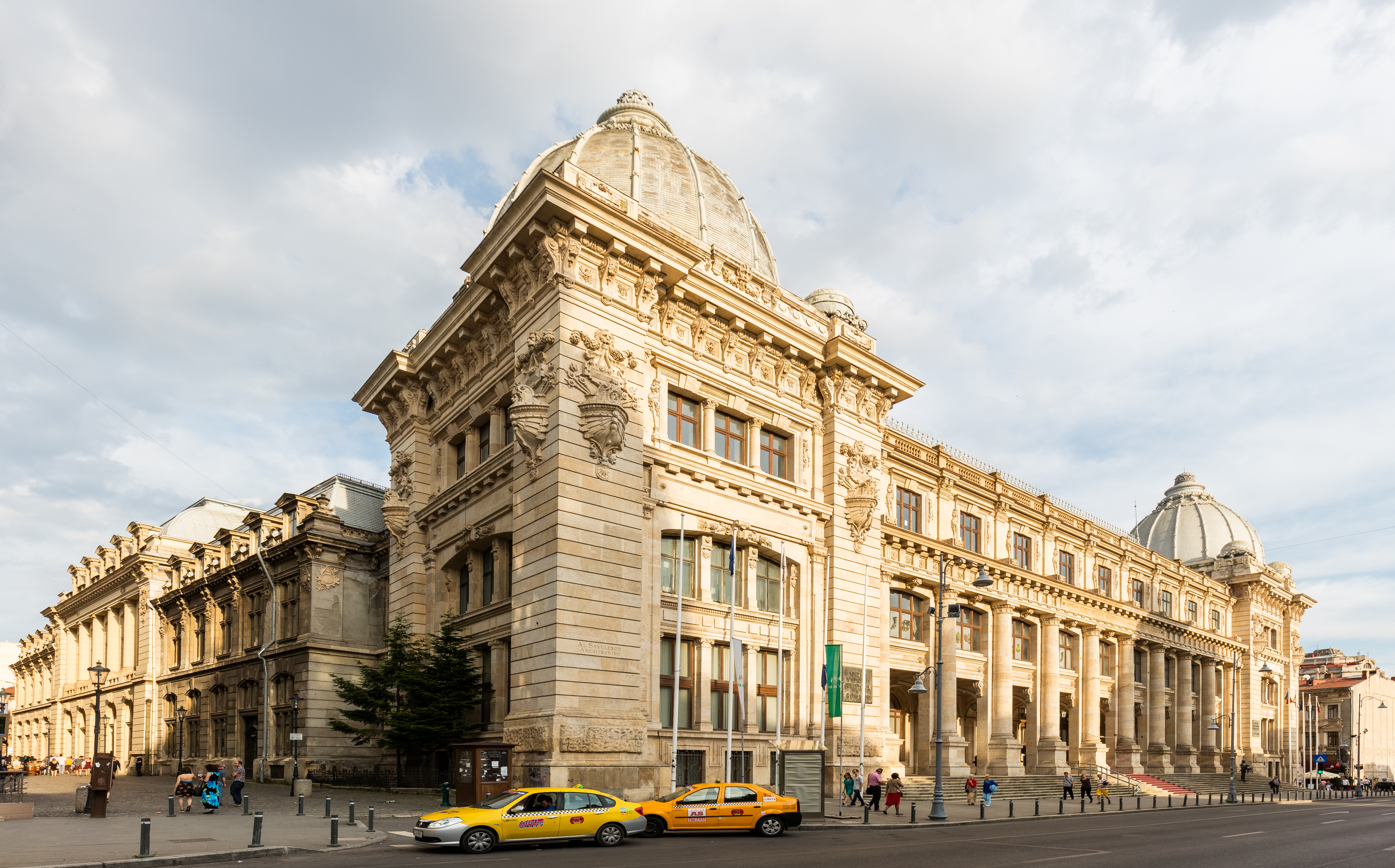
The music video was filmed at the National History Museum of Romania (pictured) in Bucharest

An accompanying music video for "Midnight Sun" was uploaded to Cat Music's YouTube channel on 13 May 2011. Directed by Dragoş Buliga, it was filmed around late April 2011 at the National History Museum of Romania in Bucharest in the span of 20 hours. The shoot, which Elena characterized as "fun and tiring", started at around 8 AM and had to be ended the next day due to an event that was scheduled to take place in the museum. Other people involved were Paul Gheorghe as the choreographer and Cătălin Enache as the stylist; Elena developed ideas for the outfits used in the music video with the latter, which were ultimately tailored at her own tailoring studio.

Elena contributed part of the ideas for the music video. In a scene, she is seen bathing in an enormous cup that was custom-made for her body measurements, filled with strawberry sirup. Elena lost five kilograms within a week for the shoot, regarding which she stated: "I went to the gym every day, to the sauna, I gave up sweets and bread. I was very conscientious and did crunches even at home in the evenings".

==== Synopsis ====
Elena portrays several characters in the music video, with each having a distinct outfit and setting.

The music video consists of alternated shots of Elena portraying different characters, with each of them having a respective outfit and setting. This aspect of the music video prompted an Urban.ro writer to call it "quite interesting". For the first character, Elena wears a black bob, fingerless black gloves and a white dress with black garments underneath. She is either in front of a white background, where black hands occasionally appear next to her face, or walking through the museum. Several fonts appear next to her, some of which make her look like posing for a magazine cover. The second character sees Elena with open hair in a red-lit dark room, sporting a red skirt and red high heels. She bathes inside an oversized cup with a saucer and a red tea bag, while a font reading "Tea Time" is displayed next to her. Elena also occasionally throws water at the camera or dances in front of the cup, swinging the tea bag with her hands.

For the third character, she sports a green dress and wears bangs and a ponytail. She is accompanied by three other women and either dances with them in a split screen or is shown walking down stairs with them. In another scene, Elena has put-up hair and sports a blue, beige and silver outfit while dancing to the song as fonts such as the tracklist of her Disco Romancing album appear next to her. For another character, she wears an orange top, green shorts, silver high heel ankle boots, black fingerless gloves and a black eyepatch. She also has characters from Alice's Adventures in Wonderland tattooed on her left arm, and performs synchronized choreography with two other women, who wear silver outfits and peaked caps; violet light occasionally shines behind them. For the last character, the font "Vintage Times" appears next to Elena as she is wearing a turban, a black-and-beige bodysuit and long black fingerless gloves. Men are shown playing instruments behind her, such as a piano, a drum kit, a trumpet, a violin and a conga, and she sometimes interacts with them.

=== Live performances ===
Elena performed "Midnight Sun" on the native morning show 'Neatza cu Răzvan și Dani on three occasions: on 7 December 2010, on 19 May 2011 and on 5 September 2011. She also sang the song during Pro TV's New Year's Eve programming in 2011.

== Track listings ==
- Official versions (Note: This is a summary of all digital versions of the single.)
1. "Midnight Sun" – 3:15
2. "Midnight Sun" (Radio Edit)
3. "Midnight Sun" (Extended Mix) – 3:44
4. "Midnight Sun" (Instrumental) – 3:15
5. "Midnight Sun" (Lg Maiwenn Club Remix) – 5:54
6. "Midnight Sun" (Lg Maiwenn Club Short Remix) – 3:29
7. "Midnight Sun" (Nick Corline Remix) – 7:15
8. "Midnight Sun" (Nick Corline Radio Edit) – 3:39
9. "Midnight Sun" (Swindlers Extended Remix) – 5:14
10. "Midnight Sun" (Swindlers Edit Remix) – 3:33

== Charts ==
=== Weekly charts ===
2011–2012 weekly chart performance for "Midnight Sun"
Chart (2011–2012)	Peak position
Netherlands (Single Top 100)	21
Netherlands (Dutch Top 40)	9
Netherlands (Dance Top 30)	3
Poland Airplay (ZPAV)	—N/a (Note: "Midnight Sun" was ranked at the third-highest new entry on the main airplay chart for the week ending 6 April 2012.)
Romania (Romanian Top 100)	5
Romania (Nielsen Music Control)	15
Romania Airplay (Media Forest)	5
Romania TV Airplay (Media Forest)	5

=== Year-end charts ===
2011 year-end chart performance for "Midnight Sun"
Chart (2011)	Position
Netherlands (Single Top 100)	98
Netherlands (Dutch Top 40)	52
Romania (Romanian Top 100)	61
Romania (Media Forest)	31

== Release history ==
Release dates for "Midnight Sun"
Region	Date	Format	Label	Ref.
Various	16 November 2010	Streaming	Cat Music	
Various	13 May 2011	Digital download	Cat Music	
United States	6 September 2011	Digital download	Ultra Records	

== See also ==
- List of music released by Romanian artists that has charted in major music markets
