= Bad Girl (Massari song) =

Single by Massari

from the album Forever Massari
- Released: May 2009
- Recorded: 2009
- Genre: R&B, pop
- Length: 3:09
- Label: Universal Music Canada
- Songwriter(s): Sari Abboud, Rupert Gayle, Justin Forsley
- Producer(s): Justin Forsley

Massari singles chronology
"In Love Again" (2008)	"Bad Girl" (2009)	"Body Body" (2009)

Music video
- "Bad Girl" on YouTube

"Bad Girl" is a song by Lebanese/Canadian R&B/pop singer Massari. It is the first single from his second studio album Forever Massari.

== Music video ==
A music video was released on June 9, 2009, featuring Massari's love interest driving a Lotus Exige and Massari following closely behind on a motorbike. It also shows Massari on the beach with the woman.

== Charts ==
Chart (2009)	Peak position
Canadian Hot 100	77
