= Disco Romancing =

Single by Elena

from the album Disco Romancing
- Released: 5 May 2010
- Genre: Dance-pop
- Length: 3:27
- Label: Cat Music
- Songwriters: Laurențiu Duță; Ovidiu Bistriceanu

Elena singles chronology
"The Balkan Girls" (2009)	"Disco Romancing" (2010)	"Midnight Sun" (2010)

"Disco Romancing" is a song recorded by Romanian singer Elena Gheorghe, released under her mononym Elena on 5 May 2010 as the lead single from her 2012 third studio album of the same name. It was written by Laurențiu Duță and Ovidiu Bistriceanu, with the former having been a frequent collaborator of Elena's up to that point. He was also the one who proposed to Elena that she try a genre different from the Latin music she had become known for. This resulted in "Disco Romancing", a dance-pop song.

At the 2011 Radio România Actualităţi Awards, "Disco Romancing" received a nomination for Best Dance-Pop Song. Commercially, it became Elena's second number-one single in Romania and also reached the charts in the Czech Republic, Hungary, the Netherlands and Slovakia. An accompanying music video for "Disco Romancing" was uploaded to YouTube by Cat Music on 31 May 2010. Directed by Dragoș Buliga, it prominently shows Elena zorbing on a field next to the Autostrada Soarelui motorway alongside a man and a woman. For further promotion, Elena performed the song live on television in Romania.

== Background and release ==
Elena first rose to prominence in Romania in 2002, when she became the lead singer of the Latin music band Mandinga. They released domestically successful singles throughout the early 2000s, including 2005's "Soarele meu" (Romanian: "My Sun"), before Elena left the group in 2006. She then began a successful solo career, with "Vocea ta" (Romanian: "Your Voice"), issued that same year, reaching number eight on the Romanian Top 100. She went on to represent Romania at the Eurovision Song Contest 2009 with "The Balkan Girls", which placed 19th in the final and became her first number-one hit in Romania.

In general, I don't think about the commercial side when it comes to songs, [Duță] is the one who knows exactly what the target audience wants. Depending on the market's demands, [he] proposes [something], and if I like the song, believe in it and consider that it represents me, I say yes and focus on the interpretation, on the work in the studio.

—Elena on the way she collaborated with Laurențiu Duță.

Prior to the official release of the follow-up single, "Disco Romancing", a remix of it was leaked online. Elena subsequently published the song on her official website on 5 May 2010, and it received its radio airplay premiere on the Romanian station Kiss FM that same month. Cat Music made "Disco Romancing" available for digital download in several countries on 31 May 2010. It served as the lead single off of Elena's 2012 third studio album of the same name.

"Disco Romancing", a dance-pop song, marks a departure from the Latin-styled music that Elena had become known for, an idea that was proposed to her by the Romanian singer and songwriter Laurențiu Duță, who co-wrote the song alongside Ovidiu Bistriceanu. Duță had been a frequent collaborator of Elena's up to that point, having also been involved in writing "The Balkan Girls" and Mandinga's "Soarele meu". Elena referred to making music of a different genre as a "challenge", but stated she would not definitively give up on releasing Latin music since it represented her well.

== Reception ==
"Disco Romancing" first reached number one on the Romanian Top 100 in October 2010 and claimed that position for two weeks. Around March 2011, the song received notable airplay on the major Spanish dance radio station Máxima FM. In May 2011, "Disco Romancing" reached number 12 on the Czech radio airplay chart, and in August 2011, it peaked at number 59 in the Netherlands. The song also charted at number ten in Hungary in September 2011 and peaked at number 24 in Slovakia throughout that same year.

Romanian artists Boier Bibescu and Delia were subjected to controversy in 2010 when some observers noted striking similarities between their then-new song "Slap Me with Da Bass" and "Disco Romancing"; Elena thought the former was not a plagiarism of her track, but opined that "Disco Romancing" had created a musical trend that other artists had capitalized on. At the 2011 Radio România Actualităţi Awards, "Disco Romancing" received a nomination for Best Dance-Pop Song.

== Music video ==
=== Release and filming ===
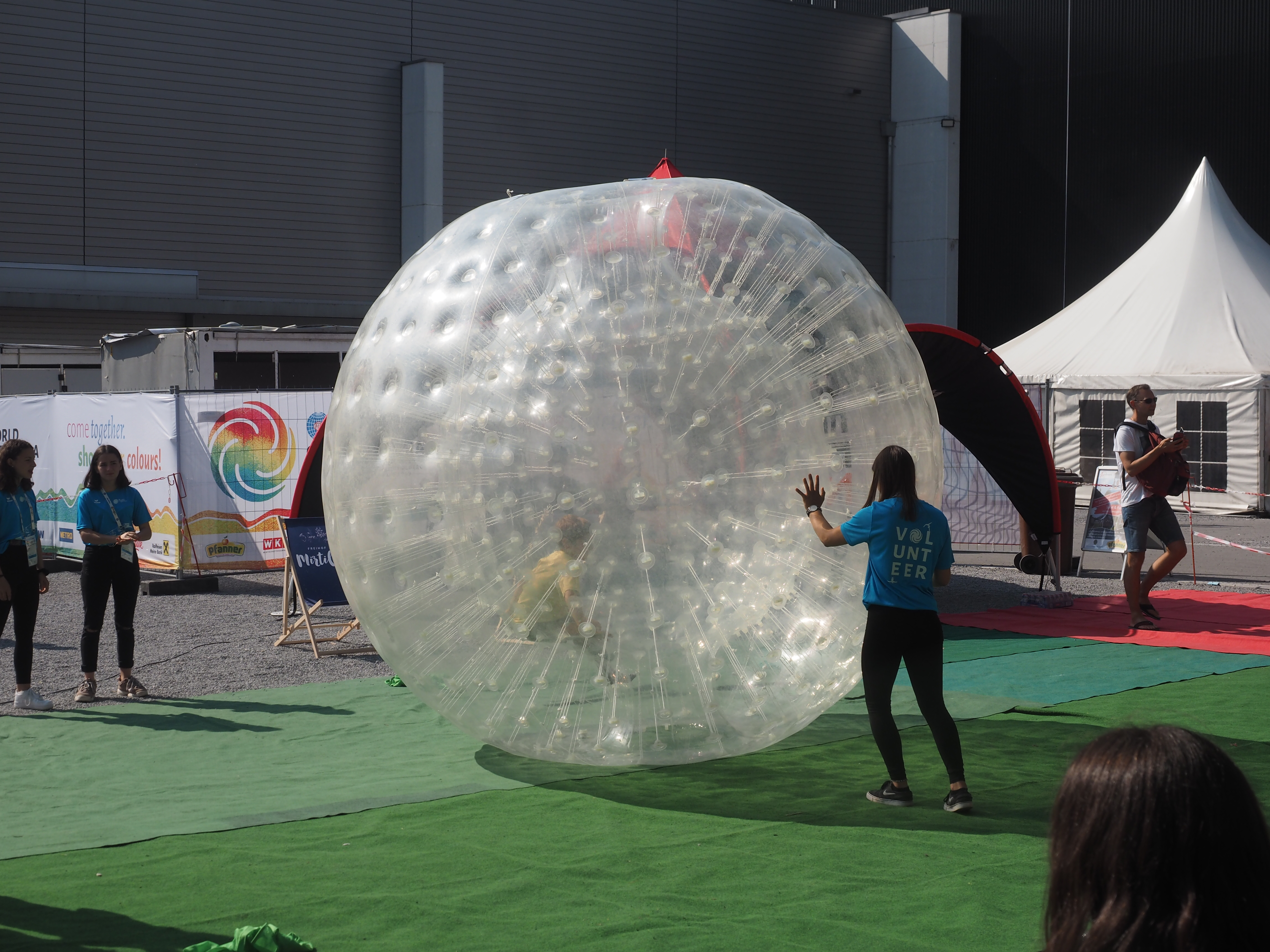
The music video features zorbing (pictured), an extreme sport Elena had heard of in a documentary.

Cat Music uploaded an accompanying music video for "Disco Romancing" to their YouTube channel on 31 May 2010. The clip had its television premiere on the morning show 'Neatza cu Răzvan și Dani on Antena 1 on 3 June 2010. Directed by Dragoș Buliga, it was filmed in late April or early May 2010 in the span of 16 hours on a field next to the Autostrada Soarelui motorway, which links Bucharest and Constanța, as well as in a gas station. Buliga had been a longtime collaborator of Elena's, having worked with her since "Soarele meu"; further people involved in the music video were Florin Noja as the hair stylist, Dana Argeşan as the make-up artist, Luiza Comşa as the choreographer and Cătălin Enache as the stylist. Elena described the shoot as "fun, but also exhausting".

She intended for the music video to convey a "good mood" to the viewer and to be "colorful" and "energetic". She contributed its two main idea; the first one was to feature zorbing, an extreme sport that she had seen in a documentary, in which people roll downhill inside enormous plastic balls. The second one was portraying herself inside a car with a man with a mohawk and a woman wearing a "weird" hair style. Elena had photographed a woman with "strange" hair that she liked when she travelled to London and kept the picture as a reference for the video. For the zorbing scenes in the clip, Elena was required to be on an empty stomach in order to not get nauseous. Regarding the clothing used in the video, she wanted some of it to be military-themed. The outfits were mostly created in Elena's own tailoring studio by her and Enache, but also in the studio of Mirela Diaconu.

=== Synopsis ===
The music video shows Elena posing in front of a pink cloth as she wears a skirt made out of developed pictures of herself.

The video starts with Elena alongside a man and a woman, arriving on an empty, camera-surveilled site. They are dressed in mostly all-khaki outfits, with Elena wearing a pointy bra and a side cap with several brooches attached to it. The man pulls out a green pistol, which beams a turquoise car, which they all get in, following which they drive to a green field. They get out of the car, and the man extends a long piece of pink cloth over the car's open hood, which Elena poses in front of. They then get away from the car and further into the field, with Elena continuing to pose in front of the cloth as the other woman takes pictures of her; Elena first wears a skirt made out of developed pictures of herself and then sports an outfit made out of a black bra, black shorts and a multicolored cloth worn over her shoulders.

She is then shown blowing a bubble with bubblegum, which transitions into a transparent enormous plastic ball that is rolled by the man and the woman across the field. Shots also show the inside of the ball, where Elena is wearing a bright orange cloth and holding a doll in her hands, which is dressed in an outfit of a similar color. Subsequently, Elena and the two drive to the outside of a gas station that is lit in different colors as they perform synchronized choreography, with one additional dancer joining them. They wear black outfits and Elena's is differentiated by white stripes. Near the end of the video, the man is shown pulling a fuel dispenser that shoots multicolored sparks. The clip closes with Elena shown from behind, with her putting her hands through her put-up hair, before turning to the camera.

== Live performances ==
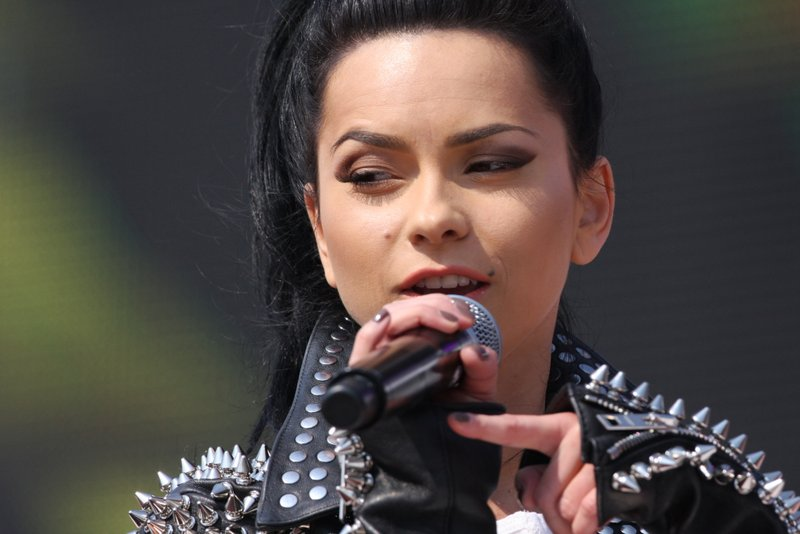
Romanian singer Inna (pictured) played the song during a performance in Paris in 2011.

Elena gave several televised live performances of the song in Romania. On 6 July 2010, she appeared on Acces direct, and on 29 July on Liber la vacanță. On 23 September, she performed on 'Neatza cu Răzvan și Dani. Elena also sang the song during Pro TV's New Year's Eve programming in both 2010 and 2011.

The success of "Disco Romancing" yielded Elena's first international concerts, regarding which she stated: "I have the Eurovision training! After singing on the huge stage in Moscow, nothing seems difficult to me anymore". During Romanian singer Inna's appearance at the Metropolis club in Paris in 2011, she played "Disco Romancing". Elena further performed the song at an event organized by Europa FM in April 2014.

== Track listings ==
- Official versions (Note: This is a summary of all digital versions of the single.)
1. "Disco Romancing" – 3:27
2. "Disco Romancing" (Radio Edit) – 3:27
3. "Disco Romancing" (Video Edit) – 3:12
4. "Disco Romancing" (Extended Version) – 4:26
5. "Disco Romancing" (Bonne DJ Remix) – 3:46
6. "Disco Romancing" (Frisco Extended Mix) – 4:51
7. "Disco Romancing" (Frisco Remix Edit) – 3:02
8. "Disco Romancing" (Lockout's Digital Disko Mix) – 5:38
9. "Disco Romancing" (UK Radio Edit) – 4:26

== Charts ==
=== Weekly charts ===
2010–2011 weekly chart performance for "Disco Romancing"
Chart (2010–2011)	Peak position
Czech Republic Airplay (ČNS IFPI)	12
Hungary (Single Top 40)	10
Hungary (Dance Top 40)	3
Netherlands (Single Top 100)	59
Netherlands (Dutch Top 40)	19
Netherlands (Dance Top 30)	15
Romania (Romanian Top 100)	1
Romania (Romanian Radio Airplay)	1
Romania (Romania TV Airplay)	1
Slovakia Airplay (ČNS IFPI)	24

=== Year-end charts ===
2010 year-end chart performance for "Disco Romancing"
Chart (2010)	Position
Romania (Media Forest)	14 (Note: While România Liberă reports "Disco Romancing" as ranking 14th on the year-end chart compiled by Media Forest, the latter's website shows the song as ranking 15th.)

2011 year-end chart performance for "Disco Romancing"
Chart (2011)	Position
Romania (Media Forest)	73

== Release history ==
Release dates for "Disco Romancing"
Region	Date	Format	Label	Ref.
Various	5 May 2010	Unknown		
Romania	May 2010	Radio airplay	Unknown	
Various	31 May 2010	Digital download	Cat Music	
United States	7 December 2010	Digital download	Ultra Records	
Australia	19 February 2011	Digital download	Central Station	
New Zealand	19 February 2011	Digital download	Central Station	

== See also ==
- List of Romanian Top 100 number ones
- List of music released by Romanian artists that has charted in major music markets
