= Vocea Ta =

Album by Elena Gheorghe

Studio album by Elena Gheorghe
- Released: June 2006
- Recorded: 2004–2006
- Genre: Latino, dance-pop
- Length: 33:37
- Label: Sincron Records, Roton
- Producer: Laurențiu Duță, Ovidiu Bistriceanu, Daris Mangal

Elena Gheorghe chronology
Vocea Ta (2006)	'Lilicea Vreariei' (2008)

Singles from Vocea Ta
- 1. "Vocea Ta" Released: May 2006; 2. "Ochii Tăi Căprui" Released: January 2007

Vocea ta (Romanian for Your Voice) is the debut solo studio album by Romanian singer-songwriter Elena Gheorghe. Released in summer 2006, it is her first studio album since leaving the Latino pop band Mandinga, where she was the lead vocalist until 2005. The album is of pop, Latino-pop and dance music genre, being very similar to her two previous albums with Mandinga.

"Vocea Ta", the lead single of the album, was a smash radio hit in Romania. It reached #24 in the list of the most heard songs in 2006 and became later a top-ten hit in the Romanian Top 100. The second and final single from the full-length record was released in January 2007, although it reached only #21 in the Romanian charts, it had much bigger success than her previous hit. Later it won the award of "Best song of 2007" accorded by the Romanian Music Awards. Gheorghe was named the female of 2006 by the RRA Awards. The album also contains a remix of "Soarele Meu", a previous hit made with Mandinga.

== Track listing ==
No.	Title	Length
1.	"Vocea Ta (Your voice)"	3:34
2.	"Dulce Ca Mierea (Sweet like honey)"	3:05
3.	"N-ai Să Vii (You will not come)"	3:21
4.	"Ochii Tăi Căprui (Your brown eyes)"	3:10
5.	"Dorinţe (Wishes)"	3:16
6.	"Dans Latino (Latino dance)"	3:25
7.	"Noaptea Sau În Zori (Night or day)"	3:30
8.	"Paradisul (The paradise)"	3:22
9.	"Vocea Ta (Summertime Remix)"	3:32
10.	"Soarele Meu (Lucaccione Remix)"	3:22

== Singles ==
Charted singles
Title	Year	Chart	English translation
Title	Year	ROM	English translation
"Vocea Ta"	2006	8	"Your Voice"
"Ochii Tăi Căprui"	2007	21	"Your Brown Eyes"

== Awards ==
Year	Award	Category	Nominated work	Result
2006	RRA Awards	Best song 2006	Vocea Ta	Nominated
2006	RRA Awards	Best interpret 2006	Elena Gheorghe	Won
2007	Romanian Music Awards	Best song 2007	Ochii Tăi Căprui	Won
