= Massari (album) =

Studio album by Massari
- Released: May 31, 2005
- Recorded: 2004–2005
- Studio: Capital Prophet Studios
- Genres: Crunk, hip-hop
- Length: 47:28
- Label: Capital Prophets Records Inc.
- Producers: Belly; Massari; Jason "DaHeala" Quenneville; Lynx

Massari chronology
Massari (2005)	Forever Massari (2009)

Singles from Massari
- 1. "Smile for Me" Released: January 2005; 2. "Be Easy" Released: April 2005; 3. "Real Love" Released: 2006; 4. "Rush the Floor" Released: 2006

Massari is the debut album by the Canadian artist Massari, released on May 31, 2005, under the label CP Records. It was co-written and co-produced by the rapper Belly and Massari, with further production from DaHeala and Lynx. The album features the hit tracks "Smile for Me" featuring Loon, "Be Easy", "Real Love", and "Rush the Floor" featuring Belly. The album was certified Gold by Music Canada with over 50,000 copies sold.

== Track listing ==
All songs written and composed by S. Abboud, except where noted.

#	Song title	Composer(s)	Length
01	"Intro"		0:44
02	"Be Easy"	S. Abboud	3:25
03	"Find a Partner"	S. Abboud	3:34
04	"Smile for Me" (feat. Loon)	A. Balshe, S. Abboud, C. Hawkins	4:22
05	"When I Saw You"	S. Abboud	0:51
06	"Real Love"	S. Abboud	4:35
07	"Rush the Floor" (feat. Belly)	A. Balshe, S. Abboud	4:15
08	"Gone Away"	S. Abboud	4:09
09	"Who Knows"	S. Abboud	3:09
10	"Don't Let Go" (feat. Belly)	A. Balshe, S. Abboud	4:12
11	"Show Me"	S. Abboud	4:24
12	"Follow My Lead" (feat. Vico C)	S. Abboud, V. Ibrahim	3:22
13	"Inta Hayati"	S. Abboud	3:20
14	"What Kinda Girl?"	S. Abboud	5:06

== Personnel ==
Adapted from the Massari liner notes.

- Executive Producer: Tony Sal
- Director of Operations: A. Balshe
- Vocal Arrangement: Lynx
- Art Design: Chris McJannet
- Photography: M. Govindji
- Graphics: C. Lavergne
