= Shisha (song) =

Single by Massari featuring French Montana

from the EP Hero
- Released: May 21, 2013
- Recorded: 2013
- Genre: Hip hop
- Length: 3:23
- Label: CP
- Songwriters: Sari Abboud; Karim Kharbouch; Breyan Isaac; Ovidiu Bistriceanu; Dre Marshall
- Producer: Ovi

Massari singles chronology
"Brand New Day" (2012)	"Shisha" (2013)	"What About the Love" (2014)

French Montana singles chronology
"Ain't Worried About Nothin'" (2013)	"Shisha" (2013)	"I Swear" (2013)

"Shisha" is a song by Lebanese Canadian singer Massari. It is the third single off his first EP Hero. The song was released on May 21, 2013 and features vocals from American rapper French Montana. The single peaked at number 37 on the Canadian Hot 100. It received a Gold certification from Music Canada, denoting sales of 40,000 units in that country.

== Music video ==
The video was directed by Canadian director RT! and made its premiere on MuchMusic's New.Music.Live. on July 4. The video features Massari's manager Manny Dion around the 0:25 mark in the video. The video follows a Middle Eastern theme with Massari and French Montana smoking shishas, various numbers of women wearing Indian garb dancing with a sunlit curtain in the background and a lion. Intercut in the video are scenes of the Palace of Culture and Science from Warsaw, the Burj Al Arab from Dubai and the CN Tower from Toronto set in the nighttime.

== Chart performance ==
The song debuted at number 78 on the week of June 28, 2013. Ten weeks later, it peaked at number 37 on the week of August 24, 2013. It spent a total of 19 weeks on the chart.

Chart (2013)	Peak position
Canada Hot 100 (Billboard)	37

== Certifications ==
Region	Certification	Certified units/sales
Canada (Music Canada)	Gold	40,000^{‡}
^{‡} Sales+streaming figures based on certification alone.
