= Brand New Day (Massari song) =

Single by Massari

from the EP Hero
- Released: July 1, 2012
- Genre: R&B, dance
- Length: 3:21
- Label: CP Records
- Songwriters: Ovidiu Bistriceanu, Wassim Salibi, Ahmad Balshe, Sari Abboud
- Producer: Ovi

Massari singles chronology
"Full Circle" (2012)	"Brand New Day" (2012)	"Shisha" (2013)

Music video
- "Brand New Day" on YouTube

"Brand New Day" is a single by Lebanese Canadian R&B/pop singer Massari released as the second single from his first EP Hero. It was released on July 1st 2012 by CP Records, marking the first official single by Massari with CP in 5 years; the last single with CP was Hero's lead single "Rush the Floor" in 2006 featuring rapper Belly.

== Music video ==
The music video was shot in Miami, Florida and was directed by RT!. It shows Massari with his love interest going round in Miami venues and on boat trips near the Miami coast or shown partying with friends.

== Charts ==
"Brand New Day" has been relatively successful in Billboard Canadian Hot 100 for 20 weeks and reaching number 41.

Many months after its release in Canada, the single became a hit in July 2013 in Germany, Austria and Switzerland.

Chart (2012–2013)	Peak position
Austria (Ö3 Austria Top 40)	28
Canada (Canadian Hot 100)	41
Germany (Media Control Charts)	29
Switzerland (Swiss Hitparade)	24
