= Smile for Me (Massari song) =

Single by Massari featuring Loon

from the album Massari
- Released: January 2005
- Recorded: 2004
- Genre: R&B, Hip hop
- Length: 4:22
- Label: Capital Prophets (CP) Records Inc.
- Songwriters: Ahmed Balshe; Sari Abboud; Chauncey Hawkins
- Producer: Da Heala

Massari singles chronology
"Smile for Me" (2005)	"Be Easy" (2005)

Loon singles chronology
"Show Me Your Soul" (2003)	"Smile for Me" (2005)	"Who Is Dat" (2007)

Music video
- "Smile for Me" on YouTube

"Smile for Me" is a song by R&B singer Massari. It was released in January 2005 as the lead single from his self-titled debut album Massari. It features vocals from rapper Loon.

== Music video ==
A music video was made for the song by RT!. It features Massari and Loon with their love interests with other scenes showing them shopping, flirting and dancing with a number of women. The video features the first verse of "Be Easy" at the end.

== Charts ==
Chart (2005)	Peak position
Canada CHR/Pop Top 30 (Radio & Records)	29
