= Mia Martina (album) =

Studio album by Mia Martina
- Released: October 14, 2014
- Genre: Dance; pop
- Label: CP; Universal Music Canada

Mia Martina chronology
Devotion (2011)	Mia Martina (2014)	Daydream (2019)

Singles from Mia Martina
- 1. "Heartbreaker" Released: February 27, 2013; 2. "La La" Released: June 30, 2013; 3. "Danse" Released: November 9, 2013; 4. "HFH (Heart Fucking Hurts)" Released: September 10, 2014; 5. "Beast" Released: October 16, 2014

Mia Martina is the self-titled second studio album by Canadian singer Mia Martina. It was released on October 14, 2014 in Russia and as a special deluxe edition in Japan on December 10, 2014. Martina sought to make this album more personal than her debut album Devotion, drawing influence from her personal life, friends and trips around the world.

== Background ==
Whereas Martina's debut album achieved moderate success, it spawned three very successful singles: the remix of “Stereo Love” was certified Platinum (over 80,000 units sold), while “Latin Moon” and “Burning” were certified Gold (over 40,000 units sold) by Music Canada. Martina has described her debut album as a dream come true, but wanted to explore a different sound in the second album.

== Development and recording ==
Recording sessions took place in Toronto, Miami, Los Angeles and Moscow. Martina stated in multiple interviews the album is more personal, she had more creative control and co-wrote all but one song in the record.

== Singles ==
In February 2013 “Heartbreaker” was released as the first single from the album. Martina teamed up with Canadian musicians RyanDan and Brad Lamborghini to revitalize her sound. RyanDan and Martina worked together before, the duo being responsible for previous singles “Latin Moon” and “Missing You”. A music video directed by Russel Majik premiered on MSN.ca Entertainment and a francophone rendition (version française) was released a few months later. “Heartbreaker” peaked at number 44 on the Canadian Hot 100, and was nominated for Dance Recording of the Year at the 2014 Juno Awards. “La La...” followed up as a second single in June 2013 and was re-recorded in French as well. "La La..." did not make in to the final track list, but was included in the Russian edition and Japanese edition of the album.

In the summer of 2013 a remix of “Tu me manques” reached number 2 on the Russian Top 100 charts. Although “Tu me manques” alongside its English version “Missing You” were released as singles from her debut album, the success of the song in the Commonwealth of Independent States prompted its inclusion in the Russian edition of the album. Meanwhile, “Cabo” was released promotionally on YouTube in August 2013, but was not included in the record. It is a song about Cabo San Lucas and was co-written by Jenson Vaughan, Chris Fabich and Tobias Zwiefler.

Martina collaborated with American singer Dev in the third single "Danse", released in November 2013. A music video inspired by Studio 54 soon followed. It became a Top 40 success, peaking at number 29 on the Canadian Hot 100 and was certified Gold.

In September 2014 “HFH” (standing for “Heart Fucking Hurts”) was released as the fourth single from the album. A clean version of the song with the line "my heart fucking hurts" replaced with "my heart really hurts" was sent to radios in Canada. On September 16, 2014 "Beast (feat. Waka Flocka)" was released as a countdown single on iTunes.

== Release ==
Mia Martina was released on October 14, 2014 in Russia by First Music Publishing. Its Canadian release was planned for the same day, but it was pushed back. Martina stated there will be "little changes for the better" in the album. A Deluxe Edition of the album was released in Japan on November 19, 2014. The Japanese Edition includes the buzz single "La La...". Mia Martina was finally released in Canada as an EP on April 7, 2015 with nine songs.

== Track listing ==
Canada edition
No.	Title	Writer(s)	Producer(s)	Length
1.	"Prototype"	Martine Johnson; Jessica Sarangay; Amy Kaup; Jarrad Kritzstein	Jarrad K.	4:07
2.	"Danse" (featuring Dev)	Martine Johnson; Devin Star Tailes; Adam Alexander	Alex Vujic	3:38
3.	"Damn"	Martine Johnson; Ava-Mae Curah; Jake Osher; Carolyn Jordan; Alice Sophie Penrose	Roderick Kerr, William Rappaport, Henri Lanz, Snoore Forsgren	3:31
4.	"Heartbreaker"	Martine Johnson, Adam Alexander	Ryan Kowarsky; Daniel Kowarsky; David Knecht	3:19
5.	"Beast" (featuring Waka Flocka Flame)	Martine Johnson; Breyan Isaac; Juaquin Malphurs	Breyan Isaac	3:10
6.	"HFH (Heart Fucking Hurts)"	Martine Johnson; Ovidiu Bistriceanu; Kuizz Shah	Ovidiu Bistriceanu, Roderick Kerr, Snorre Forsgren (Icebird), Matt Wong	3:10
7.	"Global Celebration"	Martine Johnson; Vanya Kechichian; Vartiter Valerie Kechichian	Arthur McArthur, Andrew Papaleo	3:21
8.	"Loving You"	Martine Johnson, Stefan Moessle (Secret Sounds), Ashley Jana, Shawn Lopes, Timothy Inniss, Kurt "Golden Boy" Borst	Kurt "Golden Boy" Borst, Stefan Moessle (Secret Sounds)	3:47
9.	"In Your Arms" (featuring Breyan Isaac)	Johnson; Breyan Isaac; Nicholas Eede; Ovidiu Bistriceanu	Ovidiu Bistriceanu	2:54

Japan deluxe edition
No.	Title	Writer(s)	Producer(s)	Length
1.	"Prototype"	Martine Johnson; Amy Kaup; Jarrad Kritzstein; Jessica Sarangay		4:07
2.	"La La..."	Johnson; Amanda Wilson; William Rappaport; Henri Lanz; Salibi; Carolyn Jordan; Roderick Kerr; Snorre Forsgren	Rappaport, Lanz, Icebird, Kerr	3:37
3.	"In Your Arms" (featuring Breyan Isaac)	Johnson; Breyan Isaac; Nicholas Eede; Ovidiu Bistriceanu	Ovidiu Bistriceanu	2:54
4.	"Danse" (featuring Dev)	Johnson; Adam Alexander; Alex Vujic; Wassim Salibi; Devin Star Tailes	Alex Vujic	3:38
5.	"Global Celebration"	Johnson; Andr; Jeremy t; Vanya Kechichian; Vartiter Valerie Kechichian		3:21
6.	"Damn"	Johnson, Ava-Mae Curah, Henri Lanz, Jake, Roderick Kerr, Snorre Forsgren, William Rappaport, Alice Sophie Penrose, Carolyn Jordan		3:31
7.	"HFH (Heart Fucking Hurts)"	Johnson; Ovidiu Bistriceanu; Snorre Forsgren; Kerr; Olivia Noelle; Salibi; Kuizz Shah; Matt Wong		3:10
8.	"Beast" (featuring Waka Flocka Flame)	Johnson; Breyan Isaac; Juaquin Malphurs; Andre Marshall; Manuel Mercado IV		3:10
9.	"Heartbreaker"	Johnson; Kowarsky; Kowarsky; Salibi; David Knecht; Alexander		3:20
10.	"Loving You"	Ashley Jana; Shawn Lopes; Mia Martina; Kurt Borst (aka Golden Boy); Stefan Moessle (aka Secret Sounds)		3:47
11.	"Voulez-vous"	Benny Andersson, Björn Ulvaeus		3:42
12.	"C'est zéro"	Manuel Tadros		4:07
13.	"I Don't Love You Anymore"	Johnson; Ava-Mae Curah; Alice Sophie Penrose; Carolyn Jordan; Danny Schofield; Jason Quenneville		3:44
14.	"Danse" (Jump Smokers remix; featuring Dev)	Johnson; Adam Alexander; Alex Vujic; Wassim Salibi; Devin Star Tailes	Alex Vujic	3:38
15.	"HFH" (Really Clean Version)	Johnson; Ovidiu Bistriceanu; Snorre Forsgren; Kerr; Olivia Noelle; Salibi; Kuizz Shah; Matt Wong		3:10
16.	"HFH" (Tjo & Yusuke from Blu-Swing remix)	Johnson; Ovidiu Bistriceanu; Snorre Forsgren; Kerr; Olivia Noelle; Salibi; Kuizz Shah; Matt Wong		3:10

Russian edition
No.	Title	Writer(s)	Producer(s)	Length
1.	"Prototype"	Martine Johnson; Amy Kaup; Jarrad Kritzstein; Jessica Sarangay		4:07
2.	"Danse" (featuring Dev)	Johnson; Adam Alexander; Alex Vujic; Wassim Salibi; Devin Star Tailes	Alex Vujic	3:38
3.	"La La..."	Johnson; Amanda Wilson; William Rappaport; Henri Lanz; Salibi; Carolyn Jordan; Roderick Kerr; Snorre Forsgren	Rappaport, Lanz, Icebird, Kerr	3:37
4.	"Tu me manques" (remix)	Ryan Kowarsky; Daniel Kowarsky; Maksim Knecht; Jason Quenneville; Denise Adam; Salibi	Dennonyx	3:51
5.	"C'est zéro"	Manuel Tadros		4:07
6.	"In Your Arms" (featuring Breyan Isaac)	Johnson, Breyan Isaac, Nicholas Eede, Ovidiu Bistriceanu		2:54
7.	"Beast" (featuring Waka Flocka Flame)	Johnson; Breyan Isaac; Juaquin Malphurs; Andre Marshall; Manuel Mercado IV		3:10
8.	"HFH (Heart Fucking Hurts)"	Johnson; Ovidiu Bistriceanu; Snorre Forsgren; Kerr; Olivia Noelle; Salibi; Kuizz Shah; Matt Wong		3:10
9.	"Global Celebration"	Johnson, Andr, Jeremy McArthur, Vanya Kechichian, Vartiter Valerie Kechichian		3:21
10.	"Loving You"	Kurt "Golden Boy" Borst, Ashley Jana, Shawn Lopes, Mia Martina, Kurt "Golden Boy" Borst, Stefan Moessle (Secret Sounds)		3:47
11.	"I Don't Love You Anymore"	Johnson, Ava-Mae Curah, Carolyn Jordan, Alice Sophie Penrose, Danny Schofield, Jason Quenneville		3:44
12.	"Voulez-vous"	Benny Andersson, Björn Ulvaeus		3:42
13.	"Heartbreaker"	Johnson; Kowarsky; Kowarsky; Salibi; David Knecht; Alexander		3:20
14.	"Damn"	Johnson; Ava-Mae Curah; Alice Sophie Penrose; Henri Lanz; Jake; Roderick Kerr; Snorre Forsgren; William Rappaport		3:31
15.	"Missing You"	Kowarsky; Kowarsky; Knecht; Quenneville; Adam; Salibi		3:51

== Release history ==
Region	Date	Format(s)	Label
Russia	October 14, 2014	CD; digital download	First Music Publishing
Canada	April 7, 2015	CD; digital download	CP Records, Universal Music Canada
Japan	December 10, 2014	CD; digital download	Manhattan Records
