= Devotion (Mia Martina album) =

Studio album by Mia Martina
- Released: August 29, 2011
- Recorded: 2010–2011
- Genre: Dance-pop
- Length: 43:11
- Label: CP

Mia Martina chronology
Devotion (2011)	Mia Martina (2014)

Singles from Devotion
- 1. "Stereo Love" Released: August 10, 2010; 2. "Latin Moon" Released: May 10, 2011; 3. "Burning" Released: January 17, 2012; 4. "Go Crazy" Released: May 22, 2012; 5. "Missing You" Released: November 30, 2012; 6. "Stay With Me" Released: December 2, 2012

Devotion is the debut studio album by Canadian singer Mia Martina. The album contains twelve songs and it was released in the United States and Canada on August 29, 2011. Devotion spawned three singles; lead single "Stereo Love" featuring Edward Maya, "Latin Moon", and "Burning" became hits, peaking within the top 30 on the Canadian Hot 100, and "Stereo Love" further peaking inside the top ten. The album peaked at number 77 on the Canadian Albums Chart.

== Track listing ==
No.	Title	Writer(s)	Producer(s)	Length
1.	"Stereo Love" (with Edward Maya)	Ilie Alexandru, Eldar Mansurov, Vika Jigulina	Don Omar	4:07
2.	"Latin Moon"	Adam Alexander, Ryan Kowarsky, Daniel Kowarsky, Alexander Vujic & Wassim Salibi	Alex 'Pilzbury' Vujic	3:44
3.	"Devotion"	Shawn Desman, Alexander, R. Kowarsky, Salibi, D. Kowarsky & Vujic	Alex 'Pilzbury' Vujic and Shawn Desman	4:03
4.	"Missing You"	R. Kowarsky, Salibi, D. Kowarsky, Jason Quenneville, Denise Adam & Maksim Knecht	RyanDan	3:49
5.	"Go Crazy" (featuring Adrian Sina)	Adrian Sina, Martine Johnson, Laura Petrescu & Ovidiu-Dorin Ionescu	Adrian Sina	3:11
6.	"Stay With Me"	Jamie Appleby, Alyssa Reid, Salibi, Vujic & Amir Epstein	Alex 'Pilzbury' Vujic and Epstein	3:29
7.	"In Your Arms" (featuring Jump Smokers and Belly)	Nicholas Eede, Justin M. Roman, Sam V. Garcia, Anthony C. Arzadon, Johnson & Ahmad Balshe	Jump Smokers, Belly	3:22
8.	"Miles Away"	Salibi, Johnson, Ava Mae Curah, Julian Gramma, Vinay Vyas & Jason Quenneville	JGramm	3:53
9.	"Burning"	Ovidiu Bistriceanu, Martine Johnson	Ovi	3:22
10.	"Turn It Up" (featuring Belly and Danny Fernandes)	R. Kowarsky, Salibi, Balshe, D. Kowarsky & Quenneville	RyanDan, Belly	3:06
11.	"Chasing the Rush"	Dee Adam, R. Kowarsky, Salibi, Hussein Hamdan, D. Kowarsky, Maks Knecht & Quenneville	RyanDan	3:23
12.	"Phare de la Lune" (Latin Moon - French version)	Adam Alexander, R. Kowarsky, D. Kowarsky, Vujic & Salibi	Alex 'Pilzbury' Vujic	4:01
