= Be Easy (Massari song) =

Single by Massari

from the album Massari
- Released: April 2005
- Recorded: 2004
- Genre: R&B
- Length: 3:25
- Label: Capital Prophets (CP) Records Inc.
- Songwriter: Sari Abboud
- Producer: Jason "DaHeala" Quenneville

Massari singles chronology
"Smile for Me" (2005)	"Be Easy" (2005)	"Real Love" (2006)

Music video
- "Be Easy" on YouTube

"Be Easy" is a song by Lebanese Canadian R&B singer Massari. It was released in April 2005 from his self-titled debut album Massari.

== Music video ==
A music video was made for the song, which won "Best Pop Video" at the 2006 MuchMusic Video Awards. It features Massari with a yellow Lamborghini with some ladies dancing.

== Charts ==
Chart (2005–2006)	Peak position
Canada CHR/Pop Top 30 (Radio & Records)	7
Germany (GfK)	70
