= The Balkan Girls =

2009 single by Elena Gheorghe

Single by Elena Gheorghe

from the album Te Ador and Disco Romancing
- Released: 6 January 2009
- Genre: Dance-pop
- Length: 2:58
- Label: Cat
- Songwriters: Laurențiu Duță; Alexandru Pelin
- Producers: Ovidiu Bistriceanu; Laurențiu Duță; Daris Mangal

Elena Gheorghe singles chronology
"Până la stele" (2008)	"The Balkan Girls" (2009)	"Disco Romancing" (2010)

Audio sample
- file; help

Eurovision Song Contest 2009 entry
- Country: Romania
- Artist: Elena Gheorghe
- Language: English
- Composers: Laurențiu Duță; Alexandru Pelin
- Lyricists: Laurențiu Duță; Alexandru Pelin

Finals performance
- Semi-final result: 9th
- Semi-final points: 67
- Final result: 19th
- Final points: 40

Entry chronology
- ◄ "Pe-o margine de lume" (2008)
- "Playing with Fire" (2010) ►

"The Balkan Girls" is a song by Romanian singer Elena Gheorghe for a special 2009 edition of her second studio album, Te Ador (2008), and third record, Disco Romancing (2012). It was written by Laurențiu Duță and Alexandru Pelin, while production was handled by Duță, Ovidiu Bistriceanu and Daris Mangal. The song was released on an enhanced CD on 6 January 2009 by Cat Music. "The Balkan Girls" is a folk-influenced dance-pop song whose refrain celebrates the party life of Balkan girls.

It represented Romania in the Eurovision Song Contest 2009 in Moscow after winning on the preselection show Selecția Națională. Gheorghe qualified in ninth place for the Grand Final in Moscow, where she finished 19th with a total of 40 points (one of Romania's lowest scores in the contest). During her iele-inspired, mostly negatively-received show, she performed "The Balkan Girls" accompanied by female background dancers with hair extensions and chopped dresses.

Music critics generally gave the song mixed reviews, praising its beat while criticizing its cheesiness. "The Balkan Girls" fared well commercially, topping the Romanian Nielsen Music Control chart and receiving airplay in Greek, Maltese and Turkish clubs. It was promoted with concerts in Germany, the United Kingdom, the Netherlands and Belgium and a music video released in March 2009. The clip portrayed her in an underground club along with fellow dancers.

== Background and release ==
"The Balkan Girls" was written by Laurențiu Duță and Alexandru Pelin and produced by Duță, Ovidiu Bistriceanu and Daris Mangal. It was released on an enhanced CD on 6 January 2009 by Cat Music in Romania, and was later included on a special 2009 edition of Gheorghe's second studio album, Te Ador (2008), and her third record, Disco Romancing (2012). The song was written for Gheorghe's Eurovision participation after she contacted Duță, who came up with its chorus in one week. "The Balkan Girls" is a folk-influenced dance-pop song. Lyrics from its refrain include: "The Balkan girls, they like to party, like nobody, like nobody".

== Reception and accolades ==
The song received generally positive reviews from music critics. On Eurovision.de, a reviewer called it a hymn for Balkan connections in the Eurovision Song Contest and praised its folk elements and danceability. Uwe Hinrichs, in his book Handbuch der Eurolinguistik (Handbook of Eurolinguistics), cited the song as an example of the word "Balkan" referring to a group of people rather than the geographic region. The Guardian's Heidi Stephens gave it a lukewarm review, calling it "cheesy". In a 2016 Wiwibloggs poll entitled "What is your favourite Eurovision song from Romania?", "The Balkan Girls" finished sixth with over 300 votes.

"The Balkan Girls" had low betting odds before the Eurovision Song Contest, and an editor of the French magazine Pure People wrote that it "does not really stay in the eardrums". However, the song topped the Romanian Nielsen Music Control chart in April 2009 and was played in Greek, Maltese and Turkish clubs. At the 2010 Radio România Actualități Awards, "The Balkan Girls" was nominated in the Pop Song of the Year category.

== Music video and promotion ==
Gheorghe premiered the music video for "The Balkan Girls" during TVR1's Danutz S. R. L. on 15 March 2009, followed by its YouTube release the next day. It was filmed by Dragoș Buliga near bridges in Argeș County and at Bucharest's Silver Church Club. Gheorghe took horseback-riding lessons for the video. Choreography was done by Paul Gheorghe, while Cătălin Enache was hired as a stylist. During the music video, the singer dismounts from a horse, enters an underground club with two females and dances there with fellows. In a version produced for a Women's Day campaign by Radio 21, Gheorghe dances with the station's female employees.

To promote "The Balkan Girls" before the Eurovision Song Contest, Gheorghe began a tour in Berlin in early March 2009 and performed at the ITB Berlin. She was interviewed by the Berlin press, and sent her song to local radio and television stations. The singer performed the song in the United Kingdom, the Netherlands and Belgium before Eurovision, and a number of times after the contest.

== At Eurovision ==
=== National selection ===
On 31 January 2009, the Selecția Națională took place to select the Romanian entrant for the Eurovision Song Contest. "The Balkan Girls" was chosen after votes by a professional jury (12 points) and public televoting (10 points) were tallied, resulting in 22 points. Gheorghe's win was contested by fans of the Romanian rock band Blaxy Girls, who placed second with 18 points for "Dear Mama".

=== In Moscow ===
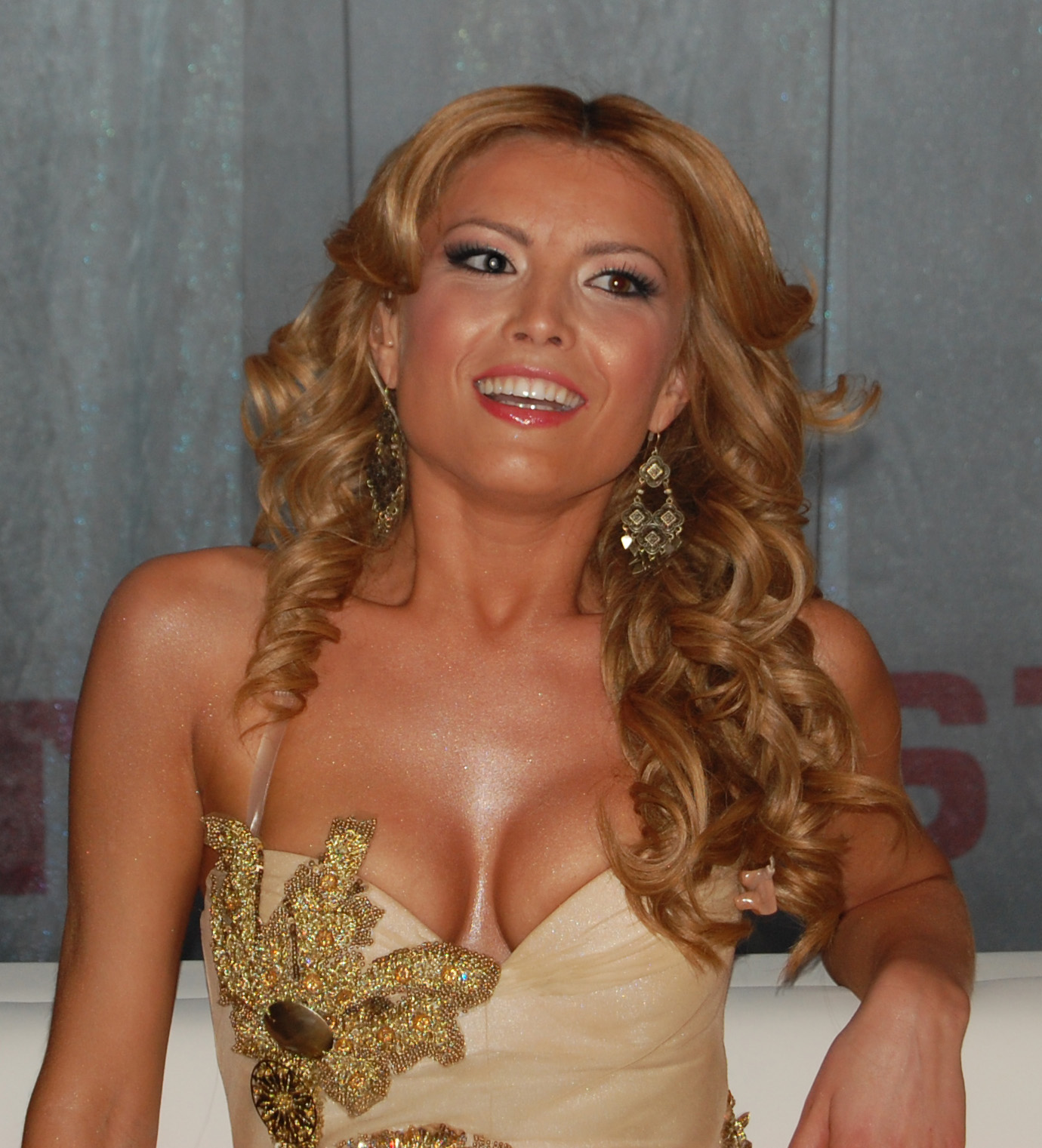
Gheorghe during the Eurovision Song Contest 2009 in Moscow, wearing a flesh-colored dress for her performance.

The Eurovision Song Contest 2009, at the Olympic Indoor Arena in Moscow, consisted of two semi-finals on 12 and 14 May, respectively, and the final on 16 May. According to Eurovision rules, all participating countries except the host country and the "Big Four" (France, Germany, Spain and the United Kingdom) were required to advance from a semi-final to compete in the final; the top ten countries from each semi-finals progressed to the final. Gheorghe performed 14th in the first semi-final, preceded by Macedonia and followed by Finland, and sang 22nd in the Grand Final, preceded by Ukraine and followed by the United Kingdom.

Gheorghe's female dancers from the Selecția Națională also danced in Moscow, and Lucia Dumitrescu provided background vocals. Russian customs officials questioned the purpose of a 100-kilogram (220 lb) fiberglass-and-polyurethane throne used on the show when the singer's entourage brought it into the country. Gheorghe's choreography and graphics were inspired by the iele, feminine creatures in Romanian mythology. About the preparations, the singer said in an interview with EuroVisionary:

I [can] assure [...] that we have contributed with all our forces, imagination, ideas and of course, the talent of people who really know what a "show" means. [...] I wish only that my performance will wake up an optimistic feeling for everybody and want to share my pleasure and love for my music to everybody that is watching the show. If you have managed to convince through interpretation, dance and scenography, then for sure the public and the jury they will appreciate you.

Her performance began with "a cloud of smoke", from which the singer's background dancers emerged in "ropey hair extensions, ronseal tans and shredded mermaid frocks". They rotated what appeared to be a boulder, revealing Ghorghe sitting on a stone-looking throne. She sang "The Balkan Girls" in a flesh-colored dress and 14-centimetre (5.5 in) high heels, accompanied by the dancers. Response to the performance was mainly negative. On Eurovision.de, Stephan Scharr called the singer's delivery "thin" and her performance "colorless and not very spectacular". The Guardian's Stephens likened Gheorghe's appearance to that of British singer Geri Halliwell, and Dana Cobuz of Jurnalul Național compared the background dancers to Ieles. The British press accused Gheorghe of lip synching to "The Balkan Girls", which is forbidden by Eurovision rules.

==== Points awarded to Romania ====
The country finished ninth in the first semi-final with 67 points, including ten from Portugal and eight from Israel. In the Grand Final, Romania reached 19th place with 40 points, including 12 from Moldova and seven from Spain, one of Romania's lowest scores in the contest.

== Track listing ==
- Romanian enhanced CD
1. "The Balkan Girls" (Eurovision version) – 2:58
2. "The Balkan Girls" (David DeeJay Remix) – 4:00
3. "The Balkan Girls" (DJ Daronee Remix) – 3:26
4. 8 JPG image files
5. "The Balkan Girls" (Promotional music video)

== Charts ==
Chart (2009)	Peak position
Romania (Nielsen Music Control)	1

== Release history ==
Country	Date	Format	Label
Romania	6 January 2009	Enhanced CD	Cat

== See also ==
- List of Nielsen Music Control number ones of the 2000s
