= Te Ador =

Studio album by Elena Gheorghe
- Released: July 11, 2008 (Romania)
- Recorded: 2007–2008
- Genre: Latino/Pop
- Length: 37:16 / 49:53 (Special Edition)
- Language: Romanian/English
- Label: Cat Music
- Producer: Laurenţiu Duţă, Ovidiu Bistriceanu, Daris Mangal

Elena Gheorghe chronology
Lilicea Vreariei (2008)	"Te Ador" (2008)	Disco Romancing (2012)

Te Ador: Special Edition
- Special Edition Cover

Singles from Te Ador
- 1. "Te Ador" Released: 2008; 2. "Pana la stele" Released: 2008; 3. "The Balkan Girls" Released: 2009

Te Ador is the second solo studio album by Romanian singer Elena Gheorghe. It was released in July 2008 in Romania and features the singles "Te Ador" (I Love You) & "Până La Stele" (Up To The Stars). A repackaged "Special Edition" was released in May 2009 featuring the single "The Balkan Girls", Elena's entry in the 2009 Eurovision Song Contest.

== Track list ==
Standard Edition:

1. "Te Ador" 03:43 (composition Laurenţiu Duţă/Ovidiu Bistriceanu/Daris Mangal; music-line Laurenţiu Duţă, Ovidiu Bistriceanu)
2. "O Nouă Viaţă" 03:27 (composition Laurenţiu Duţă/Ovidiu Bistriceanu/Daris Mangal; music-line Laurenţiu Duţă, Ovidiu Bistriceanu)
3. "Jumătate" 03:55 (composition & music-line Adi Cristescu)
4. "Până La Stele" 03:36 (composition Laurenţiu Duţă/Ovidiu Bistriceanu/Daris Mangal; music-line Laurenţiu Duţă, Ovidiu Bistriceanu/Dorin Topală)
5. "Tot Ce Vreau" 03:46 (composition Adi Cristescu; music-line Adi Cristescu/Remus Petruţ)
6. "Spune-Mi" 03:24 (composition & music-line Adi Cristescu/ Florian Ghiurluc)
7. "Lângă Mine" 03:08 (composition Gabriel Huiban/Adi Colceru; music-line Alex Pelin)
8. "Promisiuni" 03:10 (composition Laurenţiu Duţă/Ovidiu Bistriceanu/Daris Mangal; music-line Laurenţiu Duţă, Ovidiu Bistriceanu)
9. "Zile Şi Nopti" 03:17 (composition Laurenţiu Duţă/Ovidiu Bistriceanu/Daris Mangal; music-line Laurenţiu Duţu, Ovidiu Bistriceanu/Dorin ţopală)
10. "My Superstar" 04:00 (composition Adi Cristescu/Constinel Ghiorghiulescu; music-line Adi Cristescu/Ciro de Luca)
11. "I Love You" 03:50 (composition & music-line Ionuţ Radu)

Special Edition (Editie Speciala):

1. "The Balkan Girls" 02:49 (Duţă/Bistriceanu/Mangal - Duţă & Pelin)
2. "The Balkan Girls (David Dee Jay Club Remix)" 04:02 (Duţă/Bistriceanu/Mangal - Duţă & Pelin)
3. "The Balkan Girls (DJ Daronee Remix) 03:28 (Duţă/Bistriceanu/Mangal - Duţă & Pelin)
4. "Te Ador" 03:43 (Duţă/Bistriceanu/Mangal - Duţă)
5. "O Nouă Viaţă" 03:27 (Duţă/Bistriceanu/Mangal - Duţă)
6. "Jumătate" 03:55 (Cristescu)
7. "Până La Stele" 03:36 (Duţă/Bistriceanu/Mangal - Duţă/Topală)
8. "Tot Ce Vreau" 03:46 (Cristescu - Cristescu/Petruţ)
9. "Spune-Mi" 03:24 (Cristescu/Ghiurluc)
10. "Lângă Mine" 03:08 (Huiban/Colceru - Pelin)
11. "Promisiuni" 03:10 (Duţă/Bistriceanu/Mangal - Duţă)
12. "Zile Şi Nopti" 03:17 (Duţă/Bistriceanu/Mangal - Duţă/Topală)
13. "My Superstar" 04:00 (Cristescu/Ghiorghiulescu - Cristescu/ Ciro de Luca)
14. "I Love You" 03:50 (Radu)
15. "Te Ador" (Video)
