= Mia Martina =

Canadian singer and songwriter

- Born: Martine Johnson; January 14, 1988 (age 38)
- Origin: Saint-Ignace, New Brunswick, Canada
- Genres: Pop; dance-pop; reggaeton; Europop
- Occupations: Singer, songwriter
- Years active: 2009–present
- Label: CP Music Group
- Website: www.miamartina.com

Martine Johnson, better known by her stage name Mia Martina, is a Canadian singer and songwriter. She is known for her hit singles "Stereo Love", "Burning", "Latin Moon" and "Beast". Martina has received Juno Awards nominations for "Stereo Love" and "HeartBreaker", as well as a SOCAN award in 2014 for co-writing "Burning".

== Biography ==
Martine Johnson grew up in Saint-Ignace, New Brunswick and is fluent in both French and English, thanks to her father's heritage. At age 18, Johnson moved to Ottawa, Ontario to attend Carleton University. During her time there, she stumbled upon an internship opportunity at CP Music Group which marked the beginning of her music career.

== Musical career ==
Johnson's first single release was a cover version of Edward Maya and Vika Jigulina's "Stereo Love". It reached number 10 in the Billboard Canadian Hot 100 in November 2010. To date, "Stereo Love" has reached platinum sales and earned a nomination for Dance Single of the Year at the 2011 Juno Awards. In late 2010, Don Omar collaborated with Johnson to release a remix version of "Stereo Love". The singer followed up with "Latin Moon" in May 2011, a song which reached gold sales and was re-released in French and Spanish. The single also saw a fourth release featuring Massari. The original version was nominated in the Dance/Urban/Rhythmic category at the 2012 Canadian Radio Music Awards.

Johnson's debut album Devotion was released on August 29, 2011 and reached number 77 on the Canadian Albums Chart. The album earned nominations for Dance Recording of the Year at the 2012 Juno Awards and World Recording of the Year at the 2012 East Coast Music Awards. Two more singles were released off Devotion, "Burning", "Go Crazy" (produced by Adrian Sina of the group Akcent) and "Missing You".

Johnson made a comeback with her song "Different Kind of Love", as well as her other songs that later came in the fall: "DJ Saved My Life", a remix of the Mariah Carey song of the same name, and "Daydream".

== Discography ==
=== Albums ===
Title	Details	Peak chart positions
Title	Details	CAN
Devotion	Released: 29 August 2011; Label: CP Records, Universal Music Canada; Format: Digital download, CD	77
Mia Martina	Released: 14 October 2014; Label: CP Records, Universal Music Canada; Format: Digital download, CD	—
Daydream	Released: 22 November 2019; Label: Independent; Format: Digital download	—

=== Singles ===
Year	Title	Peak chart positions			Certifications	Album
Year	Title	CAN	US Dance	RUS	Certifications	Album
2010	"Stereo Love" (with Edward Maya)	10	—	—	CAN: 3× Platinum	Devotion
2011	"Latin Moon"	30	—	—	CAN: Platinum	Devotion
2012	"Burning"	25	—	186	CAN: Gold	Devotion
2012	"Go Crazy" (featuring Adrian Sînă)	—	—	—		Devotion
2012	"Missing You"	—	—	2		Devotion
2013	"HeartBreaker"	44	25	—	CAN: Gold	Mia Martina
2013	"La La..."	68	45	159		Mia Martina
2013	"Danse" (featuring Dev)	29	38	—	CAN: Gold	Mia Martina
2014	"HFH"	91	—	—		Mia Martina
2014	"Beast" (featuring Waka Flocka Flame)	39	—	—	CAN: Platinum	Mia Martina
2014	"C'est zéro"	—	—	126		Mia Martina
2017	"Sooner or Later" (featuring Kent Jones)	—	—	—	CAN: Gold	Single Non-album
2019	"DJ Saved My Life" (featuring Breikthru)	—	—	—		
2019	"Daydream"	—	—	—		
2019	"Worst in Me"	—	—	—		
2020	"What I Want"(with Huu Banga Production)	—	—	—		
2020	"Latin Moon" Remix (with Jyye)	—	—	—		
2020	"Chanter Noël"(with Sabrina Sabatage)	—	—	—		
2021	"Without You"	—	—	—		
2022	"Tu Me Manques" "Franchise Version"	—	—	—		
