= Ecou =

Single by Elena Gheorghe featuring Glance
- Released: 1 February 2013
- Genre: pop, electropop, R&B
- Length: 3:58
- Label: Roton Records, Cat Music; Ultra (United States)
- Songwriter(s): Laurenţiu Duţă, Ovidiu Bistriceanu
- Producer(s): Laurenţiu Duţă

Elena Gheorghe featuring Glance singles chronology
"De Crăciun" (2012)	"Ecou" (2013)	"Până Dimineața" (2013)

"Ecou" (Romanian for Echo) is a song recorded by Romanian recording artist Elena Gheorghe and featuring rapper Glance. The song was released as the lead single from Gheorghe's forthcoming untitled bilingual album. Musically, the song is a pop tune, which is influenced by genres such as electropop and R&B/soul. Lyrically, "Ecou" is a love song which speaks of woman unable to move on over a past romantic relationship. The song is entirely written and performed in Romanian, following the new wave of popular Romanian musical compositions sung in the native language. The single was an overwhelming success for the pair.

A music video was commissioned for the song. Elena Gheorghe performed the song during many live appearances, as well as on her nationwide tour during February and March 2013.

The song was chosen as the best Romanian song in 2013.

== Charts ==
=== Weekly charts ===
Chart (2013)	Peak position
Moldova (Moldova Radio Airplay)	3
Moldova (Moldova TV Airplay)	4
Romania (Airplay 100)	1
Romania (Romanian Radio Airplay)	1
Romania (Romania TV Airplay)	1

=== Year-end charts ===
Chart (2013)	Peak position
Moldova (Media Forest)	16
Romania (Airplay 100)	1
Romania (Media Forest)	1
Chart (2014)	Peak position
Romania (Media Forest)	53
Chart (2015)	Peak position
Romania (Media Forest)	85

== See also ==
- List of Airplay 100 number ones of the 2010s
