= Elena Gheorghe =

Romanian singer (born 1985)

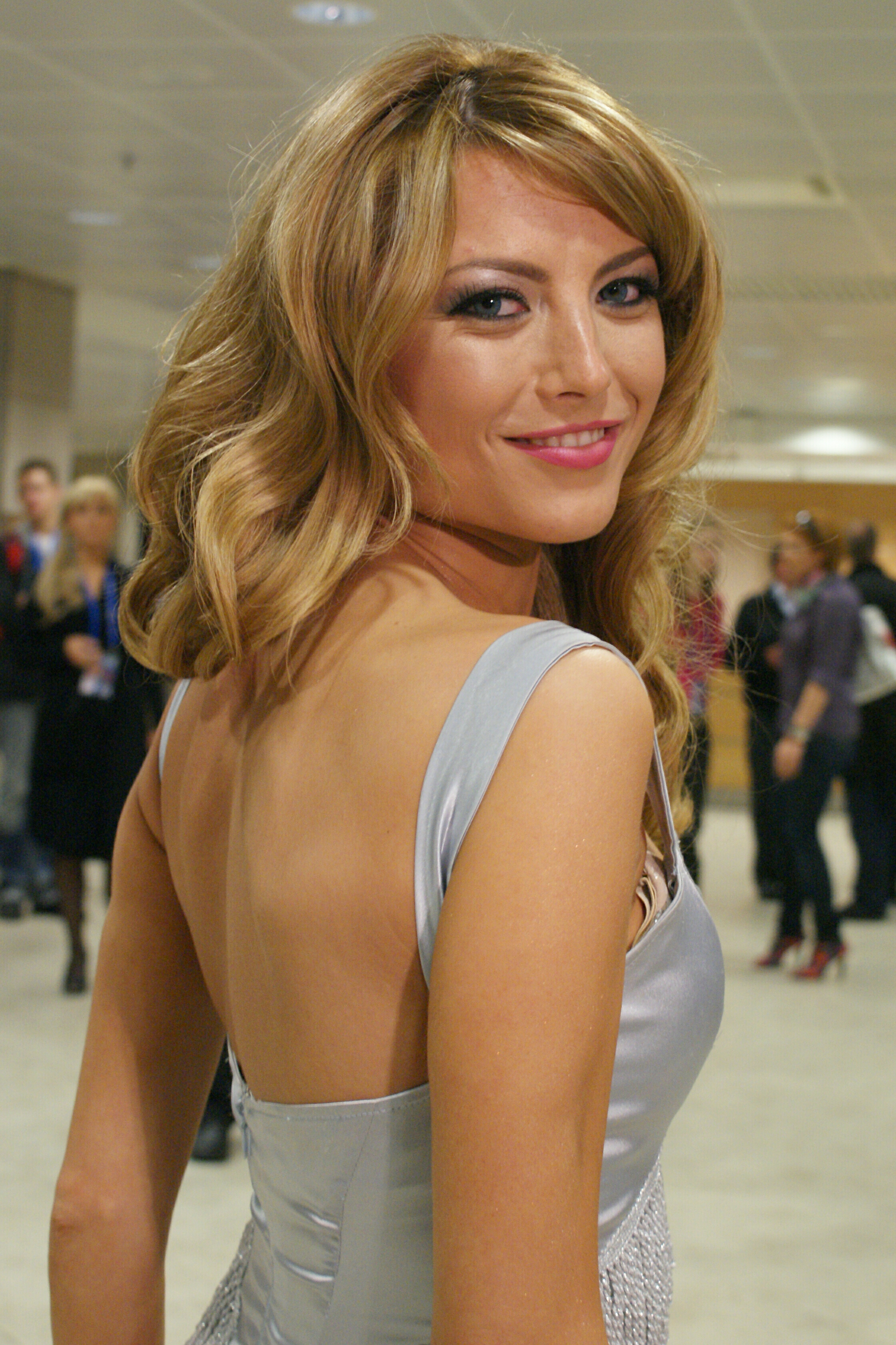
- Gheorghe attending a meeting in Moscow after the Eurovision Song Contest 2009 semi-final

Background information
- Born: 30 July 1985 (age 41)
- Origin: Bucharest, Romania
- Genres: Pop, dance, house
- Occupation: Singer
- Labels: Cat Music, Major, Roton Music
- Formerly of: Mandinga
- Spouse: Cornel Ene
- Website: elenagheorghe.ro

Elena Gheorghe (born 30 July 1985; Romanian pronunciation: [eˈle.na ˈɡe̯orɡe]) is a Romanian singer. In the first half of the 2000s, she joined the Romanian pop group Mandinga, with whom she released two albums. In 2006, she left the group and pursued a solo career. She has released three studio albums and one compilation album. She scored a top ten hit in the Romanian Top 100 with her debut single, "Vocea Ta".

== Early life and career beginnings ==
Gheorghe was born in Bucharest to the family of an Aromanian priest, Gheorghe Gheorghe. Many of her ancestors were Orthodox priests. She has a sister, Ana, who is a journalist and a brother, Costin, a former footballer. Her mother, Mărioara Gheorghe, is a folk artist. Gheorghe debuted on the folk music scene at the age of three with the song Sus în Deal în Poieniţă. At the age of 11, she joined the Children's National Palace, where she received singing lessons. In 2000, she won the gold trophy Little Bear (in Baia Mare) with One Moment In Time by Whitney Houston. In 2001, she participated in the Mamaia Festival.

Gheorghe is of both Romanian and Aromanian background.

== Career ==
=== 2002–2005: Career as part of Mandinga ===
Gheorghe started singing with Mandinga, a very successful band in the Latino genre, in early 2003. In June of that year, Mandinga released their first album, ...De Corazón. Mandinga was placed 4th in the Romanian National Eurovision Selection in March 2005 with the song My Sun, which was awarded a golden disc one year later. In January 2006, she opened her dance school, Passitos, and a month later ended her collaboration with Mandinga, starting her solo career with the help of musical producer Laurenţiu Duţă.

=== 2006–2008: Solo career beginnings ===
In June 2006, Gheorghe released her first solo album, entitled Your Voice. In March 2007, Gheorghe won the Radio România Actualitaţi prize for the best performing act of 2006 and was nominated for the Best Song of 2006 category with the song Your Voice. In August 2007, at the Romanian Top Hit Music Awards, Gheorghe won the award for Best Song of 2007 for the song Your Brown Eyes. Some of her songs are sung in the Aromanian language, such as Ma ţi s-adar, Lilicea Vreariei, and others.

In 2007, she released her second solo album Te Ador, with the title trackalso becoming a hit.

=== 2009: Eurovision Song Contest ===
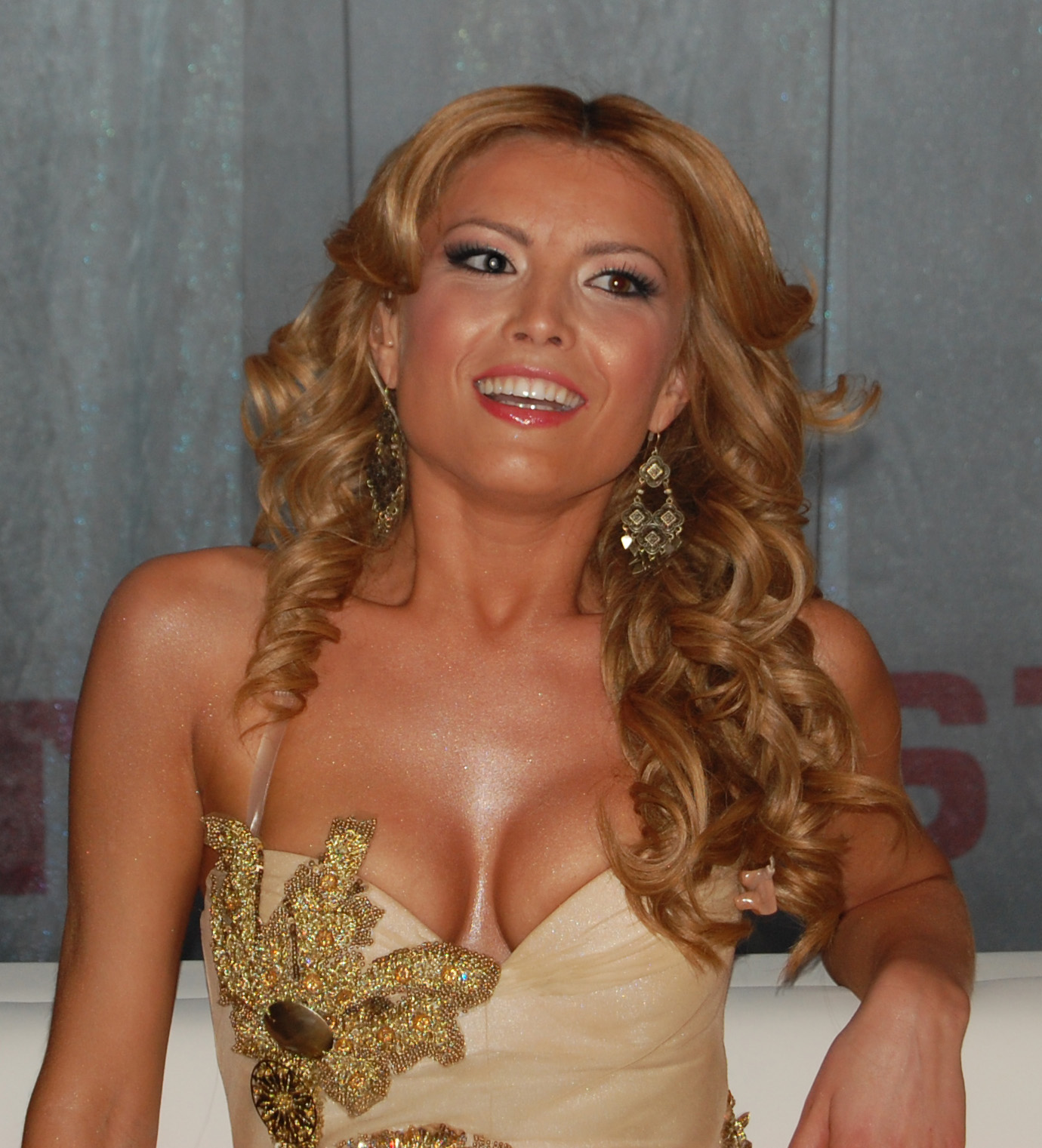
Gheorghe at the ESC 2009

In late 2008, songwriter Laurenţiu Duţă offered Gheorghe a song to submit in the Romanian pre-selection for the Eurovision Song Contest. Around 31 December 2008, it was announced that Gheorghe was one of 24 semi-finalists. She competed in the semi-final and then passed to the National Final on 31 January 2009. There, she came second after televoting, but the jury helped her win the selection, thus representing Romania in the Eurovision Song Contest 2009 with the song "The Balkan Girls." She embarked on a promotional tour throughout Europe from February to May.

The song was performed in the second half of the first semifinal on 12 May in Moscow, where it came ninth with 67 points. She proceeded to the Grand Final on 16 May. There she performed the 22nd song of the evening, and Gheorghe presented a concept show about wooden fairies called Iele in Romania. She came 19th that night, gaining 40 points, including 12 points from Moldova, seven from Spain, and five from Turkey and Macedonia, etc.

=== 2010–2012: European recognition and "Disco Romancing" ===
After Eurovision, she gained more fame across Europe and released her single "Disco Romancing," which became a smash hit in Romania, a top-ten hit in Hungary, and a moderate success in the Czech Republic, Netherlands, Poland, and Slovakia. The following single, "Midnight Sun," was a top-ten success in the Dutch Top 40 and the Romanian Top 100. In 2011, she collaborated with Dony and released the single "Hot Girls," which once again charted throughout Europe. The same year, she embarked on her first European tour to Germany, Spain and Greece. Gheorghe's album, "Disco Romancing," was released in a limited edition in 2012 in Spain and Japan. The album spawned 3 more singles, "Your Captain Tonight," "Amar Tu Vida," and "Hypnotic."

=== 2013–present ===
In 2016, Disney Enterprises and Walt Disney Romania selected the artist to be part of an animated TV Series produced by Disney, and she sings the main theme from Elena of Avalor.

In 2019, to celebrate the Aromanian National Day (celebrated on 23 May), Gheorghe organized an Aromanian music event.

In March 2022, she released a new song called "Brațele."

== Discography ==
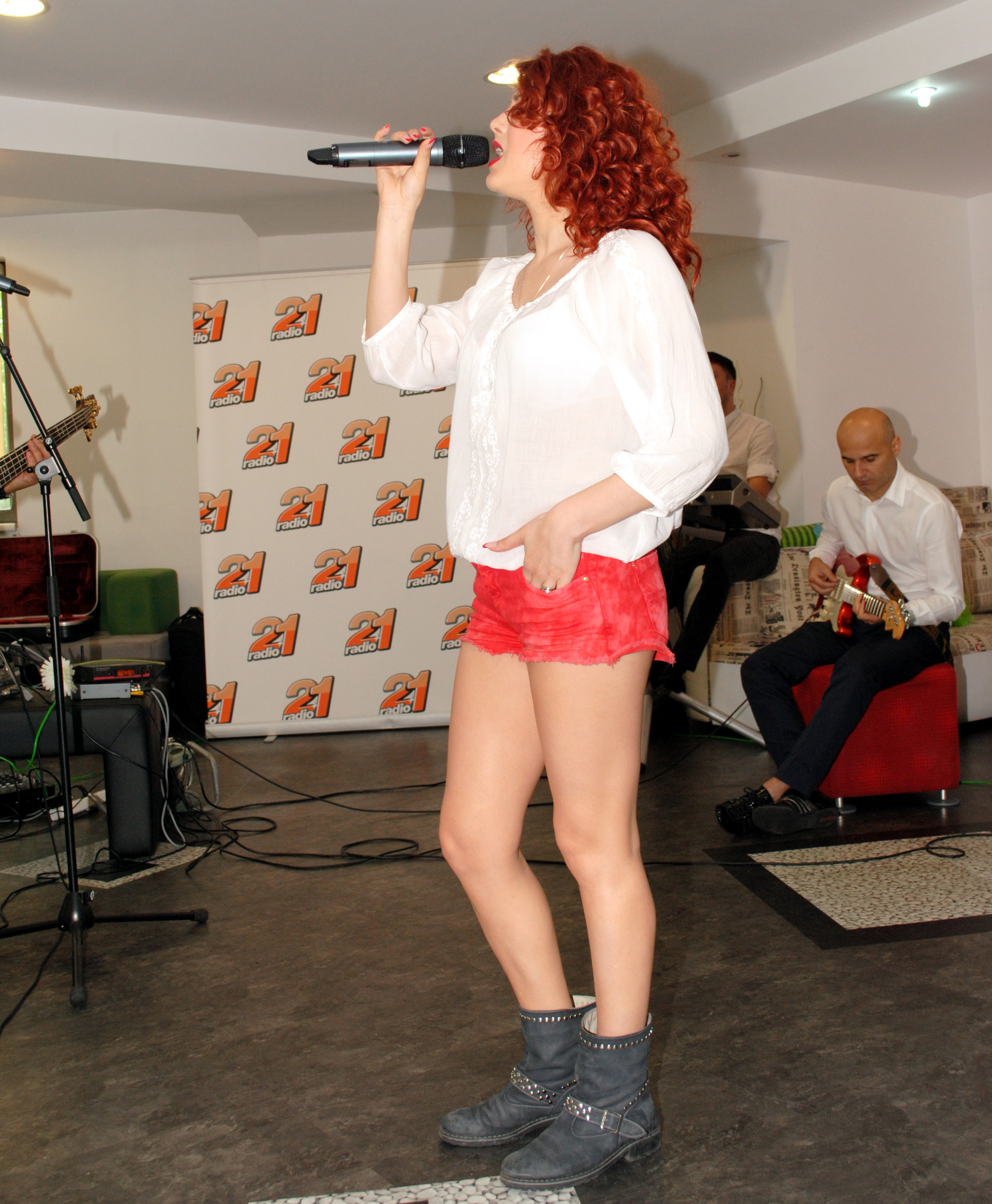
Gheorghe performing in 2013

=== Studio albums ===
- 2006: Vocea Ta
- 2008: Te Ador
- 2012: Disco Romancing
- 2019: Lunâ Albâ
- 2025: Crăciunul E Iubire

=== As part of Mandinga ===
- 2003: ...de corazôn
- 2005: Soarele Meu

=== Compilations ===
- 2008: Lilicea Vreariei
  (Elena Gheorghe & Gică Coadă)

=== Singles ===
Song	Year	Peak chart positions									Album
Song	Year	AUT	GER	HUN	CZR	ROM	NLD	UK	SVK	SPA	Album
"Vocea Ta"	2006	—	—	—	—	8	—	—	—	—	Vocea Ta
"Ochii Tăi Căprui"	2007	—	—	—	—	21	—	—	—	—	Vocea Ta
"Te Ador"	2008	—	—	—	—	—	—	—	—	—	Te Ador
"Până La Stele"	2008	—	—	—	—	—	—	—	—	—	Te Ador
"The Balkan Girls"	2009	—	—	—	—	1	—	172	—	—	Te Ador
"Disco Romancing"	2010	—	—	3	12	1	59	199	24	—	Disco Romancing
"Midnight Sun"	2010	—	—	—	—	5	21	—	61	—	Disco Romancing
"Hot Girls" (with Dony)	2011	71	91	—	—	30	—	—	36	—	Disco Romancing
"Your Captain Tonight"	2011	—	—	—	—	94	95	—	—	—	Disco Romancing
"Amar Tu Vida"	2012	—	—	—	—	47	—	—	—	—	Disco Romancing
"Hypnotic"	2012	—	—	—	—	—	—	—	—	—	Disco Romancing
"Ecou" (featuring Glance)	2013	—	—	—	—	1	—	—	—	—	non-album single
"Până Dimineață" (featuring JJ)	2013	—	—	—	—	—	—	—	—	—	non-album single
"Mamma Mia (He's Italiano)" (featuring Glance)	2014	—	—	—	—	—	—	—	—	—	non-album single
"Senor Loco" (featuring Danny Mazo)	2015	—	—	—	—	—	—	—	—	—	non-album single
"Autograf"	2015	—	—	—	—	—	—	—	—	—	non-album single
"Lunâ Albâ"	2018	—	—	—	—	—	—	—	—	—	Lunâ Albâ
"Steaua imshata"	2019	—	—	—	—	—	—	—	—	—	Lunâ Albâ
"Brațele"	2022	—	—	—	—	—	—	—	—	—	Brațele
"—" denotes a title that did not chart, or was not released in that territory.

== See also ==
- List of music released by Romanian artists that has charted in major music markets

Preceded by Nico and Vlad with "Pe-o margine de lume"	Romania in the Eurovision Song Contest; 2009	Succeeded by Paula Seling and Ovi with "Playing with Fire"
