= Massari =

Lebanese-Canadian singer and songwriter (born 1980)

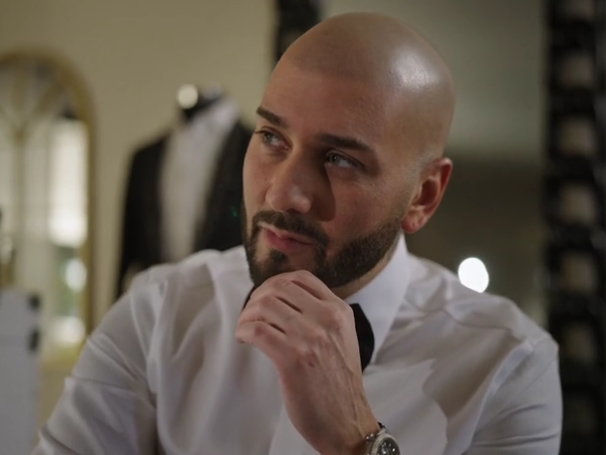

Background information
- Born: Sari Abboud; December 10, 1980 (age 45); Beirut, Lebanon
- Origin: Ottawa, Ontario, Canada
- Genres: R&B; pop; hip-hop; crunk; dance
- Occupations: Singer; songwriter
- Instruments: Vocals; keyboard
- Years active: 2001–present
- Labels: Universal Music; SAL&CO
- Website: www.massarionline.com

Sari Abboud (Arabic: ساري عبّود; born December 10, 1980), better known by his stage name Massari (/məˈsɑːri/ mə-SAR-ee), is a Lebanese-Canadian singer and songwriter. He began his career in the early 2000s and went on to release two R&B albums, Massari (2005) and Forever Massari (2009), before releasing two pop EPs, Hero (2015) and Tune In (2018). He is managed by SAL&CO.

== Early life and education ==
Sari Abboud was born in Beirut, Lebanon. His family relocated to Montreal, Quebec when he was 11 years old. At the age of 13, he and his younger brothers moved to Ottawa, Ontario, where he attended Hillcrest High School. At age 13 he performed at a school talent show which was the first time he wanted to pursue that as his career.

== Career ==
He started his musical career in 2001-2002 adopting the stage name Massari, a reference to his first name Sari and the Lebanese Arabic slang مصاري maṣāri meaning "money". He released his first song "Spitfire" (2002) which was aired on Ottawa radio stations.

=== 2005–2007: Debut self-titled album and success with CP Records ===
After three years of preparation, he released a self-titled album Massari on CP Records. His debut album resulted in four singles, receiving Gold certification in Canada, and he continued to have international success in Europe, Asia, the Middle East. Two of his early singles "Be Easy" and "Real Love" besides being two of his major hits in Canada, cracking the Canadian Top 10, they also charted notably in the German Singles Chart. Based on his initial success, Massari signed a record deal with independent record label, CP Records, becoming the prominent successful performing artist for the record company alongside rapper Belly. On November 14, 2007, Massari and his record label, CP Records, came to a mutual agreement to end their relationship.

=== 2009–2010: Forever Massari and signing with Universal ===
During 2009, he released two tracks from the forthcoming album, namely "Bad Girl" and "Body Body". The album itself Forever Massari was officially released on Universal Records Canada on 10 November 2009. It included songs by writers and producers like Rupert Gayle, Alex Greggs, Derek Brin, Rob Wells and Justin Forsley.

=== 2011–2013: Signing again with CP and Hero EP ===
In summer of 2011, Massari signed again with CP Records, after five years of his departure from the label. On June 20, 2012, Massari realized there was money to be made off of the Middle Eastern ethnic audience, and released a free single called "Full Circle" featuring Belly as the lead single from his first EP Hero. Massari's second single for the EP, called "Brand New Day", was released on July 1, 2012 (Canada Day). Massari shot the video in Miami with Canadian director RT!. In January 2013, "Brand New Day" went Gold in Canada. It also charted on the Austrian Ö3 Austria Top 40, German Media Control Charts and Swiss Hitparade. The third single from the EP, "Shisha", features French Montana. It was released on May 21, 2013.

=== 2017–present: Tune In ===
On March 24, 2017, Massari released a brand new song "So Long" along with a music video featuring former Miss Universe Pia Wurtzbach. It is the first single from his second EP Tune In. The album contains features from Mohammed Assaf, Tory Lanez, Beenie Man, Shaggy, Afrojack and producer DaHeala. On March 31, 2017, a follow-up single "Done Da Da" was released along with a music video which received over 7.2 million views within 3 weeks on Vevo.

In 2024, Massari, Future, and Mohamed Ramadan released the WWE Crown Jewel theme song, "Arabi".

== Artistry ==
=== Influences ===
He has been exposed to a wide variety of music styles. He says his biggest influence is George Wassouf Massari says, "I sing from my heart and George Wassouf taught me to do that." Many of Massari's songs are influenced by his Middle-Eastern origins. Most of his songs contain Middle-Eastern Arabic melodies. Massari says, "Because of my background, my music is heavily influenced by Middle-Eastern melodies. Over the past few years so many artists are trying to bring Arabic styles into their music, but mine is authentic." Massari sings and raps about women. "My music is made for the ladies because that's where I get my inspiration. You'll notice a lot of the music is upbeat and positive. Women give off so much energy; it's hard not to be inspired by them."

=== Music style ===
A large portion of Massari's work incorporates elements of both singing and rapping, depending on whether or not another artist is featured on the track. Overall, Massari incorporates elements of R&B, hip hop, and pop in his music.

== Personal life ==
Massari is fluent in English, Arabic and French.

In 2021 he proposed to his longtime partner, Sahar Golestani; the pair were married in Los Angeles in 2023.

== Discography ==
=== Studio albums ===
List of studio albums, with selected chart positions, sales figures and certifications
Title	Album details	Peak chart positions	Certifications
Title	Album details	CAN	Certifications
Massari	Released: May 31, 2005; Label: CP Records; Formats: CD, digital download	29	MC: Gold
Forever Massari	Released: November 10, 2009; Label: Universal Music Canada; Formats: CD, digital download	—	
"—" denotes an album that did not chart or was not released.

=== Extended plays ===
Title	EP details
Hero	Released: May 17, 2015; Label: CP Music Group; Format: CD, Digital download
Tune In	Released: July 20, 2018; Label: Massari & Co.; Formats: CD, digital download

=== DVDs ===
- 2006: Massari: Road to Success

=== Singles ===
Year	Title	Peak chart positions							Certifications	Album
Year	Title	CAN	AUT	GER	POR	SWI	ROM	LEB	Certifications	Album
2005	"Smile for Me" (feat. Loon)	18	—	—	12	—	—	—		Massari
2005	"Be Easy"	4	—	70	16	—	—	—		Massari
2006	"Real Love"	9	—	48	48	—	—	—		Massari
2006	"Rush the Floor" (feat. Belly)	—	—	—	—	—	—	—		Massari
2008	"Say You Love Me"	—	—	—	—	—	—	—		non-album singles
2008	"In Love Again"	—	—	—	—	—	—	—		non-album singles
2009	"Bad Girl"	77	—	—	—	—	—	—		Forever Massari
2009	"Body Body"	81	—	—	81	—	—	—		Forever Massari
2010	"Under the Radar"	—	—	—	—	—	—	—		Forever Massari
2011	"Dance for Your Life"	—	—	—	—	—	—	—		non-album single
2012	"Full Circle" (feat. Belly)	—	—	—	—	—	—	—		Hero
2012	"Brand New Day"	41	26	29	24	24	—	—	MC: Gold	Hero
2013	"Shisha" (feat. French Montana)	37	—	—	37	—	—	—	MC: Gold	Hero
2014	"What About the Love" (feat. Mia Martina)	—	—	—	—	—	—	—		Hero
2017	"So Long"	—	—	—	—	—	—	7		Tune In
2017	"Done Da Da"	—	—	—	21	—	15	15		Tune In
2017	"Number One" (feat. Tory Lanez)	—	—	81	—	—	—	20		Tune In
2018	"Roll with It" (with Mohammed Assaf)	—	—	—	—	—	—	1		Tune In
2018	"Why" (with Shaggy)	—	—	—	—	—	—	—		Tune In
2018	"Tune In" (feat. Afrojack & Beenie Man)	—	—	—	—	—	—	—		Tune In
2018	"Ya Nour El Ein" (feat. Maya Diab & French Montana)	—	—	—	—	—	—	1		non-album singles
2019	"Albeh Nkasar"	—	—	—	—	—	—	14		non-album singles
2020	"I See the Dream (Badna Salam)" (with Ali Gatie)	—	—	—	—	—	—	1		non-album singles
2021	"Be Mine"	—	—	—	—	—	—	—		non-album singles
"—" denotes a single that did not chart or was not released.

=== Guest appearances ===
List of non-single guest appearances, with other performing artists, showing year released and album name
Title	Year	Album
"Soul on Fire" (KMC ft. Beenie Man & Massari)	2006	Soul on Fire
"Ya Dunya" (Belly ft. Massari)	2007	The Revolution
"Latin Moon" (Mia Martina ft. Massari)	2011	Devotion
"That Kinda Love" (Sol City ft. Massari)	2011	non-album single
"La noche entera" (Pachanga ft. Massari)	2015	La era positiva
"Sherazade" (Kurdo ft. Massari)	2016	Verbrecher aus der Wüste
"Asheghet Manam" (Tohi ft. Massari)	2018	non-album single
"Ana Lahale" (Elyanna ft. Massari)	2020	Elyanna
"Arabi" (Mohamed Ramadan ft. Future & Massari)	2024	non-album single

== Awards and nominations ==
Award	Date	Category	Nominee	Result
MuchMusic Video Awards	June 19, 2005	Best Independent Video	Massari ft. Loon – "Smile For Me"	Nominated
MuchMusic Video Awards	June 19, 2005	Best Rap Video	Massari ft. Loon – "Smile For Me"	Nominated
Canadian Urban Music Awards	November 29, 2005	R&B/Soul Recording of the Year	Massari	Nominated
Canadian Urban Music Awards	November 29, 2005	Best New Artist	Massari	Nominated
MuchMusic Video Awards	June 18, 2006	People's Choice: Favourite Canadian Artist	Massari – "Real Love"	Nominated
MuchMusic Video Awards	June 18, 2006	Best Pop Video	Massari – "Be Easy"	Won
MuchMusic Video Awards	June 18, 2006	Best Independent Video	Massari – "Be Easy"	Nominated
MuchMusic Video Awards	June 18, 2006	Best Cinematography	Massari – "Be Easy"	Nominated
Juno Awards	April 2, 2006	R&B/Soul Recording of the Year	Massari	Nominated
SiriusXM Indie Awards	March 22, 2013	Dance Artist or Group of the Year	Massari	Won
SiriusXM Indie Awards	May 10, 2014	Must Follow Artist of the Year	Massari	Nominated
Murex d'Or	September 3, 2014		Massari	Won

== Citations ==
- Ottawa Citizen: "Back with a splash: Rebuilding the Massari empire"
- BlackBeatsFM Interview with Massari (German)
- Star Phoenix: Rebuilding Massari empire
- PlanetUrban (Australia) interview with Massari
- Naked Eye video interview with Massari
