= CP Music Group =

- Founded: 2002
- Founder: Wassim "SAL" Slaiby; Belly
- Distributors: Universal Music Group; Roc Nation
- Genre: Hip hop; pop; dance
- Country of origin: Canada
- Location: Toronto, Ontario; Los Angeles, California
- Official website: cpmusicgroup.com

CP Music Group is a collaborative music label and management team for a roster of artists, songwriters and producers. It was co-founded in 2002 as Capital Prophets Records by Lebanese-Canadian entrepreneur Wassim "SAL" Slaiby and Palestinian-Canadian songwriter Belly.

== CP Music Group releases ==
=== Albums ===
- Massari - Massari (2006, debut album)
- Belly - The Revolution (2007, debut album)
- Danny Fernandes - Intro (2008, debut album)
- Danny Fernandes - AutomaticLUV (2010, second album)
- Mia Martina - Devotion (2011, debut album)
- Belly - Sleepless Nights 1.5 (2012, second album)
- Danny Fernandes - Breathe Again (2013, third album)
- Mia Martina - Mia Martina (2014, second album)

=== Mixtapes ===
- Belly - DBD Vol. 1 (feat. DJ Kool Kid)
- Belly - DBD Vol. 2 (feat. DJ Slay Kay)
- Belly - DBD Vol. 3 (feat. Big Mike)
- Belly - Hate Me Now or Love Me Forever Vol. 1
- Belly - Back For the First Time Vol. 1 (feat. DJ Smallz)
- Belly - Sleepless Nights (feat. DJ Ill Will)
- Belly & Kurupt - The Lost Tapes 2008 (feat. DJ Ill Will)
- Belly - The Greatest Dream I Never Had (feat. DJ Drama)

=== DVDs ===
- Massari - Road to Success

=== Singles ===
Year	Performer	Single	Chart	Peak Position
2005	Massari	"Smile for Me" (feat. Loon)	BDS Canadian Top 40 chart	18
2005	Massari	"Be Easy"	Canadian Singles Chart; German Singles Chart	4; 70
2006	Massari	"Real Love"	Canadian Singles Chart; German Singles Chart	9; 48
2006	Massari	"Rush the Floor" (feat. Belly)		
2007	Belly	"Pressure" (feat. Ginuwine)	Canadian Singles Chart	10
2007	Belly	"Don't Be Shy" (feat. Nina Sky)	Canadian Hot 100	45
2007	Belly	"I'm the Man" (feat. Kurupt)		
2007	Belly	"Ridin'" (feat. Mario Winans)	Canadian Hot 100	80
2009	Caspian	"Amnesia" (feat. Belly)		
2009	Belly	"Hot Girl" (feat. Snoop Dogg)	Canadian Hot 100	58
2010	Belly	"To The Top" (feat. Ava)		
2010	Belly	"Back Against The Wall" (feat. Kobe)		
2010	Belly	"Make It Go" (feat. Drake)		
2011	Belly	"She Ride" (feat. Gucci Mane & JRDN)		
2011	Mia Martina	"Latin Moon"	Canadian Hot 100	30
2011	Mia Martina	"Burning"	Canadian Hot 100	25
2012	Belly	"I Drink I Smoke" (feat. Snoop Dogg)	Bulgaria Singles Top 40	32
2012	Mia Martina	"Go Crazy" (feat. Adrian Sina)		
2012	Massari	"Full Circle" (feat. Belly)		
2012	Massari	"Brand New Day"	Austrian Singles Chart; Canadian Hot 100; German Singles Chart; Swiss Singles Chart	28; 41; 29; 24
2012	Mia Martina	"Missing You" / "Tu me manques"		
2013	Mia Martina	"HeartBreaker"	Canadian Hot 100	44
2013	Massari	"Shisha" (feat. French Montana)	Canadian Hot 100	37

== Awards ==
Major awards have been won by Massari and Belly.

- Massari - MMVA 2006 (MuchVibe Best Pop Video for Be Easy)
- Belly - MMVA 2007 (MuchVibe Best Rap Video for Pressure)
- Belly - MMVA 2008 (MuchVibe Best Rap Video Ridin')
- Belly - Juno Award 2008 for Hip Hop Recording of The Year
- Belly - MMVA 2010 for VideoFACT Indie Video of the Year "Hot Girl"
