= Rupert Gayle =

Canadian songwriter

- Genres: R&B, Rock, Pop
- Occupations: songwriter, record producer

Rupert Gayle is a Canadian songwriter. He has written for Warner/Chappel and BMG Music Publishing, and is signed to OLE.

== Written and/or produced work ==
- Maxi Priest
- Mindless Behavior
- Shiloh
- Shawn Desman
- Keshia Chanté
- In-Dex
- Lenou
- Jamelia
- Sugar Jones
- Alonzo
- Massari
- Melissa O'Neil
- Audrey de Montigny
- Dru
- Rex Goudie
- Kalan Porter
- Ryan Malcolm
- George
- Brian Melo
