= Fefe Dobson discography =

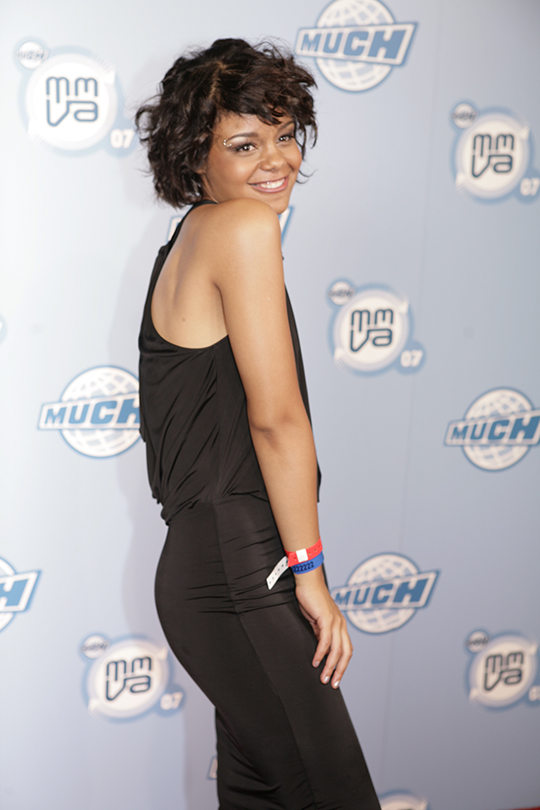
- Dobson at the 2007 MuchMusic Video Awards.
- Studio albums: 4
- Singles: 14
- Music videos: 15
- Digital albums: 1

The discography of Fefe Dobson, a Canadian pop rock singer-songwriter, consists of four studio albums, fourteen singles (including four as a featured artist), fifteen music videos and a number of other appearances.

Her debut album, Fefe Dobson (2003), topped the Billboard Heatseekers Albums chart and generated three top-20 singles on the Canadian Singles Chart, including the top-10 hits "Bye Bye Boyfriend" and "Don't Go (Girls and Boys)". After a period of commercial decline stemming from the shelved release of her intended second album, Sunday Love, (Note: Sunday Love was originally slated for release in September 2005. However, this date was pushed back before the album's release was eventually cancelled by Island Records. The album was later released digitally on December 18, 2012.) Dobson returned in 2010 with Joy. The album's three singles all reached the top 20 on the Canadian Hot 100 chart and were certified Gold or Platinum by Music Canada.

== Albums ==
=== Studio albums ===
List of studio albums, with selected chart positions, sales figures and certifications
| Title | Album details | Peak chart positions | | | Sales | Certifications |
| Title | Album details | CAN | US | US Heat | Sales | Certifications |
|---|---|---|---|---|---|---|
| Fefe Dobson | Released: December 9, 2003; Label: Island; Format: CD, digital download | 26 | 67 | 1 | US: 307,000 | MC: Platinum |
| Joy | Released: November 22, 2010; Label: 21 Music, Island; Format: CD, digital download | 59 | — | — | CAN: 20,000 | MC: Gold |
| Sunday Love | Released: December 18, 2012; Label: Island; Formats: Digital | — | — | — | | |
| Emotion Sickness | Released: September 29, 2023; Label: 21 Music; Format: CD, digital download | — | — | — | | |
"—" denotes a release that did not chart.

== Singles ==
=== As lead artist ===
List of singles as lead artist, with selected chart positions and certifications, showing year released and album name
| Title | Year | Peak chart positions | | | | | | | Certifications | Album |
| Title | Year | CAN | CAN AC | CAN CHR | CAN HAC | UK | US | US Pop | Certifications | Album |
|---|---|---|---|---|---|---|---|---|---|---|
| "Bye Bye Boyfriend" | 2003 | 8 | — | — | — | — | — | — | | Fefe Dobson |
| "Take Me Away" | 2003 | 20 | — | — | — | — | 87 | 25 | | Fefe Dobson |
| "Everything" | 2004 | — | — | 13 | 9 | 42 | — | 39 | | Fefe Dobson |
| "Don't Go (Girls and Boys)" | 2004 | 9 | — | 13 | 9 | — | — | — | | Fefe Dobson |
| "Don't Let It Go to Your Head" | 2005 | — | — | — | — | — | — | — | | Sunday Love |
| "This Is My Life" | 2006 | — | — | — | — | — | — | — | | Sunday Love |
| "Ghost" | 2010 | 14 | 4 | 7 | 6 | — | — | — | MC: Platinum | Joy |
| "Stuttering" | 2010 | 10 | 16 | 7 | 4 | — | — | 39 | MC: 2× Platinum | Joy |
| "Can't Breathe" (featuring Orianthi) | 2011 | 19 | 20 | 13 | 8 | — | — | — | MC: Gold | Joy |
| "Legacy" | 2013 | — | — | 41 | — | — | — | — | | Non-album singles |
| "Celebrate" | 2014 | — | — | — | — | — | — | — | | Non-album singles |
| "In Better Hands" | 2014 | — | — | — | — | — | — | — | | Non-album singles |
| "Save Me from LA" | 2018 | — | — | — | — | — | — | — | | Non-album singles |
| "Fckn in Love" | 2022 | — | — | 23 | 39 | — | — | — | | Emotion Sickness |
| "Recharge My Heart" | 2022 | — | — | — | — | — | — | — | | Emotion Sickness |
| "Hungover" | 2023 | — | — | — | — | — | — | — | | Emotion Sickness |
| "I Can't Love Him (And Love You Too)" | 2023 | — | — | — | — | — | — | — | | Emotion Sickness |
"—" denotes a release that did not chart.

=== As featured artist ===
| Title | Year | Peak chart positions | | Album |
| Title | Year | CAN | UK | Album |
|---|---|---|---|---|
| "Forever in Our Hearts" (with Brian McKnight, Mýa, Nate Dogg, Sonny Sandoval, Jacoby Shaddix, Pete Loeffler, Ben Jelen & Ben Moody) | 2005 | — | — | Non-album charity singles |
| "Wavin' Flag" (with Young Artists for Haiti) | 2010 | 1 | 104 | Non-album charity singles |
| "True Colors" (with Artists Against Bullying) | 2012 | 10 | — | Non-album charity singles |
| "Lean On Me" (with ArtistsCan) | 2020 | 13 | — | Non-album charity singles |
| "Delirious" (Josh Ramsay featuring Fefe Dobson) | 2022 | _ | _ | The Josh Ramsay Show |
"—" denotes a release that did not chart.

=== Promotional singles ===
| Title | Year | Album |
|---|---|---|
| "Watch Me Move" | 2008 | Joy |
| "I Want You" | 2009 | Joy |

== Music videos ==
List of music videos, showing year released and directors
| Title | Year | Director(s) | Ref. |
|---|---|---|---|
| "Bye Bye Boyfriend" | 2003 | George Vale | |
| "Take Me Away" | 2003 | Michael Palmieri | |
| "Everything" | 2003 | Chris Robinson | |
| "Everything" (Film version (Note: The "film version" of the "Everything" music video features scenes from The Perfect Score, which were omitted in the standard version of the music video.)) | 2003 | Chris Robinson | |
| "Don't Go (Girls and Boys)" | 2004 | Rainbows & Vampires | |
| "Don't Let It Go to Your Head" | 2005 | Diane Martel | |
| "I Want You" | 2009 | Eric Sim | |
| "I Want You" (Remix) | 2009 | Aaron A, Samy Inayeh | |
| "Watch Me Move" | 2009 | Aaron A, Samy Inayeh | |
| "I Want You to Watch Me Move" | 2009 | Aaron A, Samy Inayeh | |
| "Ghost" | 2010 | Alan Ferguson | |
| "Stuttering" | 2010 | Alan Ferguson | |
| "Can't Breathe" | 2011 | Aaron A | |
| "Legacy" | 2013 | Aaron A | |
| "In Better Hands" | 2014 | Aaron A | |
| "Save Me from L.A." | 2018 | Unknown | |
| "Fckn in Love" | 2022 | Unknown | |
| "Shut Up and Kiss Me" | 2024 | Unknown | |
As featured artist
| "Wavin' Flag" (among Young Artists for Haiti) | 2010 | Dave Russell, Alex Nadon | |

== Miscellaneous appearances ==
- Nokia Unwired Tour 2003 sampler (2003) (song: "Take Me Away")
- women with a voice compilation (2004) (song: "Everything")
- The Perfect Score soundtrack (2004) (songs: "Everything", "Unforgiven")
- O Canada (2004) (song: "Bye Bye Boyfriend")
- Now That's What I Call Music 15 (2004) (song: "Everything")
- Raising Helen soundtrack (2004) (song: "If You Walk Away")
- MuchDance 2005 compilation (2004) (song: "Truth Anthem")
- TeleToon Toon Trax 2 compilation (2004) (song: "Bye Bye Boyfriend")
- YTV Big Fun Party Mix Vol 6 compilation (2005) (song: "Don't Go")
- Juno Awards compilation (2005) (song: "Take Me Away")
- It's a Boy Girl Thing soundtrack (2006) (song: "Be Strong")
- MuchDance 2011 compilation (2010) (song: "Ghost")
- Radioactive album (2011) (song: "Animal")
- Degrassi: Music from Season 13, Vol. 1 compilation (2013) (song: "Legacy")
- Degrassi: Music from Season 13, Vol. 1 2.0 compilation (2014) (song: "Charge")

=== Songs in other media ===
| Year | Title | Type | Song |
|---|---|---|---|
| 2003 | Miss Match | TV series episode: "Jive Turkey" | "Everything" |
| 2004 | Laguna Beach: The Real Orange County | TV series premiere: "A Black & White Affair" | "Take Me Away" |
| 2004 | Laguna Beach: The Real Orange County | TV series episode: "The Bonfire" | "Don't Go (Girls and Boys)" |
| 2004 | One Tree Hill | TV series episode: "You Gotta Go There to Come Back" | "Everything" |
| 2004 | The Perfect Score | Film | "Everything" |
| 2004 | The Perfect Score | Film | "Unforgiven" |
| 2004 | Raising Helen | Film | "If You Walk Away" |
| 2004 | Tommy Hilfiger | TV ad | "Don't Go (Girls and Boys)" |
| 2004 | WNBA | TV ad: "This Is Who I Am" | "Give It Up" |
| 2006 | It's a Boy Girl Thing | Film | "Be Strong" |
| 2008 | The Cho Show | TV series theme song | "Watch Me Move" |
| 2008 | Lipstick Jungle | TV series promos | "Watch Me Move" |
| 2009 | 90210 | TV series episode:"Women's Intuition" | "I Want You" |
| 2009 | Fringe | TV series promos | "Paranoia" |
| 2009 | Megan Wants a Millionaire | TV series promos | "I Want You" |
| 2009 | The Sims 3: World Adventures | PC game | "I Want You" (Simlish version) |
| 2009 | Tough Love 2 | TV series episode:"The Wow Factor" | "Watch Me Move" |
| 2009 | The Vampire Diaries | TV series premiere:"Pilot" | "I Want You" |
| 2009 | Whip It | Film promos | "I Want You" |
| 2010 | American Idol | TV series episode: "Top 24 Reveal" | "Watch Me Move" |
| 2010 | America's Next Top Model | TV series promos (1–5 of 6) | "Watch Me Move" |
| 2010 | Basketball Wives | TV series episode: "Episode 4" | "Set Me Free" |
| 2010 | Fly Girls | TV series episode: "High Expectations" | "Watch Me Move" |
| 2010 | Style Network | TV station promos | "I Want You" |
| 2010 | Style Network | TV station promos | "Joy" |
| 2010 | Style Network | TV station promos | "Watch Me Move" |
| 2010 | Hellcats | TV series promos | "Rockstar" |
| 2010 | Hellcats | TV series premiere: "A World Full of Strangers" | "Rockstar" |
| 2010 | Hellcats | TV series episode: "Nobody Loves Me But My Mother" | "Stuttering" |
| 2010 | Hellcats | TV series episode: "Ragged Old Flag" | "Watch Me Move" |
| 2012 | The Listener | TV series episode: "Curtain Call" | "Rock It Till You Drop It" (uncredited) |
| 2017 | Riverdale | TV series episode: "Chapter Seven: In a Lonely Place" | "Born to You" |
| 2021 | Canada's Drag Race | TV series episode: "Screech" | "Ghost" |

== Songwriting ==
Commercially released cover versions or songs written by Fefe Dobson recorded by other artists.

| Year | Title | Performer | Album |
|---|---|---|---|
| 2006 | "Don't Let It Go to Your Head" | Lilyjets | 3rd Floor |
| 2007 | "Start All Over" | Miley Cyrus | Meet Miley Cyrus |
| 2008 | "Don't Let It Go to Your Head" | Rockett Queen | Kiss and Tell |
| 2008 | "我愛烦恼 (I Love Trouble)" | S.H.E | FM S.H.E |
| 2009 | "As a Blonde" | Claire Clarke | Shut Your Mouth |
| 2009 | "As a Blonde" | Selena Gomez & the Scene | Kiss & Tell |
| 2009 | "Don't Let It Go to Your Head" | Jordin Sparks | Battlefield |
| 2010 | "Round & Round" | Selena Gomez & the Scene | A Year Without Rain |
| 2023 | "Dirty Martini" | Austin Mahone | A Lone Star Story |
