= Legacy (Fefe Dobson song) =

Single by Fefe Dobson
- Released: August 6, 2013
- Genre: Dance-pop
- Length: 3:17
- Label: 21 Entertainment
- Songwriters: Fefe Dobson; Hasham Hussain; Denarius Motes; Edwin Serrano

Fefe Dobson singles chronology
"Can't Breathe" (2011)	"Legacy" (2013)	"Celebrate" (2014)

"Legacy" is a song recorded by Canadian recording artist Fefe Dobson, originally intended for a studio album tentatively titled Firebird. Dobson co-wrote the song with Hasham Hussain, Denarius Motes, and Edwin Serrano. It was released August 6, 2013 through independent label imprint 21 Entertainment as the album's lead single. "Legacy" premiered on the popular Canadian teen drama series, Degrassi.

== Background and release ==
After being dropped from Island Records during the production of what was to be her second album, Sunday Love, in 2006, Dobson later re-signed with the label for the release of her 2010 album, Joy. The record produced three top-20 hits in Canada, including the international single "Stuttering". Two years after the release of the final single from Joy, Dobson returned with "Legacy", which was released through 21 Music without the association of Island Records. She made a guest appearance as herself on "Summertime", the thirteenth season premiere of Degrassi, which aired its first half on July 11, 2013; in the episode, she performed the tracks "Charge" and "Legacy". The song was released to digital retailers on August 6, 2013. A remix by DJ Klever premiered on SoundCloud on November 12, 2013, which was confirmed by Dobson's management group as an officially-commissioned remix. Dobson's then-fiancé Yelawolf is featured on an alternate version of the remix.

== Critical reception ==
John Walker of MTV wrote that the song is "literally the perfect end-of-summer, wind-down anthem," and that it effectively captures the "nihilistic, live-for-the-moment dance pop" sensibilities of contemporary pop singles. Sam Lansky of Idolator called the song "great," praising its "less slick" production (compared to Joy) and its "mix of pop sensibility and an unbratty punk edge," which he wrote was "quintessentially Dobson."

== Music video ==
The video for "Legacy" was directed by Aaron A and premiered October 25, 2013. Dobson's character in the video is a patient in a psychiatric hospital who impersonates various deceased superstars, including Marilyn Monroe, Amy Winehouse, Michael Jackson, and Kurt Cobain. Following her delusional antics, Dobson breaks out of the facility and drives off with all of her personalities in the back seat. Rachel Brodsky of MTV questioned if the dissociated personalities could be "a metaphor for drawing influence from your favorite artists, but not sounding too derivative."

== Charts ==
Chart (2013)	Peak position
Canada CHR/Top 40 (Billboard)	41

== Release history ==
Country	Date	Format	Version	Label	Ref.
Various	August 6, 2013	Digital download	Original	21 Entertainment	
Various	November 12, 2013	Streaming	Klever remix (solo or featuring Yelawolf)	21 Entertainment	
