= Sunday Love =

Studio album by Fefe Dobson
- Released: December 18, 2012 (digitally)
- Recorded: 2004–2006
- Genre: Alternative rock; pop rock; pop punk
- Length: 42:23
- Label: Island
- Producer: Ben Grosse; Matthew Wilder; Howard Benson; Tom Lord-Alge; Fefe Dobson; The Neptunes

Fefe Dobson chronology
Joy (2010)	Sunday Love (2012)	Emotion Sickness (2023)

Original cover

Singles from Sunday Love
- 1. "Don't Let It Go to Your Head" Released: July 12, 2005; 2. "This Is My Life" Released: March 28, 2006

Professional ratings
Review scores
Source	Rating
AllMusic	3/5 stars
Blender	3/5 stars
ElleGirl	(favorable)
Spin	3/5 stars
Vibe	4/5 stars

Sunday Love is the second studio album by Canadian singer Fefe Dobson. The album was released digitally on the iTunes Store and to streaming services on December 18, 2012.

Originally slated for release in 2005, the release date was pushed back a number of times by Island Records before its eventual cancellation on the label. The album was released promotionally, and received generally positive reviews from music critics. After the Island Records release of the album was cancelled, Dobson commented on her Myspace blog, "I always believe everything happens for a reason, and that change is a very good thing."

== Background ==
Dobson began work on Sunday Love during the summer of 2004. The album's fourteen tracks were recorded over an eight-month period in California. Island Records set an initial US release date of September 20, 2005. Neither single released from the album—"Don't Let It Go to Your Head" or "This Is My Life"—charted. There is an official music video for "Don't Let It Go to Your Head".

Another song from the album, "Be Strong", appears on the It's a Boy Girl Thing soundtrack.

== Track listing ==
1. "As a Blonde" (Fefe Dobson, Greg Wells, Shelly Peiken) – 2:49
2. "In the Kissah" (Pharrell Williams, Chad Hugo, Dobson) – 3:09
3. "If I Was a Guy" (Matthew Wilder, Dobson) – 3:20
4. "Don't Let It Go to Your Head" (Josh Alexander, Billy Steinberg, Dobson) – 4:01
5. "Get You Off" (Dobson, Michelle Robin Lewis, Nina Gordon) – 3:50
6. "This Is My Life" (Alexander, Dobson, Steinberg) – 3:49
7. "Scar" (Wilder, Dobson) – 4:03
8. "Miss Vicious" (Dobson, John Lowery a.k.a. John 5) – 3:07
9. "Man Meets Boy" (Wilder, Dobson) – 3:28
10. "Get Over Me" (Holly Knight, Dobson) – 3:09
11. "Hole" (Kay Hanley, Lewis, Dobson) – 4:27
12. "The Initiator" (Alexander, Steinberg, Dobson) – 3:39
13. "Yeah Yeah Yeah" (Walton Steven "Wally" Gagel, Peiken, Dobson) – 3:39
14. "Be Strong" (Dobson, Wilder) – 3:31

== Covers ==
Dobson's "Don't Let It Go to Your Head" is covered by Lilyjets, a Norwegian girl group, as a single from their 2006 debut album 3rd Floor. They also produced an official music video.

The music of "This Is My Life" is used by the Taiwanese girl-group S.H.E in their song: "I Love Trouble" (我愛烦恼) on their 2008 album FM S.H.E which became quite popular in Asia.

The song "As a Blonde" is covered on Selena Gomez & The Scene's 2009 debut album Kiss & Tell. Jordin Sparks covered "Don't Let Go To Your Head" on her 2009 album Battlefield. Shortly after Sparks's album was released Dobson said, "Jordin Sparks just did [that song], which was on Sunday Love, which was very cool. She did kind of, like, a more R&B version of it, which I think is really nice, actually. It was really cool that she didn't try and do a rock version of it, and she did what she's more comfortable with, which I thought was awesome." Sparks's version was released as a single in the UK on January 4, 2010.

== Personnel ==
Confirmed by multiple sources including Billboard.

- Fefe Dobson – songwriting, vocals
- Matthew Wilder – producer and co-writer (on "Scar", "Be Strong", "Man Meets Boy", and "If I Was a Guy")
- John5 – co-writer, guitar
- Brent Paschke – guitar
- Tim Armstrong – co-writer
- Joan Jett – co-writer
- Pharrell Williams – co-writer
- Cyndi Lauper – co-writer
- Courtney Love – co-writer
- Shelly Peiken – co-writer
- Billy Steinberg – co-writer
- Chad Hugo – co-writer
- Nina Gordon – backing vocals
- Howard Benson – producer (on "This Is My Life" and "Don't Let It Go to Your Head")
- Ben Grosse – producer
- Tom Lord-Alge – producer (on "This Is My Life")

== Cover versions ==
Commercially released cover versions or other commercial usage of Sunday Love songs by other artists.

Year	Title	Performer	Album	Language of song
2006	"Don't Let It Go to Your Head"	Lilyjets	3rd Floor	English
2008	"I Love Trouble": The music of "This Is My Life"	S.H.E	FM S.H.E	Mandarin Chinese
2008	"Don't Let It Go to Your Head"	Rockett Queen	Kiss and Tell	English
2009	"Don't Let It Go to Your Head"	Jordin Sparks	Battlefield	English
2009	"As a Blonde"	Selena Gomez & the Scene	Kiss & Tell	English
2009	"As a Blonde"	Claire Clarke	Shut Your Mouth	English
