= The Staircase Murders =

2007 television film

The Staircase Murders is a 2007 Lifetime television film directed by Tom McLoughlin and starring Treat Williams, Samaire Armstrong, Kevin Pollak, and Laura Bailey. Based on Aphrodite Jones' book A Perfect Husband, the film was written by Jones and Donald Martin.

It tells the story of Michael Peterson, who was convicted in 2003 of killing his wife by beating her over the head. During the trial it was revealed that many years previously a friend of Peterson's, whose children he would later adopt, died under seemingly similar circumstances.
