= Don't Go (Girls and Boys) =

Single by Fefe Dobson

from the album Fefe Dobson (2004 reissue)
- B-side: "Don't Let Me Fall"
- Released: 25 May 2004
- Recorded: 2003
- Genre: Pop rock; synthpop
- Length: 3:18
- Label: Island
- Songwriters: Fefe Dobson; Jay Levine
- Producer: Jay Levine

Fefe Dobson singles chronology
"Everything" (2004)	"Don't Go (Girls and Boys)" (2004)	"Don't Let It Go to Your Head" (2005)

"Don't Go (Girls and Boys)" is a song written and recorded by Canadian singer Fefe Dobson with producer Jay Levine. It was released on May 25 2004, and serves as the fourth and final single from Dobson's self-titled debut album. Although it did not appear on the initial release of the album, the song was appended to later pressings. The song was featured in a 2004 Tommy Hilfiger commercial that starred Dobson.

== Critical reception ==
Rashaun Hall of Billboard wrote that "Don't Go (Girls and Boys)" is "as nostalgic as it is catchy" and is an "instantly infectious jam."

== Track listing ==
CD single

1. "Don't Go (Girls and Boys)" (Fefe Dobson, Jay Levine) — 3:18
2. "Don't Let Me Fall" (Dobson, Levine) — 3:55

There is a version "For Promotional Use Only" sometimes referred to as a DJ single, with just the song and a brief "CALLOUT".

== Music video ==
The music video for "Don't Go" was directed by Rainbows & Vampires and is set in New York City, with references to subways, 43rd Street, and CBGB in both the song and video. The video starred Dobson and Drake Bell running away from two unidentified men in black suits and culminates with Dobson performing the song on-stage at CBGB.

== Chart performance ==
Chart (2004)	Peak position
Canada (Nielsen SoundScan)	9
Canada CHR/Pop Top 30 (Radio & Records)	13
Canada Hot AC Top 30 (Radio & Records)	9

== Release history ==
Country	Date	Format	Label	Ref.
Various	May 25, 2004	Digital download	Island; IDJMG	
United States	June 11, 2004	Contemporary hit radio	Island; IDJMG	
Various	June 29, 2004	CD single	Universal International	
United States	July 9, 2004	Hot adult contemporary	Island; IDJMG	
