= Emotion Sickness (album) =

Studio album by Fefe Dobson
- Released: September 29, 2023
- Length: 28:44
- Label: 21 Music
- Producers: Sam Arion; Tawgs Salter; Alex Pilz Vujic

Fefe Dobson chronology
Sunday Love (2012)	Emotion Sickness (2023)

Singles from Emotion Sickness
- 1. "Fckn in Love" Released: February 25, 2022; 2. "Recharge My Heart" Released: October 21, 2022; 3. "Hungover" Released: June 16, 2023; 4. "I Can't Love Him (And Love You Too)" Released: August 25, 2023

Emotion Sickness is the fourth album of Canadian singer-songwriter Fefe Dobson. It was released on September 29, 2023.

== Background and recording ==
After the release of Joy, Dobson worked a planned fourth album titled Firebird that was eventually cancelled in 2014 after a split with her management. "I wasn't sure if I was making the right choice musically; I got scared that it wouldn't get the love 'Joy' got. So, I just killed it." Following that, she wrote and recorded another album, releasing the single Save Me From LA before shelving it 2018.

In an interview, Dobson stated that the album was written in two months as opposed to previous albums, which were usually written in a year or two. Much of the album was recorded in Toronto's Fairmont Royal York Hotel.

== Critical reception ==
Samuel Stevens of Crucial Rhythm stated, "Emotion Sickness is not only a triumphant return for Fefe Dobson but also a testament to her enduring talent and influence on the music industry. As the world embraces a resurgence of nostalgia in modern pop-rock, Fefe's earnest lyricism and edgy sound are poised to make a significant impact in the 2020s. This album is a testament to her evolution as an artist and a reminder of her enduring legacy in the music world."

Of Flood Magazine, Mike Lesuer stated the album, "sounds less like a nostalgia trip and more like the product of a musician who's kept up to date on the quickly evolving conventions of pop-punk, the record's nine tracks incorporating vibrant electronic sounds and ambitious emotional climaxes in equal measure. Without sacrificing the rebellious attitude and melodic flare heard on her self-titled debut album of two decades ago, the record feels like a proper reinvention of a MySpace-era artist for the TikTok era."

== Track listing ==
All tracks are written by Fefe Dobson, Bryn McCutcheon, Kirstyn Johnson, Sam Arion except where noted.

Emotion Sickness track listing
No.	Title	Producer(s)	Length
1.	"Hungover"	Sam Arion	2:12
2.	"Fckn in Love" (Dobson, Negin Djafari, William Loban Bean)	Tawgs Salter	3:14
3.	"Shut Up and Kiss Me"	Arion	2:43
4.	"Too Late"	Arion	2:54
5.	"Recharge My Heart" (Dobson, Alex Pilz Vujic)	Alex Pilz Vujic, Arion	2:41
6.	"I Can't Love Him (And Love You Too)" (Dobson, Arion)	Arion	3:38
7.	"Dancing for Me"	Arion	3:04
8.	"Someone New"	Arion	3:53
9.	"Let Her Go" (Dobson, Arion)	Arion	4:22
Total length:			28:44

== Personnel ==
Credits adapted from AllMusic.

- Sam Arion – bass, composer, guitar, keyboards, producer, programming
- Eric Boulanger – engineer
- Cook Classics – composer
- Negin Djafari – composer
- Fefe Dobson – composer, vocals
- Justin Hergett – engineer
- Kirstyn Johnson – composer
- Bryn McCutcheon – composer
- Darren McGill – engineer
- Kristian Montano – engineer
- Thomas "Tawgs" Salter – producer
- Andrew Taylor – engineer
- Bradley Thibodeau – drums
- Alex Vujic – composer, producer, programming
- Joe Zook – engineer
