= Fefe Dobson (album) =

Studio album by Fefe Dobson
- Released: December 9, 2003
- Recorded: 2003
- Studios: Metalworks Studios, Mississauga, ON
- Genres: Pop punk; alternative rock; pop rock; rock
- Length: 47:04
- Label: Island
- Producers: Jay Levine; James Bryan McCollum

Fefe Dobson chronology
Fefe Dobson (2003)	Joy (2010)

Singles from Fefe Dobson
- 1. "Bye Bye Boyfriend" Released: August 30, 2003; 2. "Take Me Away" Released: August 18, 2003; 3. "Everything" Released: January 19, 2004

Fefe Dobson is the debut album of Canadian singer-songwriter Fefe Dobson. It was released on December 9, 2003. The album was co-written by Dobson with producers Jay Levine and James Bryan McCollum. The album consists mainly of pop rock and punk music, and deals mainly with the topics of love and heartbreak. Several songs on the album are done acoustically while the remaining tracks feature prominent guitar and drum beats.

The album was released to generally positive reviews from critics; however, its commercial performance was mixed. The album debuted at number one on the US Billboard Heatseekers Albums Chart. It debuted at number 111 on the Billboard 200 chart, eventually peaking at 67. Despite the minor success of the single "Everything" in the UK, the album failed to chart there, or anywhere outside of the US and Canada.

The album did, however, spawn several successful singles. The first of these, titled "Bye Bye Boyfriend" was released during the final quarter of 2003 to generally positive critical and commercial performance. However, the single was only released in Canada. The second single, "Take Me Away", was her first single to be released internationally. The single became her second hit in Canada, as well as her only single to date that has charted on the US Billboard Hot 100 singles chart. In 2004, Dobson released a new single, "Don't Go (Girls and Boys)", which was then appended to later pressings of the album. The song was also featured in a Tommy Hilfiger commercial starring Dobson.

In March 2004, the album was certified Platinum by the Canadian Recording Industry Association for sales of 100,000 copies. It has also sold over 300,000 copies in the US, giving it sales a roundabout 500,000 copies worldwide.

== Background ==
Dobson started writing at the age of 14, and caught the ear of Jive Records a year later. The label loved her voice and set her up with a number of producers, with an eye towards developing a pop star. But she refused the idea and left the label. After that experience, Dobson met Jay Levine and signed with Nelly Furtado's manager Chris Smith. Smith arranged showcases with several labels. Universal Music Canada president Randy Lennox showed interest in her, and coaxed Island Def Jam CEO Lyor Cohen and his head of A&R, Jeff Fenster, to fly to Toronto for another showcase. Dobson played a showcase for Island/Def Jam; about 30 seconds into the first song —- a punk thrash track about longing, titled "Stupid Little Love Song"—-the executives were impressed and signed her. When in the recording studio, she hung up inspirational pictures of Kurt Cobain, Judy Garland, Coldplay, Jeff Buckley, and The Vines to help motivate her sound and to commemorate the artists who influenced her.

Dobson wrote most of the music on the album, along with producer Jay Levine. However, several other producers pitched in to help write for the album, including James Bryan McCollum. The album was written in approximately two years, mainly by Dobson herself.

== Composition ==
The music heard on Fefe Dobson's debut album is generally pop-rock, as well as some traces of punk music. Several songs on the album are also in an acoustic format, stripped down to just Dobson and the guitar. The music was different from most music put out at the time, such as recent releases by Britney Spears and Christina Aguilera. In fact, Dobson originally signed with Jive Records, who intended to make her the next big pop star. However, Dobson didn't want to be a pop-star and wanted to make her own type of music, and quickly left the label.

The first track on the album is titled "Stupid Little Love Song". Lyrically, the song is an uptempo rock/punk song that lyrically speaks of Dobson's love for someone who is famous, stating lyrics such as "I came by taxi/you can by limousine". The second song on the album is the album's lead single, "Bye Bye Boyfriend". The song's verse is a moderately paced beat, fueled by guitar and drums. During the verse, Dobson states she's sorry for leaving her boyfriend. However, as the chorus arrives, the lyrical content and music change, becoming more uptempo and guitar driven. The lyrics also show a sudden change, as she talks of letting him go as though he was nothing special. "Take Me Away" is the third track on the album, as well as the second single (first international release). The single performed well on singles charts in the US and Canada, reaching the top 20 in Canada. It is a moderately paced pop-rock tune that lyrically speaks of running away with someone she loves. "Everything" is the fourth song on the album, and the third single as well. Lyrically the song revolves around Dobson asking her lover if he is ready to be committed to her and their relationship. It is her only song to chart in the UK to date, where it had minor success on their main singles chart. "Rock It 'Til You Drop It" is the fifth song from Dobson's debut album. The single is an uptempo dance/rock track that features Tone Lōc on vocals. The song lyrically speaks of dancing on the dancefloor with a guy. "Revolution Song" is the sixth track on the album, and is one of the acoustic songs featured on the album. It has been stripped down to nothing other than Dobson's vocals and the acoustic guitar.

"Kiss Me Fool" is the seventh song placed on the album, and is yet another uptempo rock song. Lyrically the song talks of Dobson wanting her love interest to kiss her. She also questions what she must change about herself to please the man she has her eyes set on. "Unforgiven" is one of the more personal songs on the album, as well as one of the most rock driven and dark songs on the album. It talks about Dobson's father, and all the mistakes that he made while trying to raise her. In the song, Dobson speaks of her independence, and how she never really did need him in her life. The end of the chorus shows Dobson yelling that he's "unforgiven". "We Went For a Ride" is the ninth song to be placed on the album. The song is generally slower and more pop oriented than the rest of the album. The lyrics speak of riding away with her love interest, to never come back and drive away from all of their problems. "Give It Up" is the tenth track on the album. The verse of the song is generally slower and slower-paced than most music on the album, however, the chorus quickly shifts to a rock driven beat filled with drums and bass. Lyrically Dobson is telling her ex that there's nothing he can do to win her back, and he should just "give it up". "Julia" is another acoustic song on the album, and is reportedly about her friend who had an eating disorder. "8x10" is the final track listed on the album. It is another acoustic song on the album, and is considered a good ending to the album by some critics.

== Release and reception ==
=== Commercial performance ===
The album debuted at number one on the US Billboard Heatseekers Albums Chart. It debuted at number 111 on the Billboard 200 chart, eventually peaking at 67. Despite the minor success of the single, "Everything" in the UK, the album failed to chart there, as well as chart anywhere outside of the US and Canada.

=== Critical reception ===
Professional ratings
Review scores
Source	Rating
allmusic.com	4/5 stars
Barnes & Noble	(favorable) link
Blender	link
Rolling Stone	link

The album was met with generally positive reviews from critics and fans. Music-Review.com stated that "Fefe doesn't mess around. The very first song is the very best song; if "Stupid Little Love Song" was released as a single, it would blow this narrow little worldwide open with its tight slashing crunching goodness. Not only is it fast and hard and funky like a Thierry Henry penalty kick, but it's funny too: our protagonist is feeling a little outmatched by her boyfriend's super-accomplished family, and doesn't know how to deal: "You're on the road to Harvard Law / I'm on the bus to Arkansas". His mother's a Senator, his dad's got his own talk show, he's a big jocky handsome guy, and all she has for him is...pause... "Just a stupid little love song!" and they all spazz out with the guitars again. I'm not saying it's prime Clash or anything, but the way Dobson yells "Put 'em up!" in the breaks is pretty inspiring."

Johnny Loftus of allmusic.com stated in his review of the album that "...Dobson created a rousing debut that, despite being a highly melodic and relentlessly effective pop album, is rescued from flavor-of-the-moment dissipation by a schizophrenic rock crunch and her own attractively bad attitude." He went on to say that " Fefe Dobson definitely has an opportunistic streak, and its stylistic cherry-picking can be trying. But production niceties and savvy marketing can't fake the talent Fefe has. It's her willingness to inject pop with pluck and rock as much as she flutters that makes Dobson's debut much more than just a popternative clone. Best of all, it still caters to those casual fans who won't know any better." The review ends with the album being awarded four out of five stars.

== Promotion ==
During much of 2004, Dobson promoted her debut album, appearing for a live performance on TRL and numerous magazine covers and articles. Dobson made an appearance on the NBC series American Dreams, in which she played the role of Tina Turner, covering the song "River Deep, Mountain High". She was also the opening act on Justin Timberlake's European tour, which was especially poignant inasmuch as when she was 13 she had a major crush on him. That July, she released a new single, "Don't Go (Girls and Boys)", which was also featured in a Tommy Hilfiger commercial starring the singer. The album was later reissued with that single added. Dobson also had a new song, "If You Walk Away", on the soundtrack for Raising Helen.

== Singles ==
- "Bye Bye Boyfriend" is the first single from the album, and was released in the final quarter of 2003. The single was released only in Canada, which is Dobson's home country. The single became a major hit there, peaking at number 8 on the Canadian Singles Chart. The single also had a music video, which was directed by Vale George and produced by Mark Hesselink.
- "Take Me Away" is the official second single from the album. It was sent to radio on August 18, 2003, and received a generally positive reception from music critics. It is her debut single in the US and UK, due to her previous single only being released in Canada. The single failed to make an impact in the UK, however it reached the top 20 of the Canadian Hot 100, becoming her second consecutive single to do so. It is also her only single to date that has charted on Billboard's Hot 100 in the US, where it peaked at 87.
- "Everything" is the third official single from the album, and second international single. The song was released on May 20, 2004, in the US, Canada and the UK. The single failed to have the same success as her previous singles in Canada, where it failed to chart. It has, however, became Dobson's only single to date that has charted in the UK, where it reached a peak of 47.
- "Don't Go (Girls and Boys)" is the fourth and final single from the album, released on June 29, 2004, as the lead single from the album's reissue. The single became yet another hit for Dobson in her home country of Canada, where it reached a peak of 10, making it her second single to reach the top ten of the Canadian Hot 100.

== Track listing ==
No.	Title	Writer(s)	Length
1.	"Stupid Little Love Song"	Fefe Dobson, Jay Levine, James Bryan McCollum	3:19
2.	"Bye Bye Boyfriend"	Dobson, Levine, McCollum	4:14
3.	"Take Me Away"	Dobson, Levine	3:29
4.	"Everything"	Dobson, Levine, McCollum	4:11
5.	"Rock It Till You Drop It"	Dobson, Levine	4:05
6.	"Revolution Song"	Dobson, Levine, McCollum	3:51
7.	"Kiss Me Fool"	Dobson, Levine, McCollum	4:00
8.	"Unforgiven"	Dobson, Levine	4:07
9.	"We Went For a Ride"	Dobson, Levine	3:42
10.	"Give It Up"	Dobson, Levine	3:36
11.	"Julia"	Dobson, Levine	4:03
12.	"8 x 10"	Dobson, Levine, McCollum	4:09
13.	"Rainbow" (hidden track)	Dobson, Levine	2:30

UK bonus tracks
No.	Title	Writer(s)	Length
13.	"Rainbow"	Dobson, Levine	2:30
14.	"Don't Let Me Fall"	Dobson, Levine	3:55

2004 reissue
No.	Title	Writer(s)	Length
13.	"Don't Go (Girls and Boys)" (hidden track)	Dobson, Levine	3:18
14.	"Rainbow"	Dobson, Levine	2:30

== Personnel ==
Credits for Fefe Dobson adapted from Allmusic

- Jonathan Benedict- A&R
- Kirk Broadbridge- guitar
- Shanna Busman- art direction
- Steve Chahley- assistant director
- Lenny DeRose- mixing
- Katrina Dickson- photography
- Fefe Dobson- composer, vocal arrangement
- Jeff Fenster- A&R
- Andrew Hollander- piano, string arrangements
- Dan Kanter- guitar, guitar effects
- Jennifer Goble Klein- assistant engineer
- J. Levine- composer
- Jaclyn Levine- Pro-Tools
- Tom Lord-Alge- mixing
- James Bryan McCollum- arranger, composer, digital editing, drum programming, guitar, classical guitar, instrumentation, orchestration, piano, Pro-Tools, producer, soloist, string programming
- Darrel Moen- vocal engineer
- Phil Mucci- photography
- James Murray- digital editing, engineer, mixing, Pro-Tools
- Rick Patrick- creative director
- Patrick "Plain Pat" Reynolds- A&R
- David Schiffman- engineer
- Zak Soulam- guitar
- Tone-Loc- rap
- Andy West- art direction
- Nir Z.- drums, percussion

== Charts and sales certifications ==
Chart positions			Certifications (sales thresholds)
CAN	US	US Heat	Certifications (sales thresholds)
26	67	1	CAN: Platinum; US: 307,000

== Awards and nominations ==
Year	Award	Result
2005	Juno Award for Pop Album of the Year	Nominated

== In other media ==
Year	Title	Type	Song
2004	One Tree Hill	TV series Episode: "You Gotta Go There to Come Back"	"Everything"
2004	The Perfect Score	Film	"Everything"
2004	The Perfect Score	Film	"Unforgiven"
2004	Tommy Hilfiger	TV Ad	"Don't Go (Girls and Boys)"
