= Samaire Armstrong =

American actress (born 1980)

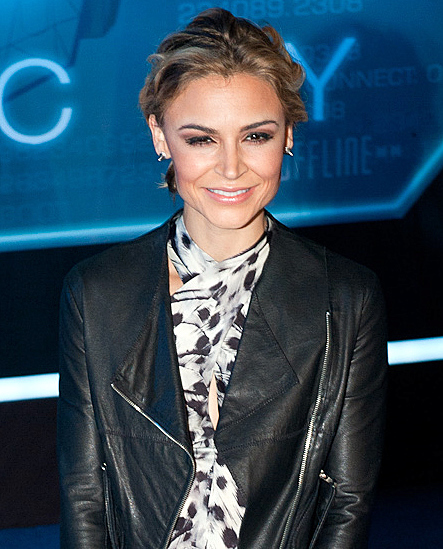
- Armstrong in 2010
- Born: Samaire Rhys Armstrong; October 31, 1980 (age 45); Tokyo, Japan
- Occupation: Actress
- Years active: 2000–present
- Children: 1

Samaire Rhys Armstrong (/sɑːˈmiːrɑː/ sah-MEE-rah; born October 31, 1980) is an American actress. She is best known for her roles in Stay Alive, The O.C., It's a Boy Girl Thing, and as Juliet Darling in the ABC television series Dirty Sexy Money. She has appeared on television as Elaine Richards in the ABC fantasy-drama Resurrection. She has also appeared in music videos for "Penny & Me" by Hanson and "Bad Day" by Daniel Powter.

== Early life ==
Armstrong was born in Tokyo to a Scottish father, Hunter Armstrong, and an Italian mother, Sylvia Sepielli. Her mother designs spas for resorts and her father teaches soldiers close combat training. Armstrong lived in Japan for five years, before moving to Hawaii and later Sedona, Arizona, where she grew up and attended Sedona Red Rock High School. She has also lived in Malaysia and China.

== Career ==
=== Television ===
In 2000, Armstrong made her television debut guest starring in an episode of the teen drama television series Party of Five portraying Meredith. Throughout 2000 to 2001, Armstrong made guest roles on television shows such as The X-Files, ER, Judging Amy and Freaks and Geeks.

In 2003, Armstrong was cast in the role of Anna Stern on the Fox teen drama television series, The O.C.. Armstrong was intended to only appear in one episode. However, after her character proved to be a fan favorite, she was brought back to appear in several more episodes. She portrays the role of a self-confessed comic book reader and a sarcastic socialite from Pittsburgh who is a recurring love interest for Seth Cohen. Despite the regular appearance of her character throughout the series first season, she was not promoted to series regular and was not in season two. She was in two episodes of the third season, and was not in the fourth and last season.

In 2004, Armstrong appeared on the HBO television series Entourage, as an assistant to Ari Gold and love interest for Eric Murphy. She was praised for her performance. She appeared in only eight episodes of the series' first two seasons. She went on to guest star in the television series CSI: Miami and Living with Fran.

In 2007, Armstrong was cast in her first series regular role on the ABC drama/comedy television series, Dirty Sexy Money. She portrayed the role of Juliet Darling, a spoiled heiress who aspired to be a serious actress. The series was an instant success and premiered on September 26, 2007, to 10.44 million viewers. The series received mixed reviews from critics. Her character has been noted to have many similarities to real-life heiress Paris Hilton. In March 2008 Armstrong announced she would not return for the series second season as a series regular. The series did not maintain its success and slipped in ratings throughout its run dramatically. The series was cancelled on August 8, 2009.

In 2010, Armstrong guest appeared in the HBO television series How To Make It In America in the series first episode portraying the role of Jane.

In 2012, she appeared in 8 episodes of The Mentalist, as a prostitute turned confidential informant for the California Bureau of Investigation. Her character Summer shared a kiss with Tim Kang's character Kimball Cho in the episode "At First Blush" after Cho admitted having feelings for Summer.

In September 2013, she played the mother of the blond boy who perpetrated the school shooting in the Sons of Anarchy season six premiere "Straw".

=== Film ===
Armstrong made her film debut portraying the role of Kara Fratelli, one of the conjoined twins in the parody film Not Another Teen Movie in 2001. Samaire has since appeared in notable small roles in films such as Would I Lie To You?, Gramercy Park and Trash. In 2006, Armstrong co-starred alongside Lindsay Lohan in the film Just My Luck portraying the role of Maggie, Lohan's character's best friend. The film was a box office bomb and was negatively received by critics.

In 2005, The O.C. producer McG offered the leading female protagonist role in the horror film Stay Alive. She portrays the role of Abigail, an aspiring photographer and love interest to Jon Foster's character. The film was released on June 29, 2006, and debuted at #3 at the U.S. box office. Despite a worldwide gross of just $27,105,095 it was considered a box office success compared to the film's modest $9 million budget. The film was negatively received by critics with her performance receiving mixed reviews.

Armstrong starred as Nell Bedworth in the Canadian comedy It's a Boy Girl Thing, which was released on December 26, 2006, and received positive reviews from critics. The film was considered a box office success, earning worldwide $7,385,434. Samaire's performance was praised by critics.

In 2007, Armstrong starred in a supporting role as Jenny in the horror film Rise: Blood Hunter alongside Lucy Liu. The film was a box office and critical failure. She also had a leading role portraying Caitlin Atwater in the Lifetime film The Staircase Murders. The film follows the real-life crimes of Michael Peterson who was convicted in 2003 of pushing his wife down the stairs. The film received mixed reviews.

In 2008, Armstrong starred the independent romance film Around June. The film follows a young woman who finds love with an illegal immigrant whose love changes her life. Filming took place in San Francisco, California, in 2008. The film played at the Santa Cruz Festival in 2009. Armstrong has since been cast in another independent film, a crime thriller The Last Harbor, which released in 2010. She also starred in another thriller, 5 Souls, in 2013.

== Personal life ==
Armstrong entered an "outpatient facility" in October 2007 "to deal with some personal issues." She checked out after six weeks but returned and stayed for another three months.

In December 2012, Armstrong and her then-boyfriend Jason Christopher welcomed their first child, a boy. She lives in Sedona, Arizona, where she went to school as a teen. In 2022, she ran for and lost the Sedona mayoral election.

Armstrong is a conservative and voted for Donald Trump in the 2016 presidential election. In 2020, she stated that "BLM is a billion dollar domestic terrorist organization" on her Instagram.

== Filmography ==
=== Film ===
Year	Title	Role	Notes
2001	Not Another Teen Movie	Kara Fratelli	
2002	Would I Lie to You?	Sophie	Video
2003	Dark Wolf	Josie	Video
2006	Stay Alive	Abigail	
2006	Just My Luck	Maggie	
2006	It's a Boy Girl Thing	Nell Bedworth/Woody Deane	
2007	Rise: Blood Hunter	Jenny	
2008	Around June	June	
2010	The Last Harbor	Roxanne Hall	
2013	Concrete Blondes	Tara Petrie	
2013	5 Souls	Miranda	
2013	My Santa	Jen Robbins	
2014	The Lachrymist	Ms. Alice Alquist	Short film
2014	A Winter Rose	Simone	
2015	Windsor Drive	Brooke	
2017	Carter & June	June O'Malley	
2020	The 2nd	Olivia	
2020	The Office Mix-up	Joan	
2022	Terror on the Prairie	Soiled Dove	
2024	God's Not Dead: In God We Trust	Lottie Jay	

=== Television ===
Year	Title	Role	Notes
2000	Party of Five	Meredith	Episode: "Taboo or Not Taboo"
2000	Freaks and Geeks	Laurie	Episodes: "Discos and Dragons", "Smooching and Mooching"
2000	That's Life	Brittany	Episode: "When Good Ideas Go Bad"
2001	ER	Tasha	Episode: "Sailing Away"
2001	Judging Amy	Angie Becker	Episode: "Look Closer"
2001	The X-Files	Natalie Gordon	Episode: "Lord of the Flies"
2003	Trash	Gypsy	TV film
2003–2006	The O.C.	Anna Stern	Recurring role (15 episodes)
2004	Gramercy Park	Jillene	TV film
2004	NYPD Blue	Christine	Episode: "You're Buggin' Me"
2004–2005	Entourage	Emily	Recurring role (8 episodes)
2005	NUMB3RS	Skyler Wyatt	Episode: "Obsession"
2006	CSI: Miami	Brynn Roberts	Episode: "High Octane"
2007	The Staircase Murders	Caitlin Atwater	TV film
2007	Living with Fran	Laurie	Episode: "Plastered"
2007–2009	Dirty Sexy Money	Juliet Darling	Regular role (11 episodes)
2010	How to Make It in America	Jane	Episode: "Pilot"
2011	Better with You	Jessica	Episode: "Better Without a Couch"
2011–2012	The Mentalist	Summer Edgecombe	Recurring role (8 episodes)
2012	Adopting Terror	Cheryl Broadbent	TV film
2013	Sons of Anarchy	Darvany Jennings	Episodes: "Straw", "One One Six"
2014	Heavenly Match	Casey Hart	TV film
2014–2015	Resurrection	Elaine Richards	Main role (21 episodes)
2015	Stalker	Lucy	Episode: "Salvation"
2016	Agent Carter	Wilma Cully	Episode: "Smoke & Mirrors"
2016	NCIS: New Orleans	Marion Watkins	Episode: "Second Chances"
2017	Arrow	Laura Ramirez	Episode: "Spectre of the Gun"
2017	Grey's Anatomy	Claire Nolan	Episode: "Back Where You Belong"
2017	NCIS	Melissa Goodman	Episode: "Fake It Till You Make It"
2018	Robot Chicken	Trish Walker / Patti Mayonnaise	Voice role; episode: "Strummy Strummy Sad Sad"
2019	House on the Hill (aka He's Out to Get You)	Megan	TV film
2019	Deadly Excursion	Samantha McCarthy	TV film
2019	Who Stole My Daughter?	Janet Sullivan	TV film
2021	Deadly Excursion: Kidnapped From the Beach	Samantha McCarthy	TV film
2024	Acting Coach Nightmare	Lisa	TV film
TBA	The Devil May Care	Daisy	Also executive producer

=== Music videos ===
Year	Title	Artist
2004	"Penny & Me"	Hanson
2005	"Bad Day"	Daniel Powter
2024	"Penny & Me (Moonlight Version)"	Hanson
