= Ghost (Fefe Dobson song) =

Single by Fefe Dobson

from the album Joy
- Released: May 11, 2010
- Recorded: 2010; BAMF Studios, (Los Angeles, CA; United States)
- Genre: Synthpop; electrorock
- Length: 3:46
- Label: 21 Music; Island
- Songwriters: Kara DioGuardi; Fefe Dobson; J. Kasher; Kevin Rudolf
- Producer: Kevin Rudolf

Fefe Dobson singles chronology
"This Is My Life" (2006)	"Ghost" (2010)	"Stuttering" (2010)

Music video
- "Ghost" on YouTube VEVO (FefeDobson Channel)

"Ghost" is a song by Canadian singer-songwriter Fefe Dobson from her second (released) studio album, Joy (2010). It was produced by Kevin Rudolf, and co-written by Dobson, Rudolf, Kara DioGuardi and Jacob Kasher Hindlin. The song officially impacted American mainstream radio on May 11, 2010, and was released as a digital single on June 21, 2010, by 21 Music and Island Records.

"Ghost" achieved success in Canada, attaining the peak position of #14 on the Canadian Hot 100 and being certified Platinum by Music Canada. The song appears on the MuchDance 2011 compilation that was released in November 2010. It also was performed as the lip sync song of the 3rd episode of the second season of Canada's Drag Race.

== Chart performance ==
"Ghost" debuted on the Canadian Hot 100 chart dated June 19, 2010, at number 98. The song peaked at #14 first attained on the chart for the week of August 21, 2010, due to high airplay and digital downloads. It was Dobson's first single to enter the Canadian adult contemporary charts, in addition to the airplay formats at which she was already established.

== Music video ==
The music video was released on June 28, 2010, via Vevo.

The video starts off with Dobson leaving the club while her song "Watch Me Move" is playing. Her face suddenly goes blank as she discovers her boyfriend (played by actor Douglas Owens) kissing another girl in the back of a red Dodge Challenger. The songs starts as she peers through the open window. She is then seen dancing around the Challenger in black and white leather outfits. It also shows her boyfriend dreaming many hallucinations where he thinks Dobson is there, but she really isn't. When the second verse starts, he wakes up.

There are shots of him aggressively playing the drums and his new girlfriend trying to comfort him as he gives her the cold shoulder. There are also scenes where Dobson is seen dancing on and around a bare bed in an abandoned building. During the second chorus, the boyfriend is shown secretly looking at pictures of him and Dobson, and neglecting a dinner his new girlfriend made for him but instead wandering the street. He hallucinates again and sees Dobson in the Challenger while they are making-out in the back, explaining that she caught him.

During the breakdown of the song, he starts scratching his arm and a tattoo with Dobson singing appears, with the words "I Haunt You In Every Dream" underneath. He wakes up realizes it was just a dream, and tries to fall back asleep, only to find Dobson is sleeping next to him. When he looks back it is his girlfriend again, but now Dobson is dancing upside down from the ceiling, but then she disappears. The video ends as Dobson sets the mattress on fire, and his girlfriend leaves angrily because she found the pictures of Dobson hiding in his dresser.

== Personnel ==
- Songwriting – F. Dobson, K. Rudolf, K. DioGuardi, J. Kasher
- Production – Kevin Rudolf
- Mixing – Serban Ghenea
- Mix engineer – John Hanes (Assisted by Tim Roberts)
- Instruments (except Drums) – Kevin Rudolf
- Drums – Dorian Crozier
- Vocal arrangement – Kara DioGuardi

== Charts ==
=== Weekly charts ===
Chart (2010)	Peak position
Canada Hot 100 (Billboard)	14
Canada AC (Billboard)	4
Canada CHR/Top 40 (Billboard)	7
Canada Hot AC (Billboard)	6

=== Year-end charts ===
Chart (2010)	Position
Canada (Canadian Hot 100)	47

== Certifications ==
Region	Certification	Certified units/sales
Canada (Music Canada)	Platinum	80,000^{*}
^{*} Sales figures based on certification alone.

== Release history ==
Region	Date	Format	Label	Ref.
United States	May 11, 2010	Contemporary hit radio	21 Music; Island; IDJMG	
Canada	June 21, 2010	Digital download	21 Music; Island	
United States	July 6, 2010	Digital download	21 Music; Island	
