= It's a Boy Girl Thing =

2006 film by Nick Hurran

- UK theatrical release poster
- Directed by: Nick Hurran
- Written by: Geoff Deane
- Produced by: Steve Hamilton Shaw; David Furnish; Martin F. Katz
- Starring: Kevin Zegers; Samaire Armstrong; Sherry Miller; Robert Joy; Sharon Osbourne; Maury Chaykin; Mpho Koaho; Emily Hampshire; Brooke D'Orsay; Genelle Williams
- Cinematography: Steve Danyluk
- Edited by: John Richards
- Music by: Christian Henson
- Production companies: Icon Productions; Rocket Pictures; Scion Films; Alliance Atlantis; Propspero Pictures
- Distributed by: Icon Entertainment International
- Release date: 26 December 2006 (United Kingdom)
- Running time: 95 minutes
- Countries: United Kingdom; Canada
- Language: English
- Box office: £7.3 million

It's a Boy Girl Thing is a 2006 romantic comedy film directed by Nick Hurran and written by Geoff Deane, starring Kevin Zegers and Samaire Armstrong and set in the United States but filmed and produced in Canada and the United Kingdom. The producers of the film are David Furnish, Steve Hamilton Shaw of Rocket Pictures and Martin F. Katz of Prospero Pictures. Elton John serves as one of the executive producers.

It's a Boy Girl Thing was produced by Elton John's motion picture company Rocket Pictures and independently distributed by Mel Gibson's Icon Productions and was released on 26 December 2006 in the United Kingdom and has since then been released in some countries in cinemas, in others directly to DVD, and in others as a TV film. Most of the school scenes were shot at Western Technical Commercial School in Toronto, Ontario.

== Plot ==
Woody Deane and Nell Bedworth are neighbors who go to the same high school, but are complete opposites. Woody is a popular varsity football player while Nell loves literature but lacks social skills. They loathe each other and are constantly at odds.

One day, on a school field trip to a museum, they are forced to work together on an assignment. They quickly begin arguing in front of a statue of the ancient Aztec god Tezcatlipoca. As they argue, the statue casts a spell upon them. The next morning, they wake up in each others bodies.

Arriving at school, they immediately blame each other for the body swap, but agree to be the other person until they can switch back. At first, they seem to succeed, but quickly return to arguing when they feel they are misrepresenting each other, such as Woody (in Nell's body) answering a question oddly in class.

The following day, Nell (in Woody's body) arrives at school dressed "dorky" in "Chinos and an Oxford cotton button-down", which frustrates Woody. He is even more frustrated after discovering how badly Nell (in Woody's body) failed at football practice.

As payback, Woody (in Nell's body) dresses provocatively the following day. After school, Nell, in retaliation, breaks up with Breanna, Woody's girlfriend. The humiliation competition continues when Woody (in Nell's body) drives off with biker boy Nicky, making Nell think she is going to lose her virginity. However, Woody cannot do it and leaves Nicky just as he is removing his clothing.

The following day, Nicky spreads rumors around school about his night with Nell. When Nell finds out, she gets very upset and Woody finds her. Admitting he didn't actually lose Nell's virginity, he explains that everyone was simply spreading Nicky's lies. As Nell feels let down, Woody confronts Nicky. Woody (in Nell's body) isn't strong enough, so Nell (in Woody's body) punches him in the face. Afterwards, Nell and Woody reach a truce and realize the Tezcatlipoca statue at the museum caused the body swap.

At the museum they discover that just confronting the statue fails to switch them back. They realize they will have to help each other in two important upcoming events: Nell must learn how to play football for Woody's Homecoming game and Woody must learn about poetry and literature for Nell's Yale interview.

Later that night Nell (in Woody's body) gets drunk at a party while Woody (in Nell's body) is stuck at a slumber party. He listens to all the gossip about himself, and gets a bikini wax.

Spending so much time together, Nell and Woody become very fond of and start to understand each other better. The night before the interview and the game, they agree to go to the Homecoming Dance together, as "not a date."

The day of the interview and match, Woody initially botches the Yale interview. But when told the interview is over, he starts to talk about poetry in rap, which impresses and astonishes the interviewer. After that, he goes to the football game and watches Nell make the winning touchdown in the last seconds. A college recruiter witnesses his performance and gives Nell his card.

After the game, Woody and Nell congratulate each other for their successes. Shortly afterwards, the spell lifts and they return to their original bodies. The scene finishes with Woody being kissed by Breanna and an upset Nell going home.

The following day, Woody tries to talk to Nell, but is stopped by her mother who sees his family as uneducated. Nell receives an acceptance letter from Yale, meaning that Woody successfully completed her Yale interview. However, she is still upset with him, and decides not to go to the Homecoming Dance.

Nell's father talks with her about Woody, during which she confesses that she truly likes him. Her father surprises her with a dress and shoes for the dance. Woody and Breanna are selected as the Homecoming King and Queen. As they prepare to dance, an upset Woody sees Nell, and both confess their love for each other.

They leave the school together and share a kiss in front of their houses. The following day, Nell tells her mother she is taking a year's sabbatical before attending Yale. She hops into Woody's car and they drive off together.

== Cast ==
- Samaire Armstrong as Nell Bedworth/Woody Deane
- Kevin Zegers as Woody Deane/Nell Bedworth
- Maury Chaykin as Stan Deane
- Robert Joy as Ted Bedworth
- Sherry Miller as Katherine Bedworth
- Sharon Osbourne as Della Deane
- Mpho Koaho as Harry 'Horse' Horson
- Brooke D'Orsay as Breanna Bailey
- Genelle Williams as Tiffany
- Emily Hampshire as Chanel
- Dan Warry-Smith as Team Guy #1
- Alex Nussbaum as Mr. Zbornak
- Jack Duffy as Old Man
- John Bregar as Richard
- David Ndaba as Team Guy #2
- Robert James Ramsay as Team Guy #3

== Soundtrack ==
The film's soundtrack features a range of music including a cover version of "I Think We're Alone Now" by Girls Aloud, "Let's Get It Started" by The Black Eyed Peas, "Be Strong" by Fefe Dobson, "High" by James Blunt and "Push the Button" and "Red Dress" by the Sugababes, as well as other songs by the likes of Ozzy Osbourne, Elton John, Orson, Marz and many more.

== Reception ==
On Rotten Tomatoes the film has an approval rating of 67% based on reviews from 9 critics. Empire magazine gave it a score of 3 out of 5.
