= 3rd Floor =

Studio album by Lilyjets
- Released: 2006
- Genre: Pop
- Label: Bennier Music

Singles from 3rd Floor
- 1. "Going Blind" Released: 2005; 2. "Crave" Released: 2005; 3. "Don't Let It Go to Your Head" Released: 2006; 4. "Perfect Picture (It Would Be Better)" Released: 2006

3rd Floor is the debut and only album released by Norwegian girl band Lilyjets in 2006. It was released on the Bennier Music label.

== Track listing ==
1. "On Top"
2. "Hit by a Girl"
3. "Perfect Picture (It Would Be Better)"
4. "Going Blind"
5. "Brand New Place"
6. "Today"
7. "Don't Let It Go to Your Head" (Josh Alexander, Billy Steinberg, F. Dobson)
  - cover, original song by Fefe Dobson
8. "Since You Been Gone"
9. "Hitchiker"
10. "Aileen"
11. "Crave"
12. "1000 Songs"

== Singles ==
- "Going Blind"
- "Crave"
- "Don't Let It Go to Your Head" (Alexander, Steinberg, Dobson)
  - cover, original song by Fefe Dobson
- "Perfect Picture (It Would Be Better)"

== Music video ==
There is an official music video for "Don't Let It Go to Your Head".
