= Can't Breathe =

2011 single by Fefe Dobson

Single by Fefe Dobson featuring Orianthi

from the album Joy
- Released: March 30, 2011
- Recorded: 2010; Anarchy Studios West (Nashville, TN; United States)
- Genre: Electrorock; pop rock; alternative rock
- Length: 3:47
- Label: 21 Music; Island
- Songwriter(s): Fefe Dobson; Bob Ezrin; Thomas "Tawgs" Salter; Tommy Henriksen
- Producer(s): Bob Ezrin; Tommy Henriksen

Fefe Dobson singles chronology
"Stuttering" (2010)	"Can't Breathe" (2011)	"Legacy" (2013)

Orianthi singles chronology
"Courage" (2010)	"Can't Breathe" (2011)	"Frozen" (2013)

Music video
- "Can't Breathe" on YouTube

"Can't Breathe" is a song by Canadian singer-songwriter Fefe Dobson from her second released studio album, Joy (2010), which features a guitar solo from Australian musician Orianthi. It was written and produced by Bob Ezrin and Tommy Henriksen, and co-written by Dobson and Thomas "Tawgs" Salter. The song was released in March 2011 as the album's third and final single, and was only released in Canada. Dobson reported on her Twitter in April of that year that the song had been sent to radio.

== Music video ==
The music video was released on March 29, 2011 via Vevo.

== Personnel ==
- Songwriting – F. Dobson, B. Ezrin, T. "Tawgs" Salter, T. Henriksen
- Production – Bob Ezrin, Tommy Henriksen
- Mixing – Serban Ghenea
- Mix engineer – John Hanes (Assisted by Tim Roberts)
- Programming, keyboards, strings, bass and electric guitars: Tommy Henriksen
- Keyboards and additional programming: Bob Ezrin, Thomas "Tawgs" Salter and Tim Lauer
- Lead guitar: Steve Hunter
- Guitar solo: Orianthi
- Backing vocals: Vicki Hampton and Fefe Dobson

== Charts ==
Chart (2011)	Peak position
Canada (Canadian Hot 100)	19
Canada AC (Billboard)	20
Canada CHR/Top 40 (Billboard)	13
Canada Hot AC (Billboard)	8

=== Year-end charts ===
Chart (2011)	Peak position
Canadian Hot 100	76

== Certifications ==
Region	Certification	Certified units/sales
Canada (Music Canada)	Gold	40,000^{*}
^{*} Sales figures based on certification alone.
