= Lilyjets =

Norwegian band

Lilyjets were a Norwegian girl group with the members being Lisbeth Marie T. Mjaugeto (1983), Kine Lee T. Aksnes (1984) and Tinki Tønseth Troye (1984). They started singing and writing music together at an early age. Their music is based on their vocal harmonies and the acoustic guitar. They were signed to Bonnier Amigo Music (Scandinavia) at the age of 17, and signed another deal to Universal in 2006, that included the rest of the world. They have won 2 awards for their first album, 3rd Floor released in October 2006. They split in January 2014.

They have released a single, "Song for You", from their second album, which was released in 2008.

== Discography ==
=== Singles ===
- "Going Blind"
- "Crave"
- "Don't Let It Go to Your Head" (Josh Alexander, Billy Steinberg, F. Dobson)
  - cover, original song by Fefe Dobson
- "Perfect Picture (It Would Be Better)"
- "Song for You"

=== Albums ===
- 3rd Floor (2006)

== Music video ==
There is an official music video for "Don't Let It Go to Your Head".

== Equipment ==
- Tinki plays a Gibson acoustic Sheryl Crow signature.
