= Joy (Fefe Dobson album) =

Studio album by Fefe Dobson
- Released: November 22, 2010
- Recorded: 2007–2010
- Genres: Pop rock; pop
- Length: 40:46
- Label: Island
- Producers: Bob Ezrin; David Lichens; Gadget; Howard Benson; Josh Abraham; Jon Levine; J. R. Rotem; Kevin Rudolf; Luke Walker; Oligee; Tommy Henriksen

Fefe Dobson chronology
Fefe Dobson (2003)	Joy (2010)	Sunday Love (2012)

Singles from Joy
- 1. "Ghost" Released: May 11, 2010; 2. "Stuttering" Released: September 7, 2010; 3. "Can't Breathe" Released: March 30, 2011

Joy is the third studio album released by Canadian singer-songwriter Fefe Dobson. It was released on November 22, 2010, on Island Records in Canada and November 30, 2010, on 21 Music in the United States after taking almost four years to complete. It candidly follows Dobson's evolution as an artist as well as transition from the indie type of music she originally put together for Joy, to the mainstream pop hits. The album was preceded by the release of the two buzz singles "Watch Me Move" and "I Want You", which were then followed-up by the three top 20 official singles "Ghost", "Stuttering" and "Can't Breathe", all of which have at least one music video.

== Background and development ==
"But on this record it [Joy], I know what I like and I know what I want to sound like on stage. I know the things I want to do. I’m still growing and I’m still figuring it out, but at least I have my head around it a little bit more than when I was 18. So the process was easier because I’m more patient with myself. I’m not as hard on myself. I think a lot of times we get really hard on ourselves and we're like, 'Oh, this needs to be perfect! This needs to be perfect!' But, what is perfection, right?"

— Fefe Dobson

By 2006, Dobson returned to the studio to work on what was to become her unreleased album at the time, Sunday Love, which featured collaborations with such artists as Billy Steinberg, Matthew Wilder, Cyndi Lauper, Courtney Love, Joan Jett, Nina Gordon, The Neptunes and Rancid’s Tim Armstrong. In the interim, several of her songs were covered, including "Start All Over", a song which was recorded for Sunday Love, but never made the album, by Miley Cyrus, "Don't Let It Go to Your Head", the first single, by American Idol winner Jordin Sparks, and "As a Blonde", which was covered by Selena Gomez & the Scene. Dobson was dropped from her label, Island Records, upon the shelving of her album, Sunday Love, after the release of two singles from it, the album was later released digitally in 2012. She then decided to go back to her roots and create a new album on her own terms. She said in an April 2007 interview that her new efforts were coming along nicely and should see the light of day sooner than later. However, during Dobson's songwriting and independent period, Joy had faced multiple delays due to her management, Chris Smith Management. Two years after Dobson spoke with ChartAttack.com, she was picked back up by Island. This caused numerous more push backs since Island wanted Dobson to write new tracks for the album, and omit previous ones.

In an interview to Idolator, Fefe said: "Now, I write a lot more on guitar. I know that sounds weird, but I do. I find that I write on this record from guitar starting off. Also, I’m not this, like, tough on myself. When I was younger I used to write and go, 'Oh, that’s not good enough.' 'No. No. No. No one will like that.' 'I can't write that by myself because no one will understand.' And now, I put myself out there a little more. I take the risk of when I’m writing with somebody I’m not as afraid to say, 'Hey, what about this idea?' When I was young I was a little bit more afraid to step out and to make a mistake." The album reflects the "emotional" and "dramatic" music of her adolescence, with Dobson using Janet Jackson's "Black Cat" as a specific example.

== Composition and production ==
“I’m a sucker for love,” admits Fefe. “When I was in junior high, I would carry around this huge volume of Shakespeare. I just like the romantic vibe. I write about it because I fall in and out of love quite a bit. I was always pulling on my mother’s heartstrings to get more love.”

— Fefe Dobson

From the rhyme playground anthem and first single, "I Want You", the tribal percussion of "Can't Breathe", produced by rock legend Bob Ezrin (KISS, Pink Floyd's The Wall, Lou Reed), and the sassy retort of "You Bitch", produced by Howard Benson (All-American Rejects, My Chemical Romance, Daughtry, Hawthorne Heights, Gavin DeGraw, Papa Roach), to the dance-floor thump of the tongue-in-chic "Paranoia" and the arena, flick-your-Bic torch song, "In Your Touch", Fefe has finally found the sweet spot in her mix of rock and club beats. Joy reflects that passion, both musical and personal, with Fefe's sensuality oozing out of songs like the speeded-up punk of "Watch Me Move" ("I’m a firecracker/Better tell your mother… W-w-w-w-watch me move"), the Pretenders-like ballad "Shame" and the pure ecstasy of the title track ("I got joy in the bedroom/When it’s just you and I/I got joy when you satisfy me").

Working with producers David Lichens, Jon Levine, Howard Benson and Bob Ezrin on Joy, Dobson lives up to the portraits of her heroes she first hung during the recording of her first album—Kurt Cobain, Judy Garland, Coldplay, the Vines and Jeff Buckley. She co-wrote most of the songs on the album, usually composing on guitar, her choice of instrument. "I play the few chords that I know," she says. "I try to write melodies off the same chords. ‘Joy’ is written with about three chords, and an extra one in the bridge." Songs like "I Want You", which has been heard in the TV series The Vampire Diaries, as well as in promos for the film Whip It and The Sims 3: World Adventures computer game, come straight from experience.

““I am woman, hear me roar,” she laughs. “Aren’t we all animals at the end of the day? I like to show that side of me, but in a respectful way. I’m just expressing myself. It’s all about feeling good and confident about yourself, and not letting anyone else tell you what you can or can't do.”

— Fefe Dobson

“Shame” is a torch song underlined with jungle rhythms that is a confessional in which she does the breaking up. “When I went to demo the song, I had to go see an ex-boyfriend,” says Fefe. “I felt I betrayed him, so I wanted to clear the air. I could not sing it until I did. This reflects that relationship. As humans, we're not perfect. We sometimes hurt people and break hearts, but it’s OK to apologize.” In "Can’t Breathe" and "Watch Me Move", Fefe is confident in showing off her raw sexuality. About the album she said: "I don't regret a thing," she says. "I keep moving forward and not looking back. I couldn't ask for anything better. I’m a girl from suburban Canada who never thought I’d be able to do what I’ve accomplished. And I’m not done yet."

== Promotion ==
Two buzz singles for the record were released in 2008 and 2009. The first, "Watch Me Move", was released as a digital music download on September 9, 2008. The second, "I Want You", was released digitally on July 3, 2009. These songs have been featured in film, television, and more. Dobson also re-recorded the vocals for "I Want You" in Simlish for the PC game The Sims 3: World Adventures. On August 5, 2009, a group of music videos premiered on MTV, The N, and LOGO. They consisted of the individual videos for "I Want You" and "Watch Me Move", a mashup of "I Want You" and "Watch Me Move" entitled "I Want You 2 Watch Me Move", and a remix of "I Want You".

On August 11, 2009, Dobson performed a concert at the Mercury Lounge in New York City. Attendance was by invitation only and included fans and music industry tastemakers. "Fefe performed a set — which included old favorites from her self-titled debut album and upcoming sophomore effort, Joy — that was drenched with passion, soaked with edge, and slicked with pop perfection." "Her new songs were incredibly well received and displayed the incredible growth and maturity of Fefe’s music." One of the new songs heard was "I Made Out with Your Boyfriend" and a video was captured by a correspondent. In an interview at the showcase, Dobson mused "It's almost like when an animal is in a small cage, but when you let it out it's running around like crazy. That's how I feel when I'm onstage." For the remainder of the year, Dobson performed at various events while she was finishing up the album.

On August 27, 2009, Dobson gave a "sneak peek" of her song "Paranoia" also stating that it will be a single, but was later released on the Telus version of the album. It was featured in the promo for the Fox series, Fringe.

Dobson performed on a twenty city tour across Canada in March and April 2010 on Hedley's The Show Must Go...On The Road Tour.

== Critical reception ==
Professional ratings
Review scores
Source	Rating
Allmusic	4.5/5 stars
NOW	2/5 stars
Robert Christgau	(choice cut)
Seventeen	(positive)

The album received critical acclaim from both Seventeen and the website Allmusic, who gave it a rating of 4.5/5 stars. Matthew Chisling said: "Joy may not be such a cheerful album, but it stands to be an epic comeback for a genuinely talented pop artist who was shafted by the industry that would welcome her back with open arms, and that is definitely a joyous story". On the other hand, NOW gave Joy a poor review, saying "There’s a handful of good guitar-fuelled anthems, but they're grossly outnumbered by bland mid-tempo pop tunes that go nowhere. Maybe a mixed-race rocker chick from Scarborough is a tough thing for a major label to know how to market, but trying to turn her into a third-rate Rihanna is not the answer".

== Commercial performance ==
The album debuted and peaked at number 59 on the Canadian Top 100 Albums Chart.

== Singles ==
"Ghost" was released on June 21, 2010, as the album's lead single, following the release of two promotional singles. The single officially impacted mainstream radio on May 11, 2010. The song peaked at number 14 on the Canadian Hot 100. "Stuttering" was released as the second single on September 7, 2010. The single officially impacted mainstream radio on October 12, 2010. The song reached number 10 on the Canadian Hot 100 and number 40 on the US Pop Songs, becoming the most successful single of the album. A video was shot for "Can't Breathe" and was released on March 30, 2011, on MuchMusic. The song debuted at number 100 on the Canadian Hot 100 chart and has peaked at number 19 in its eleventh week. Dobson has reported on her Twitter that the song has been sent to radio.

== Track listing ==
No.	Title	Writer(s)	Producer(s)	Length
1.	"Intro" (hidden track)			0:13
2.	"Ghost"	Fefe Dobson; Kevin Rudolf; Kara DioGuardi; Jacob Kasher	Rudolf	3:49
3.	"Thanks for Nothing"	Dobson; Josh Abraham; Bonnie McKee; Luke Walker	Josh Abraham; Oligee; Brian Connors; Luke Walker*	3:20
4.	"Stuttering"	Dobson; J.R. Rotem; Claude Kelly	Rotem	3:13
5.	"Can't Breathe" (featuring Orianthi)	Dobson; Bob Ezrin; Tawgs Salter; Tommy Henriksen	Bob Ezrin; Tommy Henriksen	3:47
6.	"You Bitch"	Dobson; Nicole Hughes; P. Sjostrom	Howard Benson	3:23
7.	"Didn't See You Coming"	Dobson; Jon Levine; Anjulie Persaud	Dave Lichens; Gadget*	4:29
8.	"Watch Me Move"	Dobson; Dave Lichens; Andrea Wasse	Lichens	1:58
9.	"I Want You"	Dobson; Lichens; Persaud	Lichens	2:15
10.	"I'm a Lady"	Dobson; Lichens; Wasse	Lichens	2:58
11.	"In Your Touch"	Dobson; Connors; Lichens	Lichens	4:42
12.	"Set Me Free"	Dobson; Levine	Levine	3:09
13.	"Joy"	Dobson; Hughes	Lichens	3:35

Canadian Telus and digital deluxe edition
No.	Title	Length
14.	"I Made Out with Your Boyfriend"	3:10
15.	"Johnny Cash"	3:02
16.	"Black Haired Boy"	3:25
17.	"Paranoia"	3:19

Canadian iTunes Store deluxe edition
No.	Title	Length
18.	"I Want You" (Music video)	2:07
19.	"Ghost" (Music video)	4:02
20.	"Stuttering" (Music video)	4:25
21.	"Digital Booklet"

(*) Additional production

== Personnel ==
Credits for Joy adapted from Allmusic

- Josh Abraham – composer, producer
- Jorn Anderson – drums
- Joe Baldridge – mixing
- Howard Benson – keyboards, producer, programming
- Cameron Bristow – assistant engineer, digital editing, Pro-Tools
- Kim Bullard – keyboards, programming
- Paul Bushnell – bass
- Noel "Gadget" Campbell – A&R, executive producer
- Ryan Chalmers – assistant engineer, digital editing, Pro-Tools
- Ben Chang – engineer
- Justin Cortelyou – engineer
- Dorian Crozier – drums
- Adam Culvey – drums, percussion
- Jeff Dalziel – vocal producer, vocal recording
- Paul DeCarli – digital editing
- Dean Dichoso – drums, engineer, mixing
- Kara DioGuardi – composer, vocal arrangement
- Fefe Dobson – composer, executive producer, vocals (background)
- Bob Erzin – composer, keyboards, producer, programming
- Stephen Ferrera – A&R
- Chris Gehringer – mastering
- Serban Ghenea – mixing
- Keith Haaland – guitar
- Kevin Haaland – guitar
- Alex Haldi – art direction, graphic design, photography
- Ray Hammond – A&R
- Vicki Hampton – vocals (background)
- John Hanes – mixing
- Tommy Henriksen – associate producer, composer, electric guitar, programming
- Steve Hunter – guitar
- Hatsukazu "Hatch" Inagaki – engineer
- Rami Jaffee – keyboards
- Terese Joseph – A&R
- Doug Joswick – package production
- Nikki Jumper – cover photo
- Dan Katner – guitar
- Claude Kelly – composer, vocal producer, vocals (background)
- Emanuel Kiriakou – guitar
- Tim Lauer – keyboarding, programming
- Jon Levine – composer, keyboards, producer
- Dave Lichens – bass, composer, producer, programming
- Brian Malouf – mixing
- John Nicholson – drum technician
- Oligee – producer
- Orianthi – guitar, soloist
- Eric Pall – drums
- Timm Parker – assistant engineer, digital editing, Pro-Tools
- Jeff Pelletier – assistant engineer, digital editing, Pro-Tools
- Mike Plotnikoff – engineer
- Eric Ratz – engineer, mixing
- Antonio "L.A." Reid – executive producer
- Tim Roberts – mixing assistant
- Marc Rogers – bass
- J.R. Rotem – composer, instrumentation, producer
- Kevin Rudolf – composer, instrumentation, producer
- Thomas "Tawgs" Salter – composer, keyboards, programming
- Rony Schram – photography
- George Seara – engineer
- Chris Smith – executive producer
- Mike Smith – assistant engineer, digital editing, Pro-Tools
- James Allan Toth – assistant engineer, digital editing, Pro-Tools
- Marc VanGool – guitar technician
- Luke Walker – additional production, composer
- Ryan Williams – engineer
- Phil X.-guitar
- Kristen Yiengst – art coordinator, photography
- Frank Zummo – drums

== Charts ==
Chart performance
Chart (2010)	Peak position
Canadian Albums (Nielsen SoundScan)	59

== Certifications ==
Certifications
Region	Certification	Certified units/sales
Canada (Music Canada)	Gold	40,000^{‡}
^{‡} Sales+streaming figures based on certification alone.

== Release history ==
Release dates and formats
Region	Date	Format	Ref.
Canada	November 22, 2010	CD, digital download	
United States	November 30, 2010	CD, digital download	
