= Stuttering (Fefe Dobson song) =

Single by Fefe Dobson

from the album Joy
- Released: September 7, 2010
- Recorded: 2010; Germano Studios, (New York City, United States)
- Genre: Pop rock
- Length: 3:09
- Label: 21 Music; Island
- Songwriters: Fefe Dobson; Claude Kelly; J. R. Rotem
- Producer: J. R. Rotem

Fefe Dobson singles chronology
"Ghost" (2010)	"Stuttering" (2010)	"Can't Breathe" (2011)

Music video
- "Stuttering" on YouTube VEVO (FefeDobson Channel)

"Stuttering" is a song by Canadian singer–songwriter Fefe Dobson from her second (released) studio album, Joy. It was produced by J. R. Rotem, and co-written by Dobson, Rotem, and Claude Kelly. The song was released as a single on September 7, 2010, by 21 Music and The Island Def Jam Music Group and officially impacted mainstream radio on October 12, 2010. The song has achieved success in Canada, becoming Dobson's first top ten hit on the Canadian Hot 100 and being certified Platinum by Music Canada. A remix featuring rapper Pusha T was released in November 2010.

== Reception ==
"Stuttering" has received generally positive reviews from music critics. AllMusic's Matthew Chisling wrote that the song "proves [Dobson is] on top of the pop market, with some immaculate writing and production". Complimenting Dobson's vocal performance, Sputnikmusic wrote, "she belts out impressively high and quick notes during the chorus with no real effort at all, because the girl can sing."

== Chart performance ==
"Stuttering" charted on the Canadian Hot 100, debuting at number 78 on the issue dated November 6, 2010. It eventually peaked at number 10, becoming Dobson's first top ten on the chart’s new format and her first top ten since 2004. It is also her highest-charting single from Joy, surpassing the prior single, "Ghost", which peaked at number 14.

In the United States, the song peaked at number 65 on the Hot 100 Airplay chart and at number 39 on the Pop Songs chart, marking her first entry on the latter since "Everything" in 2004.

== Music video ==
The video was directed by Alan Ferguson. It premiered October 29, 2010. The video begins with Dobson questioning a hotel manager (a French cowboy) about her boyfriend and she thinks he is covering for him; she then sees a man she believes is him. As she walks to his hotel room she sings. Once she gets there she puts on a leather jacket (owned by the man's girlfriend), then the girlfriend comes into the room and the music stops while she says, "Who the hell are you!" and Dobson retorts, "Who the hell are you?" Just then the man gets out of the shower and Dobson realizes that she does not know him. She then proceeds to run out of the hotel room and takes off the jacket, when the French cowboy grabs her and yells at her for 'bringing a lot of business but not paying' and she starts to remember a party that she went to and cheated on her boyfriend. The video then flashes back to Dobson being in a car that crashed causing her to have amnesia. As she gets out of the overheated car and walks away, she talks about amnesia leading "to a really bad stomachache" and admits that she is the one "that needed to be held accountable".

== Credits and personnel ==
- Fefe Dobson – lead vocals, songwriting
- J. R. Rotem – songwriting, production, instruments
- Claude Kelly – backing vocals, songwriting, vocal production
- Ben "Bengineer" Chang – recording
- Serban Ghenea – mixing
- John Hanes – mix engineer
- Tim Roberts – assistant engineer
- Emanuel Kiriakou – guitar

== Charts ==
=== Weekly charts ===
Chart (2010)	Peak position
US Hot 100 Airplay (Billboard)	65

Chart (2011)	Peak position
Canada Hot 100 (Billboard)	10
Canada AC (Billboard)	16
Canada CHR/Top 40 (Billboard)	7
Canada Hot AC (Billboard)	4
US Pop Airplay (Billboard)	39

=== Year-end charts ===
Chart (2011)	position
Canada (Canadian Hot 100)	45

== Certifications ==
Region	Certification	Certified units/sales
Canada (Music Canada)	2× Platinum	160,000^{‡}
^{‡} Sales+streaming figures based on certification alone.

== Release history ==
Region	Date	Format	Version	Label	Ref.
Various	September 7, 2010	Digital download	Original	21 Music; Island; IDJMG	
United States	October 12, 2010	Contemporary hit radio	Original	IDJMG	
Various	November 24, 2010	Streaming	Pusha T remix	Unknown	
