= Bye Bye Boyfriend =

Single by Fefe Dobson

from the album Fefe Dobson
- B-side: "Stupid Little Love Song"
- Released: 30 August 2003
- Genre: Alternative rock
- Length: 4:14
- Label: Island
- Songwriter(s): Fefe Dobson; Jay Levine; James Bryan McCollum
- Producer(s): Jay Levine; James Bryan McCollum

Fefe Dobson singles chronology
"Bye Bye Boyfriend" (2003)	"Take Me Away" (2003)

Music video
- "Bye Bye Boyfriend" on YouTube

"Bye Bye Boyfriend" is Fefe Dobson's first single, taken from her first album, Fefe Dobson. The Canadian single version has "Stupid Little Love Song" as the B-side. "Bye Bye Boyfriend" was included as the B-side of her CD single "Take Me Away".

== Track listing ==
1. "Bye Bye Boyfriend" (Fefe Dobson, Jay Levine, James Bryan McCollum) — 4:14
2. "Stupid Little Love Song"

== Charts ==
Chart (2004)	Peak position
Canada (Canadian Singles Chart)	8

== Music video ==
The music video shows Dobson performing on a stage with her band and taking revenge on her boyfriend. It was directed by Vale George and produced by Mark Hesselink and Gregory Hergott.

== Awards and nominations ==
Year	Award	Result
2003	CASBY Award for Favourite New Single	Nominated
