= Take Me Away (Fefe Dobson song) =

2003 single by Fefe Dobson

Single by Fefe Dobson

from the album Fefe Dobson
- B-side: "Bye Bye Boyfriend"
- Released: 18 August 2003
- Studio: Metalworks (Mississauga, Ontario)
- Genre: Pop-punk; alternative rock; hard rock
- Length: 3:32
- Label: Island Def Jam
- Songwriters: Fefe Dobson; Jay Levine
- Producers: Jay Levine; James Bryan McCollum

Fefe Dobson singles chronology
"Bye Bye Boyfriend" (2003)	"Take Me Away" (2003)	"Everything" (2004)

Music video
- "Take Me Away" on YouTube

"Take Me Away" is a song by Canadian singer-songwriter Fefe Dobson from her eponymous debut studio album (2003). It was sent to radio as the second single from the album on 18 August 2003 by the Island Def Jam Music Group. The song was written by Dobson and Jay Levine, whilst production was helmed by Levine and James Bryan McCollum. "Take Me Away" debuted at number 96 on the US Billboard Hot 100 on 15 November 2003 and later peaked at number 87.

== Production ==
The song was written by Dobson and Jay Levine, whilst production was helmed by Levine and James Bryan McCollum. The song had added an alternative rock flavour with rebellious themes, Guitars and drums were also added.

== Artwork ==
Dobson would later question the design of the "Take Me Away" single cover and its seeming intention to mask her mixed race, suggesting it might've been done "to not shock people" and possibly present her as a white woman (although she is half-Jamaican Canadian).

== Critical reception ==
Chuck Taylor of Billboard called "Take Me Away" a "refreshing change of pace" in the pop music landscape and wrote that the song "rocks steady with a siren assault of hyper-hooky guitars."

== Music video ==
The music video was directed by Michael Palmieri and produced by Mike O'Connor. It shows her performing the song in a concert style. There is also an official 'making of' video.

== Accolades ==
Year	Award	Result
2004	Canadian Radio Music Award for Best New Solo Artist [CHR (Top 40)]	Won
2004	MuchMusic Video Awards for Best Pop Video	Nominated
2004	Muchmusic Video Awards for People's Choice Favourite Canadian Artist	Nominated

== Track listings and formats ==
- CD single
1. "Take Me Away" – 3:32
2. "Bye Bye Boyfriend" – 4:14

== Personnel ==
Personnel are adapted from the Fefe Dobson album liner notes.

- Fefe Dobson – vocals, writer, vocal arrangements
- Jay Levine – writer, producer, instrumentation, orchestration, arrangements, vocal arrangements, digital editing, Pro Tools operation
- Dan Kanter – guitar
- James Bryan McCollum – guitar, producer, instrumentation, orchestration, arrangements, digital editing, Pro Tools operation
- Kirk Broadbridge – guitar
- Tom Lord-Alge – mixing
- James Murray – engineering, digital editing, Pro Tools operation
- Dave Schiffman – additional engineering
- Jennifer Klein – engineering assistant
- Steve Chahley – engineering assistant
- Nir Z – drums
- Colin Robinson – percussion
- Jack Dailey – bass

== Charts ==
Chart (2003)	Peak position
Canada (Canadian Singles Chart)	20
US Billboard Hot 100	87
US Pop Airplay (Billboard)	25

== Release history ==
Region	Date	Format	Label	Ref.
United States	18 August 2003	Contemporary hit radio	Island Def Jam	
