= Don't Let It Go to Your Head (Fefe Dobson song) =

2005 single by Fefe Dobson

Single by Fefe Dobson

from the album Sunday Love
- Released: July 12, 2005
- Studio: Bay 7 Studios, Valley Village; Sparky Day Studio, Calabasas
- Genre: Pop rock
- Length: 3:55 (radio edit); 4:02 (promo album version)
- Label: Island
- Songwriters: Josh Alexander, Billy Steinberg, Fefe Dobson
- Producer: Howard Benson

Fefe Dobson singles chronology
"Don't Go (Girls and Boys)" (2004)	"Don't Let It Go to Your Head" (2005)	"This Is My Life" (2006)

Music video
- "Don't Let It Go to Your Head" on YouTube

"Don't Let It Go to Your Head" was the first single released in anticipation of what was expected to be Fefe Dobson's second album, Sunday Love. The album release was pushed back a number of times before its eventual cancellation. The single is available for digital download at online retailers.

"Don't Let It Go to Your Head" was covered by Lilyjets, a Norwegian girl group, as a single from their debut album 3rd Floor (2006). They also produced an official music video.

The song was also covered by Jordin Sparks on her second album Battlefield (2009). Shortly after Sparks' album was released Dobson said, "Jordin Sparks just did [that song], which was on Sunday Love, which was very cool. She did kind of, like, a more R&B version of it, which I think is really nice, actually. It was really cool that she didn't try and do a rock version of it, and she did what she's more comfortable with, which I thought was awesome."

== Personnel ==
- Tom Lord-Alge - mixing
- Kenny Aronoff - drums
- Howard Benson - Producer, keyboards + programming
- Paul Boshnell - bass
- Paul Decarli - Pro Tools editing
- Hatsukazu Inagaki - assistant engineer
- Keith Nelson - guitar tech
- Mike Plotnikoff - recording
- Phil X - guitars

== Music video ==
The official music video has several scenes showing Dobson jumping on a bed and tearing the stuffing out of it. It was directed by Diane Martel.

== Release history ==
Release dates and formats for "Don't Let It Go to Your Head"
Region	Date	Format	Label(s)	Ref.
United States	July 26, 2005	Mainstream airplay	Island	

== Jordin Sparks version ==
"Don't Let It Go to Your Head"

Single by Jordin Sparks

from the album Battlefield
- B-side: "Landmines" (Main Version)
- Released: January 8, 2010 (UK)
- Recorded: February–March 2009
- Studio: Mason Sound (Hollywood, CA)
- Genre: Pop; R&B
- Length: 4:10
- Label: Jive
- Songwriters: Josh Alexander, Fefe Dobson, Billy Steinberg
- Producer: Harvey Mason, Jr.

Jordin Sparks singles chronology
"Art of Love" (2009)	"Don't Let It Go to Your Head" (2010)	"I Am Woman" (2011)

American Idol champion Jordin Sparks released her version of the song as the third single from her second studio album, Battlefield (2009). It was released as a digital download in the UK only on January 8, 2010.
