= The Perfect Score =

- Theatrical release poster
- Directed by: Brian Robbins
- Screenplay by: Marc Hyman; Jon Zack; Mark Schwahn
- Story by: Marc Hyman; Jon Zack
- Produced by: Roger Birnbaum; Jonathan Glickman; Brian Robbins; Michael Tollin
- Starring: Erika Christensen; Chris Evans; Scarlett Johansson; Darius Miles
- Cinematography: J. Clark Mathis
- Edited by: Ned Bastille
- Music by: John Murphy
- Production companies: MTV Films; Tollin/Robbins
- Distributed by: Paramount Pictures
- Release date: January 30, 2004 (United States)
- Running time: 93 minutes
- Country: United States
- Language: English
- Box office: $10.9 million

The Perfect Score is a 2004 American teen comedy-heist film directed by Brian Robbins and starring Chris Evans, Erika Christensen, Bryan Greenberg, Scarlett Johansson, Darius Miles, and Leonardo Nam.

The film focuses on a group of six New Jersey high school students whose futures will be jeopardized if they fail the upcoming SAT exam. They conspire to break into a regional office of the Lawrence Township, New Jersey–based Educational Testing Service (ETS), which prepares and distributes the SAT, and steal the answers to the exam, so they can all get perfect scores. The film deals with themes of one's future, morality, individuality, and feelings.

The Perfect Score has similarities to other high school films, including The Breakfast Club (1985) and Dazed and Confused (1993), which are often referenced throughout the film. The film was released by Paramount Pictures on January 30, 2004 and received negative reviews from critics and grossed $10 million.

== Plot ==
Everyman high school student Kyle needs a high score on the SAT to get into Cornell University's architecture program. He constantly compares himself to his older brother Larry, who is now living above his parents' garage. Kyle's best friend, Matty, wants to get a high score to go to the same college as his girlfriend, but he is an underachiever who had previously received a low score on his PSAT. They feel the SAT is blocking their futures.

The two boys realize fellow student Francesca Curtis' father owns the building that houses the regional office of ETS, where the SAT answers are located. She initially doesn't want to help but reconsiders, saying "What the hell? It sounds like fun." Meanwhile, Kyle is attracted to Anna Ross, the second-highest-ranked student in the school, and he tells her about the plan. Anna had bombed a previous SAT and needs a good score to get into Brown University.

Matty doesn't like the fact that Anna now knows about the plan and rants, right in front of stoner Roy, who then has to be included in the heist. Finally, Anna tells the school basketball star Desmond Rhodes, who needs a score of 900 or better to join the basketball team at St. John's University.

An early attempt to break into the ETS offices fails, but they then devise another plan. On the eve of the exam, Francesca will arrange for Kyle and Matty to have a meeting near the top floor, staying after closing. The other three will wait outside and watch the night guard until Francesca, Kyle, and Matty have successfully stolen the answers.

The plan initially goes well, with Francesca, Kyle, and Matty successfully avoiding security cameras and the night guard. However, the answers are located on a computer, and only the technical genius Roy can crack the password; he and the other two get into the building, and Roy correctly guesses the password after seeing a photograph of an employee. Still, the answers can't be printed, so the group decides to take the test with their combined knowledge and get the answers that way. In the early hours of the morning, they are finished and have all the answers written down.

Just then, the guard comes up the stairs, and they try to escape through the ceiling; however, Francesca is left behind and is about to be discovered, so Matty sacrifices himself to save her. Everyone else escapes, but each faces a certain confrontation before the exam. Kyle's brother asks him if he's really worse than a thief, Matty is bailed out by Francesca, Anna finds independence from her parents, and Desmond's mother convinces Roy to quit drugs.

Before the SAT testing begins, the group realizes that, although it will help get them what they want, they would be better off without cheating. Roy grabs the answers and randomly distributes them in the bathroom. After the decision, Matty comments that "this whole thing was for nothing." Kyle replies, "I wouldn't say nothing", as he glances at Anna. Matty and Francesca also share a look, as they have also presumably started a relationship.

Each person eventually gets their desired test score without the answers: Kyle's dream of becoming an architect is still alive by attending Syracuse University, Desmond ends up going to St. John's, Matty becomes an actor, Francesca writes a novel (which is about six kids who conspire to steal the answers to the SAT), and Anna decides to travel to Europe for a while before starting college. Roy explains that he earned the highest SAT in the county, and, guided by Desmond's mom, he gets a GED. He then puts his untapped intelligence to use through programming, becoming a successful video game designer.

== Cast ==
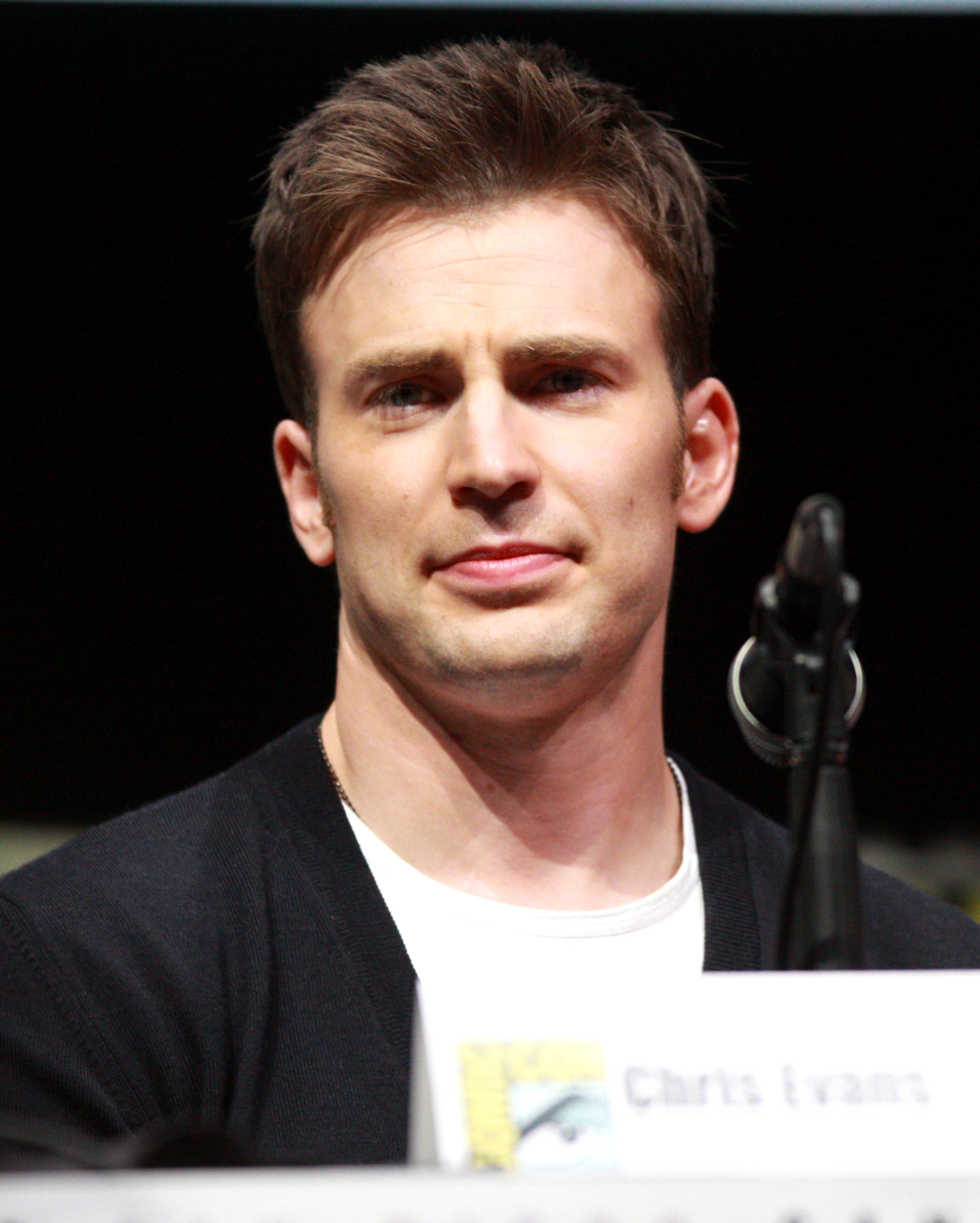
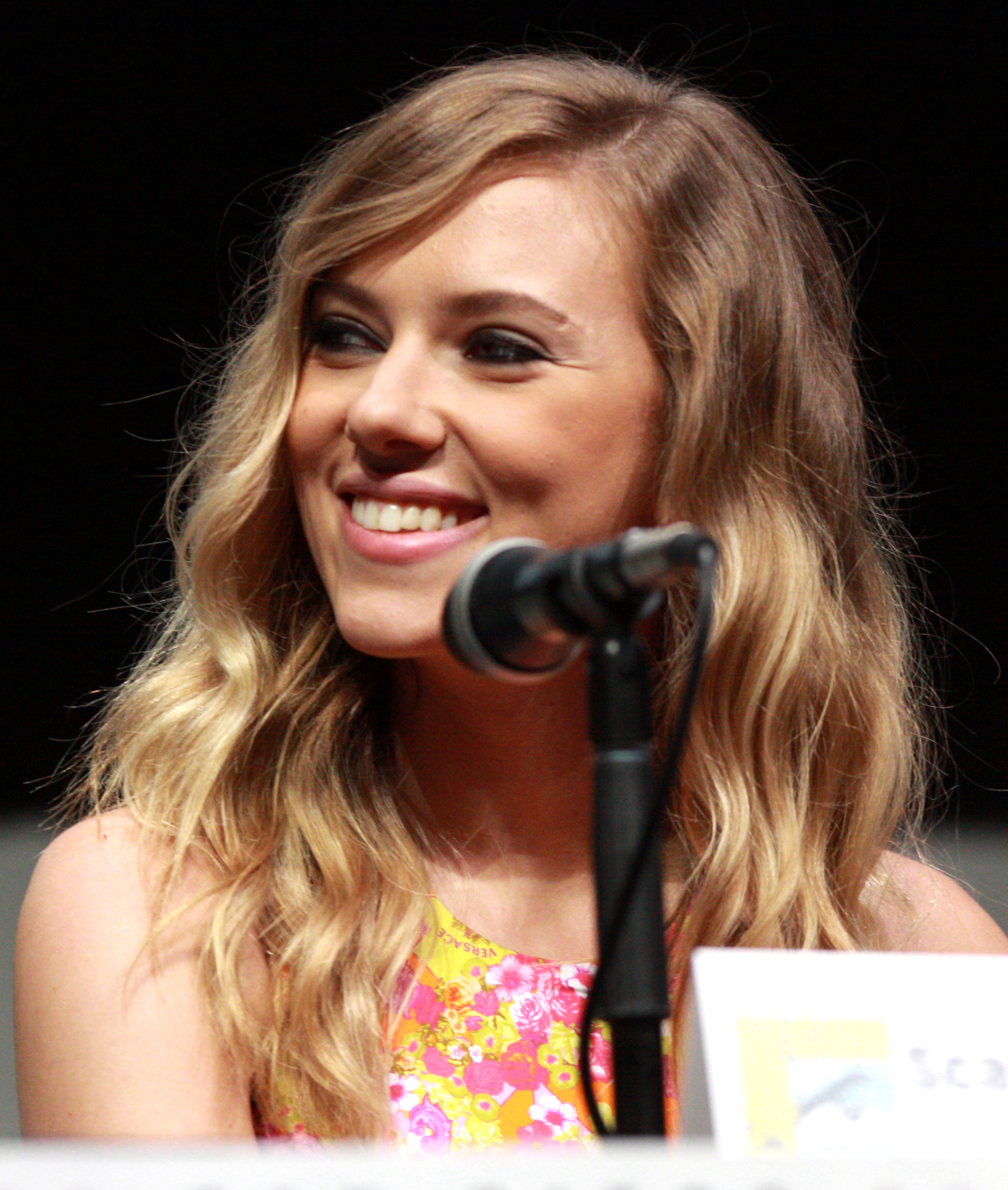
The Perfect Score marks the first of nine movies Chris Evans and Scarlett Johansson star in together.
- Chris Evans as Kyle
- Erika Christensen as Anna Ross
- Bryan Greenberg as Matty
- Scarlett Johansson as Francesca Curtis
- Darius Miles as Desmond Rhodes
- Leonardo Nam as Roy
- Matthew Lillard as Larry
- Fulvio Cecere as Mr. Curtis
- Vanessa Angel as Anita Donlee
- Lorena Gale as Ms. Proctor
- Tyra Ferrell as Mrs. Rhodes

== Production ==
In February 1998, it was announced Paramount Pictures had acquired the project from Caravan Pictures for a low six figures.

== Reception ==
=== Critical response ===
On Rotten Tomatoes, the film holds an approval rating of 15% based on 108 reviews, with an average rating of 3.8/10. The website's critics consensus reads, "Neither funny nor suspenseful, this heist/teen flick also fails to explore its potentially socially relevant premise." Metacritic assigned the film a weighted average score of 35 out of 100, based on 25 critics, indicating "generally unfavorable reviews". Audiences polled by CinemaScore gave the film an average grade of "B" on an A+ to F scale.

Slant Magazine critic Keith Uhlich called it an "MTV film that extreme right-wing moralists can be proud of, as it posits a quintessentially American world of racial, intellectual, and sexual conformity." Many compared the film unfavorably with The Breakfast Club, and many even called it a rip-off. Entertainment Weekly wrote the film off as being "like The Breakfast Club recast as a video game for simpletons." Likewise, Roger Ebert awarded the film two stars out of four, calling the film "too palatable. It maintains a tone of light seriousness, and it depends on the caper for too much of its entertainment value." Ebert's review went on to point out that The Perfect Score was given a wide release, but that Better Luck Tomorrow, a teen drama film that received much more acclaim, was given a very limited release.

=== Box office ===
The film opened in 2,208 theaters and grossed $4.8 million, making for a $2,207 per-theater average. Placing fifth over the weekend, the film saw sharp declines in the following weeks and ended its domestic run with $10.3 million.

== Soundtrack ==
The Perfect Score (Original Motion Picture Score)

Film score by John Murphy
- Released: 2004

The Perfect Score (Original Motion Picture Score)
No.	Title	Artists	Length
1.	"Everything"	Fefe Dobson
2.	"Teenage Alien Nation"	American Hi-Fi
3.	"Paranoia"	Sam Roberts
4.	"Because I Got High"	Afroman
5.	"Unforgiven"	Fefe Dobson
6.	"The World Outside"	Paloalto
7.	"Get Low"	Lil Jon & the East Side Boyz featuring Ying Yang Twins
8.	"Rush Hour Soul"	Supergrass
9.	"Force Marker"	Brian Eno
10.	"All My Life"	Foo Fighters
11.	"Burning"	Benny Cassette
12.	"Last Way Out of Here"	Paloalto
13.	"Crash & Burn"	Simple Plan
14.	"Just So You Know"	Holly Palmer
15.	"In This Diary"	The Ataris
