= Everything (Fefe Dobson song) =

2004 single by Fefe Dobson

Single by Fefe Dobson

from the album Fefe Dobson
- Released: January 19, 2004
- Genre: Hard rock
- Length: 4:12 (album version); 3:42 (edit)
- Label: Island
- Songwriters: Fefe Dobson; Jay Levine; James Bryan McCollum
- Producers: Jay Levine; James Bryan McCollum

Fefe Dobson singles chronology
"Take Me Away" (2003)	"Everything" (2004)	"Don't Go (Girls and Boys)" (2004)

Music video
- "Everything" (Performance Version, No Film Footage) on YouTube VEVO (FefeDobson Channel)

"Everything" is a song written by Fefe Dobson, Jay Levine, and James Bryan McCollum and recorded by Dobson for her self-titled debut album (2003). It was released as the album's second international single and third overall single on January 19, 2004. "Everything" was the only single from the album not to appear on the Canadian Singles Chart, but it did reach number nine on the Radio & Records Canada Hot AC chart and number 13 on the Canada CHR/Pop chart. The song is Dobson's only track to chart in the United Kingdom, peaking at number 42.

== Promotion ==
Fefe Dobson has made appearances on MTV's Total Request Live, The Ellen DeGeneres Show, The Sharon Osbourne Show, All That, and The Tonight Show with Jay Leno to promote "Everything".

=== Use in media ===
The song was used and included on the soundtrack of the 2004 film The Perfect Score. It was also used in the tenth episode of the first season of The WB's series One Tree Hill, titled "You Gotta Go There to Come Back", which originally aired on January 20, 2004

== Critical reception ==
Spin wrote that the song was a "shameless Avril rip" and listed it in the "Trash" section of their music list. Chuck Taylor of Billboard also likened the song to Avril Lavigne's music and wrote that "Everything" was "less distinctive" than Dobson's other songs and "could go either way." In a review of Fefe Dobson for Billboard, Rashaun Hall cited "Everything" as an example of the "standard pop fare" that bogs down sections of the album.

== Music video ==
The song's music video, directed by Chris Robinson, stars some of the actors from the film The Perfect Score and includes scenes from the film. An alternate version omits the movie scenes.

== Track listings ==
UK CD1

1. "Everything" (radio edit)
2. "Meet Fefe Dobson!"
3. "Everything" (instrumental)
4. "Everything" (video)

UK CD2

1. "Everything" (radio edit)
2. "Meet Fefe Dobson!"

== Charts ==
Chart (2004)	Peak position
Canada CHR/Pop Top 30 (Radio & Records)	13
Canada Hot AC Top 30 (Radio & Records)	9
Romania (Romanian Top 100)	74
Scotland Singles (OCC)	48
UK Singles (OCC)	42
US Adult Pop Airplay (Billboard)	28
US Pop Airplay (Billboard)	39

== Release history ==
Region	Date	Format	Label(s)	Ref.
United States	January 19, 2004	Contemporary hit radio	Island; IDJMG	
United States	January 19, 2004	Hot adult contemporary radio	Island; IDJMG	
United Kingdom	April 26, 2004	CD single	Mercury	
