= Fefe Dobson =

Canadian singer (born 1985)

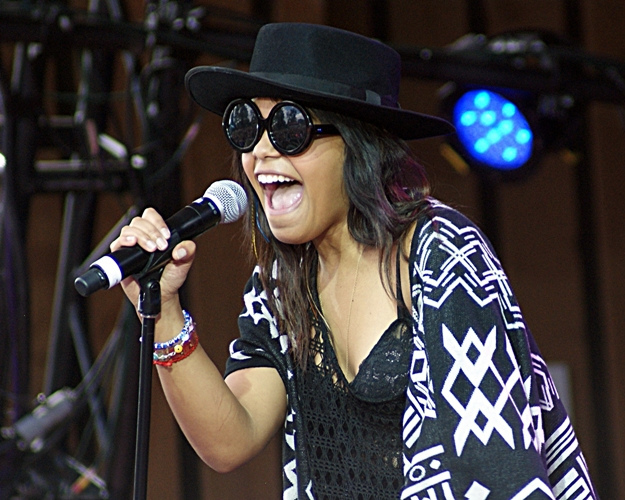
- Dobson in 2011

Background information
- Born: Felicia Lily Dobson; February 28, 1985 (age 41); Scarborough, Toronto, Ontario, Canada
- Genres: Pop rock; pop punk; power pop
- Occupations: Singer; songwriter
- Instrument: Vocals
- Years active: 2003–present
- Labels: Island; 21
- Member of: Artists Against Bullying
- Spouse: Yelawolf (m. 2019)
- Website: fefemusic.com

Felicia Lily Dobson (born February 28, 1985) is a Canadian singer. Born in Toronto, Ontario, she began performing as a teenager, during which time she received and refused an offer from Jive Records for a recording contract. Dobson signed with Island/Def Jam soon after and released her self-titled debut album (2003), which saw the success of the single "Bye Bye Boyfriend" on the Canadian Hot 100 chart and for which she received a Juno Award nomination.

Dobson's second studio album Sunday Love was originally scheduled for release in 2005, but after complications during production, its mainstream release was cancelled and she left her record label due to creative differences (later made available digitally in 2012). She was re-signed to Island Records during production of her third studio album Joy (2010), whose singles "Ghost" and "Stuttering" saw continued success in Canada.

== Early life ==
Dobson was born on February 28, 1985, in Scarborough, Ontario, a suburb of Toronto. Dobson's mother is of English, Dutch, First Nations, and Irish ancestry and her father is of Jamaican heritage. During her childhood, she took singing lessons at the New Conservatory of Music in Agincourt, Scarborough to improve her singing. Fefe Dobson graduated from Heritage Park Public School. She went to high school at Wexford Collegiate Institute.

Dobson began sending demo tapes – recorded on a home karaoke machine – to many recording companies in North America when she was 11 years old. Then at the age of 13, she started playing the piano. Before Dobson was signed, she said that she had been stereotyped as a contemporary R&B or popular music singer instead of a rock musician due to her race, often being compared to Brandy Norwood and Britney Spears. Dobson started writing music at the age of 13 years, and the company Jive Records attempted to develop her as a popular musician, which she eventually refused. After that experience, Dobson met Jay Levine and contracted with Nelly Furtado's manager Chris Smith. Smith arranged showcases with several recording companies. Universal Music Canada president Randy Lennox showed interest in her, and persuaded Island Def Jam CEO Lyor Cohen and his manager of A&R, Jeff Fenster, to fly to Toronto for another showcase. Dobson played a showcase for Island/Def Jam; about 30 seconds into the first song – a punk thrash track about longing, titled "Stupid Little Love Song" – the executives contracted her.

== Music career ==
=== 2003–2008: Fefe Dobson and Sunday Love ===
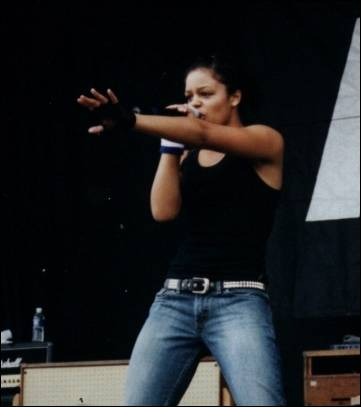
Dobson performing live in 2004

Dobson's self-titled debut album was released December 9, 2003, by Island Records, and sold 307,000 copies in the United States, according to Nielsen SoundScan. The album debuted at number one on the Billboard Heatseekers Albums Chart. Three singles were released from the album: "Bye Bye Boyfriend", "Take Me Away", and "Everything". Two of the album's tracks, "Everything" and "Unforgiven", were used in the film The Perfect Score. During much of 2004, Dobson promoted her debut album, performing live on the program Total Request Live and appearing in numerous magazines. She was also the opening act of Justin Timberlake's European tour. That July, she released the single, "Don't Go (Girls and Boys)", which was featured in a Tommy Hilfiger commercial featuring the singer. The album was later reissued with the single added. Dobson also had a new song, "If You Walk Away", on the soundtrack of Raising Helen. Dobson was an endorser for the Got Milk? organization.

In April 2005, Dobson was nominated for two Juno Awards, Pop Album of the Year and New Artist of the Year. During the summer of 2005, Dobson was in a public service ad: "Make Poverty History", which brings awareness to child poverty worldwide.

In 2005, Dobson released the single "Don't Let It Go to Your Head" followed by "This Is My Life" the following year. When both singles failed to chart, Island Records dropped her from the label and canceled the major label release of Dobson's second studio album, Sunday Love. "My real good fans, my hardcore fans, have it, so that's most important," Dobson said, referring to the album leaking on the internet. "But instead of sitting there and being depressed and begging people for the record, I went back to the studio, got people that I knew, friends that I knew, and I started again." Sunday Love eventually received a wide digital release on December 18, 2012. One song from the album, "Be Strong", featured on the soundtrack for the film It's a Boy Girl Thing.

"Start All Over", a song co-written by Dobson and featured her background vocals, was recorded by Miley Cyrus for her album Hannah Montana 2: Meet Miley Cyrus (2007) and was released as a single, reaching number 57 on the Billboard Pop 100. "Don't Let It Go to Your Head" was covered by Rockett Queen on their album Kiss and Tell (2008) and Jordin Sparks on her second album Battlefield (2009). Shortly after Sparks' album was released Dobson said, "She did kind of, like, a more R&B version of it, which I think is really nice, actually." Sparks' version was released as a single in the UK on January 4, 2010. The track "As a Blonde" was covered on the Selena Gomez & the Scene album Kiss & Tell (2009).

=== 2009–2012: Joy ===
On August 11, 2009, Dobson presented a showcase performance at the Mercury Lounge in New York City. Dobson performed during the 2009 MTV Video Music Awards weekend at The Fillmore New York at Irving Plaza on Friday night, September 11, at "A Concert with Fefe Dobson and Cobra Starship." She was also one of the judges for a competition for MTV's "VMA Best Breakout New York City Artist Award" that occurred at the same event. Dobson attended the 2009 MTV Video Music Awards held on September 13 in New York City at Radio City Music Hall. On Sunday, September 27, 2009, she performed the promotional single "I Want You" at the finale of the second season of the Canadian Cable TV show The Next Star. The song was used in promotion for the movie Whip It. She performed in Perth, Australia, at the One Movement Showcase Music Festival on October 17, 2009. Dobson was the headline performer for one of the National Breast Cancer Awareness Month events, a benefit concert held at the Hard Rock Cafe in Hollywood, CA on October 22, 2009. She performed at a 100 Day Countdown event to the 2010 Winter Olympics at the Canadian Embassy in Washington, D.C., USA on November 4, 2009.

Dobson performed on February 20, 2010, at Nathan Phillips Square in Toronto, Ontario, as part of CTV's national celebration of the 2010 Winter Olympics. She was one of the opening acts for The Barenaked Ladies in the all Canadian show. She participated in the Canadian all-star benefit song cover of K'naan's single "Wavin' Flag" for Haiti released under the collaboration name of Young Artists for Haiti; it was released on March 12, 2010. Dobson's involvement with the Olympics continued on March 12, 2010, as she performed "I Want You" and "Watch Me Move" at the Opening Ceremonies for the 2010 Paralympic Winter Games. She covered "River Deep – Mountain High" for the Rock and Roll Hall of Fame's 25th annual induction ceremony at the Waldorf-Astoria Hotel in New York City on March 15, 2010. Dobson performed on a twenty city tour across Canada in March and April 2010 on Hedley's The Show Must Go...On The Road Tour.

Joy, Dobson's third studio album, was released on November 22, 2010, after taking almost four years to complete. The album was preceded by the release of the two buzz singles "Watch Me Move" and "I Want You", which were then followed-up by the three top 20 singles "Ghost", "Stuttering" and "Can't Breathe". The singer performed her single "Stuttering" on the November 10, 2010, broadcast of The CW Television Network series, Hellcats. She released the album's third single, "Can't Breathe" in March 2011. It peaked at number 19 on the Canadian Hot 100.

She performed at the 2010 Toronto International Film Festival in September 2010. That year, Dobson co-wrote Selena Gomez & The Scene's single "Round & Round", from their second studio album, A Year Without Rain.

=== 2013–present: Single releases and Emotion Sickness ===
On January 22, 2013, Dobson announced that recording had begun for her fourth studio album, later revealed to be titled Firebird. The album's intended lead single "Legacy" was released on August 6, 2013, while the song "Celebrate" was released February 11, 2014. Firebird did not see a release and the project was canceled.

In early July 2013, Dobson got engaged to American rapper Yelawolf; the pair were married on September 27, 2019, in Nashville, Tennessee. On April 29, 2014, Dobson performed live during the Count Me In conference global broadcast, filmed at the Sony Centre for the Performing Arts.

In early 2022, Dobson confirmed her return to music with the single "FCKN IN LOVE", which was released on 25 February 2022. In 2023, she participated in an all-star recording of Serena Ryder's single "What I Wouldn't Do", which was released as a charity single to benefit Kids Help Phone's Feel Out Loud campaign for youth mental health. Dobson released her fourth studio album, Emotion Sickness, on September 29, 2023. It was preceded by the single "I Can't Love Him (And Love You Too)".

== Artistry ==
=== Musical style ===
Fefe Dobson's self-titled debut album is generally pop-rock, as well as some traces of punk music. Several songs on the album are also in an acoustic format, stripped down to just Dobson and the guitar. The music was different from most music put out at the time, such as recent releases by Britney Spears and Christina Aguilera. In fact, Dobson originally signed with Jive Records, who intended to make her the next big pop star. However, Dobson did not want to be a pop-star and wanted to make her own type of music, and quickly left the label. On Dobson's second album Joy, she worked with producers David Lichens, Jon Levine, Howard Benson and Bob Ezrin - living up to the portraits of her heroes she first hung during the recording of her first album: Kurt Cobain, Judy Garland, Coldplay, The Vines and Jeff Buckley. Dobson co-wrote most of the songs on the album - usually composing on guitar, her instrument of choice. "I play the few chords that I know," she says. "I try to write melodies off the same chords. Joy is written with about three chords, and an extra one in the bridge." Sonically the album was rooted alternative rock.

=== Influences ===
Dobson has said that John Lennon and Judy Garland are her primary musical influences, and that her biggest musical inspiration growing up was Michael Jackson: "I swore I was Michael [Jackson]. Then I found out I wasn't Michael [Jackson] and it broke my heart." She also mentions Janet Jackson as a primary influence. At the same time, she went to "every 'N Sync concert there was." Dobson indicated that she would like to work with Jack White, the White Stripes/Raconteurs frontman, because she admires him for his ability to make his ragged rock music become radio-style.

== Filmography ==
Film
| Year | Title | Role | Ref. |
|---|---|---|---|
| 2012 | Home Again | Cherry C. | |
| 2012 | Christmas in Compton | Kim | |
| 2024 | Morningside | Steph | |

Television
| Year | Title | Role | Notes | Ref. |
|---|---|---|---|---|
| 2003 | All That | Musical Guest | Season 9, Episode 5 | |
| 2004 | American Dreams | Tina Turner | Episode: "Stewart's Charge" | |
| 2010 | True Jackson VP | Herself | Episode: "Mad Rocks"' | |
| 2010 | Hellcats | Herself | Episode: "Finish What We Started" | |
| 2011 | Wingin' It | Herself | Episode: "Best Before Date" | |
| 2012 | The Listener | Jade | Episode: "Curtain Call" | |
| 2013 | Degrassi: The Next Generation | Herself | Episode: "Summertime: Part 1" | |
| 2021 | Canada's Drag Race | Guest judge | Episode: "Screech!" | |

== Discography ==
- Fefe Dobson (2003)
- Joy (2010)
- Sunday Love (2012)
- Emotion Sickness (2023)

== Awards and nominations ==
| Year | Award | Nominated work | Result |
|---|---|---|---|
| 2003 | CASBY Award for Favourite New Single | "Bye Bye Boyfriend" | Nominated |
| 2004 | Canadian Radio Music Award for Best New Solo Artist [CHR (Top 40)] | "Take Me Away" | Nominated |
| 2004 | MuchMusic Video Awards for Best Pop Video | "Take Me Away" | Won |
| 2004 | Muchmusic Video Awards for People's Choice Favourite Canadian Artist | "Take Me Away" | Won |
| 2005 | Juno Award for Pop Album of the Year | Fefe Dobson | Nominated |
| 2005 | Juno Award for New Artist of the Year | Herself | Nominated |
| 2011 | Much Music Video Awards for Video of the Year | "Ghost" | Nominated |
| 2011 | Much Music Video Awards for Pop Video of the Year | "Ghost" | Nominated |
| 2011 | Much Music Video Awards for International Video by a Canadian | "Stuttering" | Nominated |
| 2011 | Much Music Video Awards for "Ur Fave Video" | "Stuttering" | Won |
| 2012 | Canadian Radio Music Awards – Chart Topper | Fefe Dobson | Won |
| 2012 | Canadian Radio Music Awards – Fan Favourite | "Stuttering" | Won |
| 2012 | Canadian Radio Music Awards – SOCAN Song of the Year | "Stuttering" | Won |
