= Décompte MusiquePlus =

- Genre: Music
- Country of origin: Canada
- Original language: French

Original release
- Network: MusiquePlus

Décompte is the MusiquePlus Top 20 Countdown. Starting 21 August 2012, the name was changed to Décompte MusiquePlus. It is a ninety-minute music video program block, that airs on French Canadian music television station MusiquePlus.

== Number ones ==
Here is a listing of number ones from January 2011 onwards:

=== 2011 ===
Date	weeks	Song	Performer
08.01.2011	1	"Raise Your Glass"	Pink
15.01.2011	1	"Firework"	Katy Perry
22.01.2011	1	"What's My Name?"	Rihanna feat. Drake
29.01.2011	1	"The Time (Dirty Bit)"	The Black Eyed Peas
05.02.2011	1	"We R Who We R"	Ke$ha
12.02.2011	1	"Grenade"	Bruno Mars
19.02.2011	1	"Looks Minus Substance"	The New Cities
26.02.2011	1	"Higher"	Taio Cruz
05.03.2011	1	"Bumpy Ride"	Mohombi
12.03.2011	1	"Chasser le malheur"	Alfa Rococo
19.03.2011	1	"What the Hell"	Avril Lavigne
26.03.2011	1	"Who's That Chick?"	David Guetta feat. Rihanna
02.04.2011	1	"Price Tag"	Jessie J feat. B.o.B
09.04.2011	1	"Hold It Against Me"	Britney Spears
16.04.2011	1	"Mauve"	Ariel
23.04.2011	1	No chart	
30.04.2011	1	"Sleepwalker"	Adam Lambert
07.05.2011	1	"Hear Me Now"	Hollywood Undead
14.05.2011	1	"Party Rock Anthem"	LMFAO feat. Lauren Bennett and GoonRock
21.05.2011	1	"Mr. Saxobeat"	Alexandra Stan
28.05.2011	1	"Till the World Ends"	Britney Spears
04.06.2011	1	"Jamais su"	Anodajay
11.06.2011	1	"La femme de ma vie"	Ale Dee feat Miray
18.06.2011	1	"La Mer"	Jack
25.06.2011	1	"Synesthésie"	Malajube
02.07.2011	1	"Mettez des bombes dans mes oreilles"	eXterio
09.07.2011	1	"Jet Lag" (French language version)	Simple Plan with Marie-Mai
16.07.2011	1	"So Far Away"	Avenged Sevenfold
23.07.2011	1	"Give Me Everything"	Pitbull featuring Ne-Yo, Afrojack, and Nayer
30.07.2011	1	"Run the World (Girls)"	Beyoncé Knowles
06.08.2011	1	"Piste 1"	Galaxie
13.08.2011	1	"The Edge of Glory"	Lady Gaga
20.08.2011	1	"Don't Wanna Go Home"	Jason Derülo
27.08.2011	1	"Météore"	Alfa Rococo
03.09.2011	1	"Smile"	Avril Lavigne
10.09.2011	1	"I Wanna Go"	Britney Spears
17.09.2011	1	"Last Friday Night (T.G.I.F.)"	Katy Perry
24.09.2011	1	"Heatwave"	The New Cities
01.10.2011	1	"Monster"	Paramore
08.10.2011	1	"Yoü And I"	Lady Gaga
15.10.2011	1	"You Make Me Feel..."	Cobra Starship
22.10.2011	1	"Facteur temps"	Ok Volca
29.10.2011	1	"Champagne Showers"	LMFAO feat. Natalia Kills
05.11.2011	1	"Up All Night"	Blink-182
12.11.2011	1	"Folle de toi"	Raffy
19.11.2011	1	"Astronaut"	Simple Plan
26.11.2011	1	"Sexy and I Know It"	LMFAO
03.12.2011	1	"Wish You Were Here"	Avril Lavigne
10.12.2011	1	"Invincible"	Hedley
17.12.2011	1	"Adieu"	Cœur de pirate
24.12.2011	1	No chart	
31.12.2011	1	No chart	

=== 2012 ===
Date	weeks	Song	Performer
07.01.2012	1	"Criminal"	Britney Spears
14.01.2012	1	"Without You"	David Guetta feat. Usher
21.01.2012	1	"The Hype"	The New Cities
28.01.2012	1	"The One That Got Away"	Katy Perry
04.02.2012	1	"Marry the Night" (Long version)	Lady Gaga
11.02.2012	1	"Cargué dans ma chaise"	Radio Radio
18.02.2012	1	"International Love"	Pitbull feat. Chris Brown
25.02.2012	1	"Not Just You"	Cody Simpson
03.03.2012	1	"One Life"	Hedley
10.03.2012	1	"You Da One"	Rihanna
17.03.2012	3	"What Makes You Beautiful"	One Direction
07.04.2012	1	"Call Me Maybe"	Carly Rae Jepsen
14.04.2012	1	"Sorry for Party Rocking"	LMFAO
21.04.2012	1	"Wild Ones"	Flo Rida feat. Sia
28.04.2012	1	"Glad You Came"	The Wanted
05.05.2012	1	"We Are Young"	fun. feat. Janelle Monáe
12.05.2012	1	"Part of Me"	Katy Perry
19.05.2012	1	"Summer Paradise"	Simple Plan
26.05.2012	1	"One Thing"	One Direction
02.06.2012	1	"Titanium"	David Guetta feat. Sia
09.06.2012	1	"Summer Paradise"	Simple Plan
16.06.2012	1	"Aujourd'hui, ma vie c'est d'la marde"	Lisa LeBlanc
23.06.2012	1	"Boyfriend"	Justin Bieber
30.06.2012	1	"Starships"	Nicki Minaj
07.07.2012	1	"Turn Up the Music"	Chris Brown
14.07.2012	1	"Where Have You Been"	Rihanna
21.07.2012	1	"Payphone"	Maroon 5
28.07.2012	1	"Back in Time"	Pitbull
04.08.2012	1	No chart	
11.08.2012	1	"Whistle"	Flo Rida
18.08.2012	1	"Chasing the Sun"	The Wanted

Renamed Décompte MusiquePlus

Date	weeks	Song	Performer
25.08.2012			
