= Goodbye, You Suck =

Single by Shiloh

from the album Picture Imperfect
- Released: March 10, 2009
- Recorded: 2008
- Genre: Pop-punk
- Length: 3:29
- Label: Universal Republic
- Songwriters: Shiloh, Rob Wells
- Producer: Rob Wells

Shiloh singles chronology
"Operator (A Girl Like Me)" (2008)	"Goodbye, You Suck" (2009)	"Alright" (2009)

Music video
- "Goodbye, You Suck" on YouTube

"Goodbye, You Suck" is the second single by Canadian pop/rock singer Shiloh. The song is about ignorance, greed, and lying in a relationship. It made the Canadian Hot 100 for one week at number 73. A music video for the single, directed by Aaron A, features Shiloh performing with her band and some dancers as the Shiloh logo is scattered around the set.

== Critical reception ==
Jason Birchmeier of AllMusic compared the song to the previous single "Operator (A Girl Like Me)", calling it "similarly impressive, once again skipping along during the verse before the synth-powered chorus kicks in."

== Music video ==
The music video was released in February 2009. Directed by Aaron A (who previously directed the video for "Operator (A Girl Like Me)", the video features Shiloh with her band and some dancers with the Shiloh logo scattered around the set. She performs the song as she would on stage. Before the last chorus the lights turn on and off very quickly.

The video gave Shiloh a nomination for UR FAVE New Artist of the Year at the 2009 MuchMusic Video Awards but lost to The Midway State's "Never Again".

== Credits and personnel ==
Credits adapted from the liner notes of Picture Imperfect.

Recording

- Chris Anderson: engineer, production (Definitive Sound Studio)

Personnel

- Dan Kanter: guitar
- Rob Wells: other instruments

== Charts ==
Chart performance for "Goodbye, You Suck"
Chart (2009)	Peak position
Canada Hot 100 (Billboard)	73
