= The Latency (album) =

2009 album by The Latency

Studio album by The Latency
- Released: September 8, 2009
- Studio: Mushroom Studios (Vancouver)
- Genre: Pop rock; pop punk
- Length: 39:16
- Label: MapleMusic Recordings
- Producer: Tommy Mac

The Latency chronology
Chomp!! (2008)	The Latency (2009)

Singles from The Latency
- 1. "Tonight, I Love You" Released: December 2008; 2. "Kids" Released: May 26, 2009; 3. "All You Need" Released: July 24, 2009; 4. "Fork in the Road" Released: February 16, 2010

The Latency is the only studio album by Canadian pop rock band The Latency. The album was released on September 8, 2009, via MapleMusic Recordings. On September 1, the album was made available for streaming exclusively through MuchMusic.

== Background ==
On July 1, 2008, The Latency released their debut EP, Chomp!!, which contained the tracks "Tonight, I Love You", "Kids", "Can You Hear Me Call?", "Breathe", "Hello" and "Cry Me Out". These songs were later included on The Latency, along with six other new tracks. The band signed with MapleMusic Recordings in 2009, following the success of their debut single, "Tonight, I Love You". The album was produced by bassist Tommy Mac of Hedley, who also serves as the band's manager. The album was recorded at Mushroom Studios in Vancouver, British Columbia. All tracks were written by the band, with "Tonight, I Love You" and "Kids" being co-written by Jacob Hoggard and Mac. Songs from the album were written from past experiences lead vocalist Brandon Lehti had had, or had seen people through, such as "Fork in the Road", which he wrote after witnessing someone he was acquainted with experienced, creating honesty in their music.

== Release ==
"Tonight, I Love You" was released in December 2008, as the lead single from the album. The song peaked at number 93 on the Canadian Hot 100. The music video premiered on MuchMusic on April 2, 2009, and reached number one on the MuchMusic Countdown. "Kids" was serviced to contemporary hit radio on May 26, 2009, and was released as the album's second single. A music video for the song was released in August 2009 and was directed by John Poliquin. "All You Wanted" was released as the album's third single and premiered on MuchMusic on July 24, 2009. The song was released for radio airplay on August 16. The fourth and final single, "Fork in the Road" was released on February 16, 2010. The music video was released on February 18, 2010.

== Promotion ==
In support of the album, the band toured with Simple Plan, Marianas Trench and Plain White T's. They also joined Shiloh on the Scene tour in September 2009. In April 2010, the group embarked on the SASS tour, performing at every school in Ontario. From April to May 2010, the band supported Faber Drive on the Can't Keep a Secret tour along with These Kids Wear Crowns, Jesse Labelle and The New Cities.

== Critical reception ==
In a negative review written by Chart Attack, one writer wrote, "Pathetic, little, whiny emo brats like these guys are the reason rock 'n' roll no longer has any balls. Whatever."

== Accolades ==
In 2010, The Latency was nominated for Pop Recording of the Year at the Western Canadian Music Awards.

== Track listing ==
All tracks are written by The Latency expect where noted.

No.	Title	Writer(s)	Length
1.	"Can You Hear Me Call?"		3:27
2.	"All You Wanted"		3:23
3.	"Tonight, I Love You"	Brandon Lehti; Ryan Stead; Mathew Gendron; Jonny Wiebe; Jacob Hoggard; Tommy Mac	3:45
4.	"Away"		3:23
5.	"Cry Me Out"		3:19
6.	"Don't Go"		3:45
7.	"Breathe"		3:42
8.	"How's It Feel"		2:58
9.	"Fork in the Road"		3:32
10.	"Kids"	Lehti; Stead; Gendron; Wiebe; Hoggard; Mac	3:02
11.	"Hello"		2:54
12.	"Still in Love (With You)"		3:46
Total length:			39:16

== Personnel ==
Credits for The Latency adapted from album's liner notes.

The Latency

- Brandon Lehti – lead vocals, rhythm guitar
- Ryan Stead – lead guitar, backing vocals
- Mathew Gendron – bass guitar, backing vocals
- Jonny Wiebe – drums, percussion

Production

- Dean Maher – engineering, mixing
- Joao Carvalho – mastering
- Tommy Mac – producer

== Release history ==
Release dates and formats for The Latency
Region	Date	Format	Label	Ref.
Canada	September 8, 2009	CD; digital download	MapleMusic	
Various	December 7, 2010	Digital download	MapleMusic	
