= Bay station =

Toronto subway station

Bay
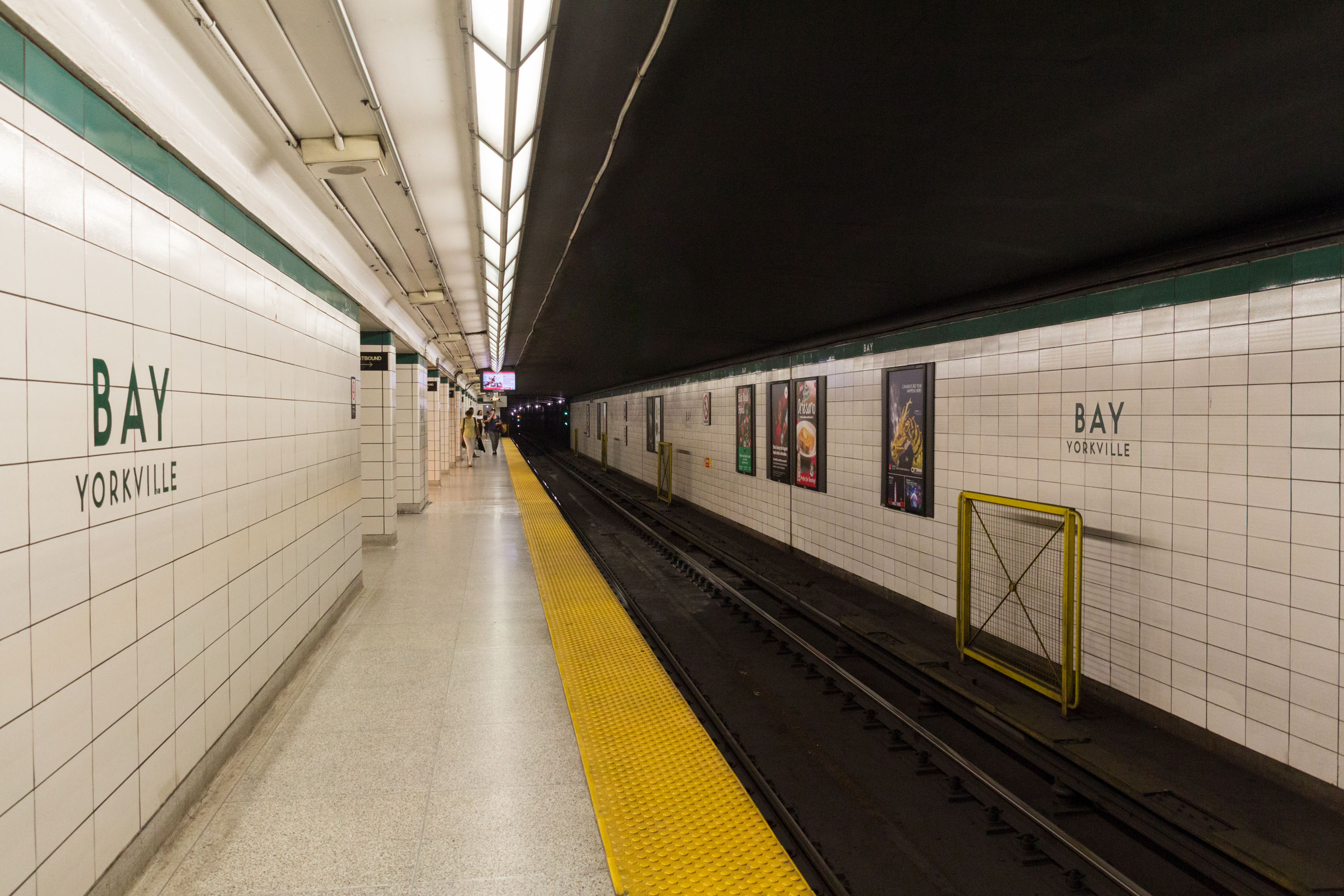

General information
- Location: 1240 Bay Street; Toronto, Ontario; Canada
- Coordinates: 43°40′13″N 79°23′25″W
- Platforms: Centre platform
- Connections: TTC buses: 19 Bay; 300 Bloor–Danforth

Construction
- Structure type: Underground
- Platform levels: 2
- Accessible: Yes

Other information
- Website: Official station page

History
- Opened: February 26, 1966; 60 years ago

Passengers
- 2023–2024: 20,980
- Rank: 31 of 70

Services
Preceding station	Toronto Transit Commission	Following station
St. George towards Kipling	Line 2 Bloor–Danforth	Yonge towards Kennedy
Track layout
Upper level
Lower level (disused) "Lower Bay"
Location

Bay is a subway station on Line 2 Bloor–Danforth in Toronto, Ontario, Canada. It is located in the heart of the Yorkville district just north of Bloor Street West on the west side of Bay Street.

The Toronto Transit Commission (TTC) operates its lost articles office at this station, where forgotten objects on the city's buses and trains are held until reclaimed or sold by auction.

== History ==
Bay station opened in 1966 as part of the original segment of the Bloor–Danforth line, from Keele in the west to Woodbine in the east. Early plans of the line, and even some published maps, named this station "Yorkville"; the platform signs read "BAY" in large type, with a smaller "YORKVILLE" caption underneath. Work commenced in August 2019 to make Bay station wheelchair accessible; this work was completed on December 30, 2020.

=== Lower Bay ===
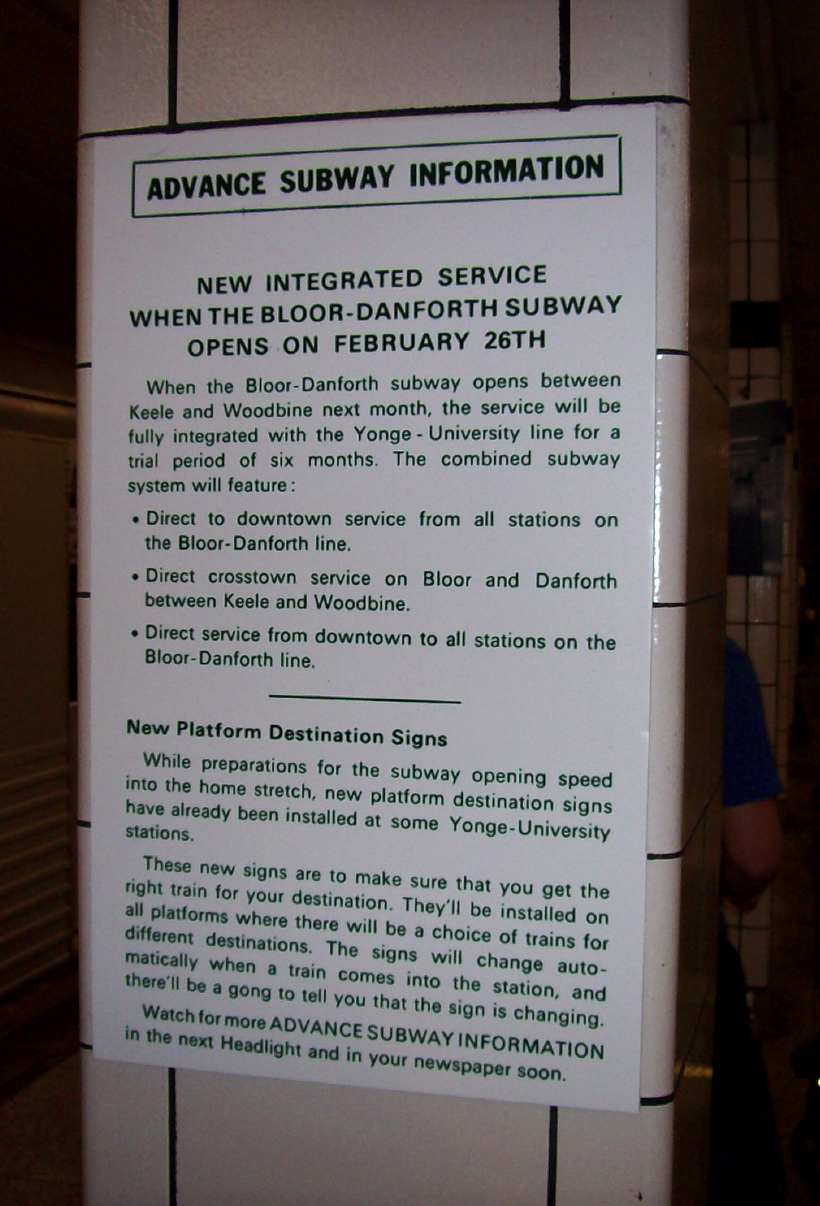
Lower Bay signage from 1966, when the TTC was about to open the Bloor–Danforth subway line

Below the main platform for Bay station is an abandoned platform, which was used for only six months in 1966 when the TTC experimentally ran trains whose routes included portions of both the Yonge–University and Bloor–Danforth lines. This abandoned platform is sometimes referred to as "Lower Bay" by the general public or "Bay Lower" by the TTC.

The platform was in service from February to September 1966 as part of an interlining experiment, in which the TTC ran trains along three routes, with one matching the subsequent Bloor–Danforth line, and the other two combining parts of the Bloor–Danforth line with the Yonge–University line. The experiment was deemed a failure, largely because delays anywhere quickly cascaded to affect the entire system. Also, as the stations had not been laid out effectively for cross-platform interchange, trains travelling east from St. George and west from Yonge alternated between the two levels, leading passengers to wait on the stairs in-between the levels, since they were unable to tell which platform would receive the next train.

With every station served by at least two routes (Bloor–Yonge station was served by all three routes, with the Yonge–University–Danforth route passing through it twice, once on each level), passengers could travel between any two stations without changing trains; though for some station combinations, such as travel between a station north of Bloor and one on the Bloor–Danforth route, transferring at Bloor–Yonge station resulted in a more direct path. The TTC found that when the extra time waiting for a train from the correct route was considered, the time savings were not significant.

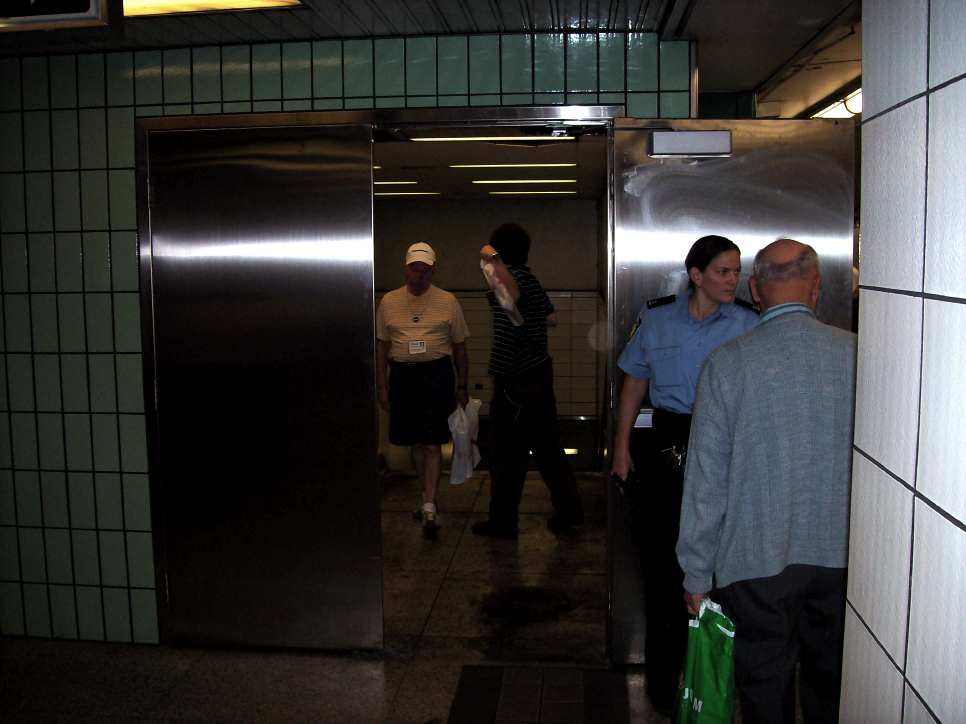
Cumberland exit from Lower Bay station on the Upper Bay platform, May 26, 2007

Much of the infrastructure for interlining is still present on the system, and most older stations still have signs informing passengers of each train's next destination, although they no longer change. While St. George and Bloor–Yonge stations remained operating upper and lower platforms for the two crossing subway lines, Bay station would be served by only the Bloor–Danforth line.

Lower Bay and the tracks leading to it still exist and are now used to train new operators, to move trains between the two current lines, for platform-surface experiments, and to allow filming in the subway without disrupting public service. The station has been modified several times to make it look like a "common" North American subway station, and the TTC once had an elaborate pre-built set for converting it to a New York subway station. The set was used for the filming of the movie Don't Say a Word. The TTC asked the production company if they could donate the set. The set remained up for about three weeks as a selling point for other movies but was then torn down due to safety concerns. Other notable movies shot at Lower Bay include The Taking of Pelham One Two Three, Johnny Mnemonic, Bulletproof Monk, Mimic, End of the Line, The Recruit, and most recently, in 2017, in the film The Sound, in which the Lower Bay station was the main focus and setting of the story.

The station was also used as a film set in the music video "Never Again", performed by the band the Midway State, as well as the 2015 music video for the song "Kill V. Maim" from Canadian singer and songwriter Grimes's 4th studio album Art Angels. This music video was directed by Grimes and her brother, Mac Boucher. The short film, The Last Stop, directed by Tyler Cowan, also featured the Lower Bay station as its primary location. The band Great Lake Swimmers also recorded "The Great Exhale", a song from their 2012 album New Wild Everywhere, in Lower Bay station. In 2018, the band Fucked Up headlined Canadian Music Week with a showcase show in Lower Bay station. It has also been used as training exercise location by the local army reserve.

A map of the Toronto subway routes, as they appeared during the 1966 interlining trial; all stations were served by at least two routes, allowing direct trips between any two stations. The route names and colours are derived from the official maps of the time.

==== Proposed re-activation of Lower Bay ====
In 2014, Josef Kates, an engineer, proposed reactivating Lower Bay during rush hour by having northbound University trains bypass St. George subway station and instead short turn at Bay. Kates argues this would relieve both St. George and Bloor–Yonge stations by allowing some downtown-bound passengers transferring from the Bloor–Danforth line to transfer at Bay instead of Yonge or St. George.

==== Public access ====
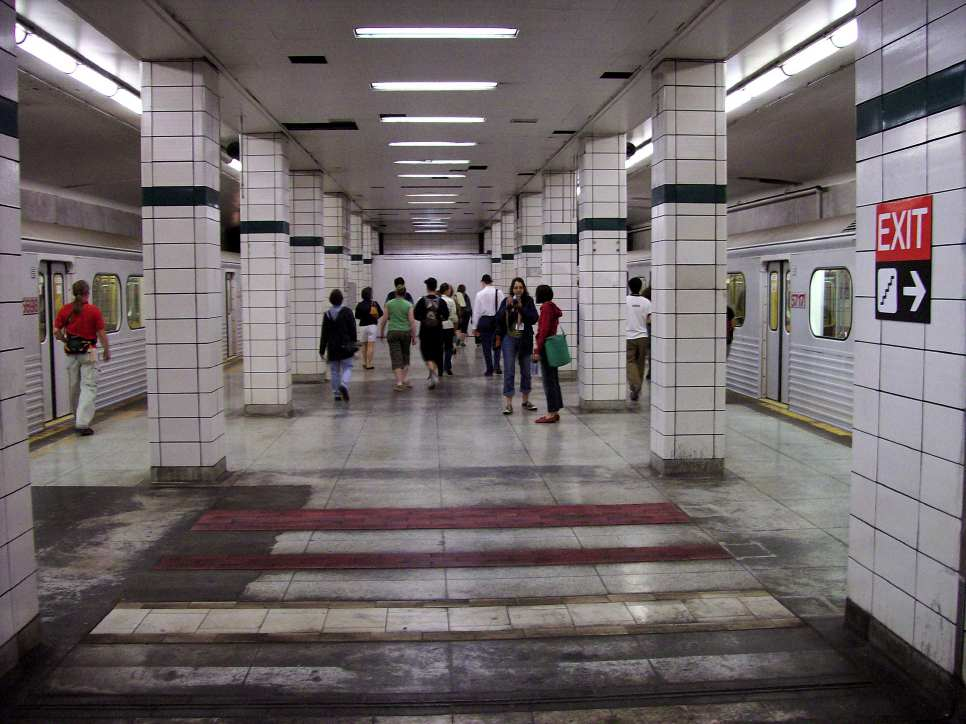
Lower Bay station during the Doors Open Toronto event on May 26, 2007

The station itself is not open to public access. During structural repairs to the tunnel roof between Bay and St. George stations, trains were bypassed to Museum station via the interlining tracks on Saturdays and Sundays from February 24 to March 11, 2007. As a result, riders could see Lower Bay through the train windows as they rode between Bloor–Yonge and Museum stations. During the May 2010 Victoria Day long weekend, the station was again used to facilitate track repairs, and once again the public got a rare opportunity to ride through the station.

The TTC announced on May 9, 2011, that due to track switch replacement on the Bloor–Danforth line between St. George and Bloor–Yonge stations, a similar subway diversion procedure would be implemented, with all eastbound and westbound trains on the Bloor–Danforth turning back at Museum station during the weekend of May 14–15, 2011 giving passengers another glimpse of Lower Bay subway station. Passengers exited the train at Museum station, crossed the centre platform, and boarded the northbound, eastbound, or westbound train to continue their subway trip. University–Spadina subway passengers travelling eastbound on the Bloor–Danforth line changed trains at Museum station. During the subway diversion, the lower level of St. George station was closed and all trains served the upper level. Upper Bay station was also closed. Regular Bloor–Danforth subway service resumed on May 16, 2011.

The TTC opened Lower Bay to the public for Doors Open Toronto on May 26, 2007. According to TTC chair Adam Giambrone's introduction leaflet, this event in 2007 was the first time since 1966 that the station's platform was open to the public. There were large line-ups, as a limited number of people were allowed on the platform at any one time. Two trains were parked on the tracks, a video screen displayed movies or commercials shot in Bay Lower, and movie posters were hung around the platform. Since 2007, the station has been open to the public periodically, often as part of subsequent Nuit Blanche and Doors Open Toronto events.

== Public art ==
As part of the TTC Public Art program and the station's accessibility modernization project, Bay station received a permanent public art installation titled confluence, unveiled on February 8, 2026. The work was created by Toronto-based artist Francisco-Fernando Granados in collaboration with architect Kurt Kraler as part of the TTC's Easier Access and Second Exit Projects.

The installation consists of a vitreous glass mosaic extending across walls, ceilings and station entrances in concentric patterns of blue, green and pink. Derived from Granados' digital drawings, the artwork was designed specifically for the station and references Toronto as a place of convergence and movement. According to the artist, the title confluence evokes both the meeting of bodies of water forming a bay and the cultural and social interactions that shape Toronto.

== Surface connections ==
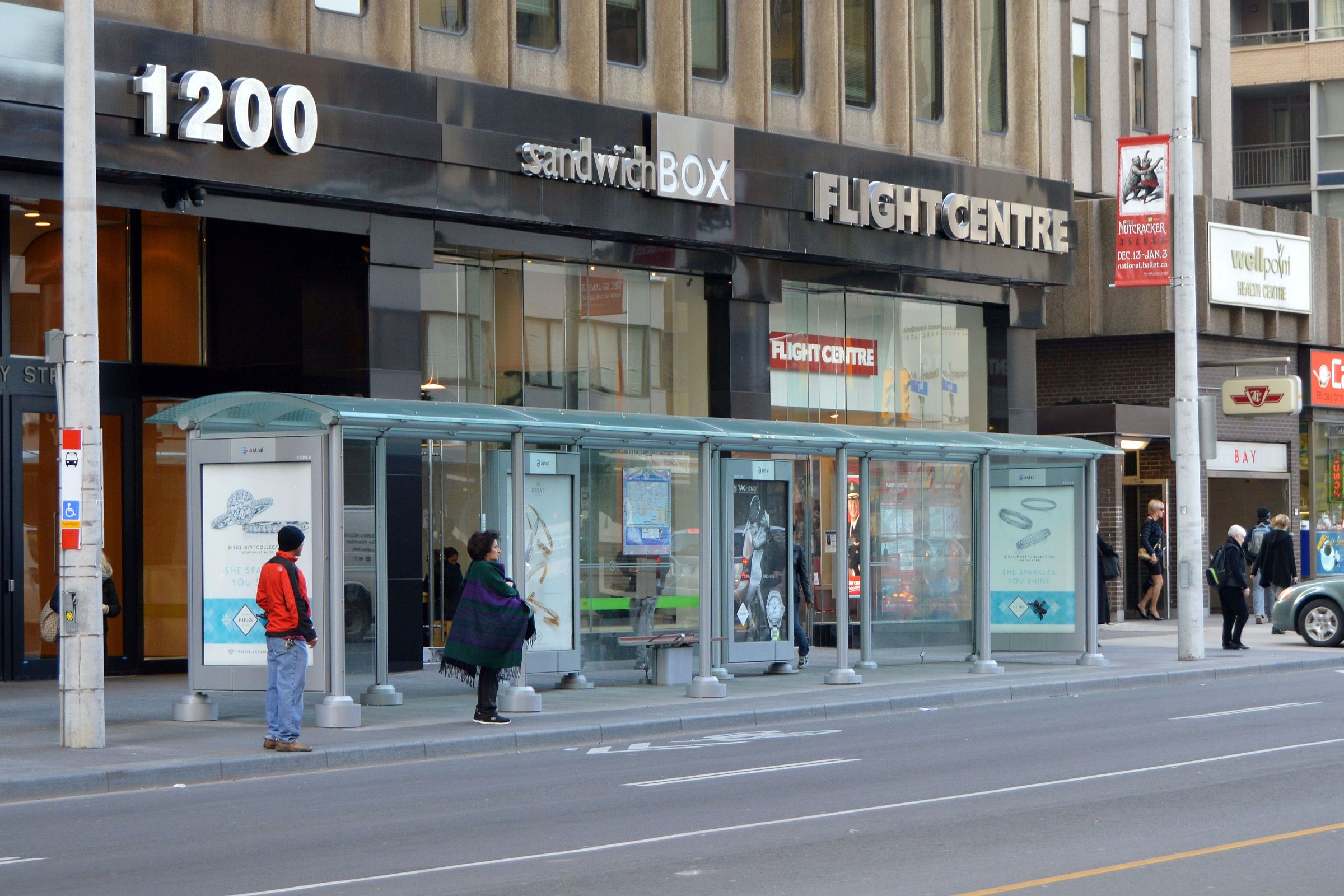
Extra-long shelter at the stop for southbound buses on Bay Street

Transfers to buses occur at curbside stops on Bay Street outside the station.

TTC routes serving the station include:

Route	Name	Additional information
19	Bay	Southbound to Queens Quay & Lower Sherbourne and northbound to Dupont Street
