= Jonathan Desbiens =

Canadian filmmaker

Jonathan Desbiens, or more commonly Jodeb, is a Juno Award-nominated Canadian filmmaker from Shawinigan-Sud, Quebec, known for his music video work for artists such as Skrillex, Imagine Dragons, Zedd, London Grammar, Porter Robinson, Halsey, ASAP Rocky, Cypress Hill and Swedish House Mafia. He graduated from Université du Québec à Trois-Rivières with a fine arts degree. He joined the production company Prettybird in 2016.

== Filmography ==
=== Director ===
==== Music videos ====
- The New Cities "Dead End Countdown" (2009)
- Deftones "You've Seen the Butcher" (2010)
- Underoath "Paperlung" (2011)
- Cypress Hill & Rusko "Roll it, Light it" (2012)
- Porter Robinson "Language" (2012)
- Zedd "Clarity" (2013)
- Anberlin "Unstable" (2013)
- Swedish House Mafia "Reload" (2014)
- Porter Robinson "Lionhearted" (2014)
- Tinashe & ASAP Rocky "Pretend" (2014)
- Imagine Dragons "I Bet My Life" (2014)
- Halsey "New Americana" (2015)
- Zedd "Beautiful Now" (2015)
- Point Point "Life in Grey" (2016)
- Skrillex and Wiwek "Killa" (2016)
- London Grammar "Non Believer" (2017)
- Jack White "Corporation" (2018)

==== Short films ====
- Still in the Cage (2016)
- Learn: 1st World Problems (2017)

==== Commercials ====
- Adidas - Originals is Never Finished - China (2017)

== Awards and nominations ==
Skrillex and Wiwek - Killa ft. Elliphant (Still In The Cage)

- Berlin Music Video Awards 2016; Won for "Best Editor"
- Juno awards 2017; Nomination for "Video of the year"

Imagine Dragons - I bet my life

- Camerimage 2015; Nomination for "Best Music Video"

Zedd - Clarity

- MTV Video Music Awards 2013; Nomination for "Artist to Watch"

The New cities - Dead End, Countdown

- Much music awards 2009; Nomination for "Post-Production of the Year"

Deftones - You've Seen the Butcher

- Antville Music Video Awards 2010; Nomination for "Best performance video"

== Interviews ==
- 1.4: True original (November 22, 2016)
- The Videostatic Interview: Jodeb (by Steven Gottlieb on June 26, 2013)
- Video Chats: Jodeb on "Reload" by Sebastian Ingrosso, Tommy Trash & John Martin (by Doug Klinger on June 18, 2013)
- Director Interview: Jonathan Desbiens (by Fantastic Music Videos)
- Jodeb: Double Exposure (by Pola Beronilla on July 24, 2015)
- Jodeb Talks Point Point - Life in Grey (by Luke Bather on February 10, 2016)
- Point Point and Director Jodeb discuss perilous short film for "Life in Grey" (Nest HQ, 2016)
