= Operator (A Girl Like Me) =

Single by Shiloh

from the album Picture Imperfect
- Released: September 23, 2008
- Recorded: 2008
- Genre: Pop-punk; ska punk
- Length: 2:56
- Label: Universal Republic
- Songwriters: Mike James; Troy Samson
- Producers: Mike James; Troy Samson

Shiloh singles chronology
"Operator (A Girl Like Me)" (2008)	"Goodbye, You Suck" (2009)

Music video
- "Operator (A Girl Like Me)" on YouTube

"Operator (A Girl Like Me)" is a song by Canadian pop rock singer Shiloh. It was released on September 23, 2008 as the debut single off her debut album Picture Imperfect (2009). The song is about staying true to oneself and not becoming superficial.

"Operator (A Girl Like Me)" peaked at number 30 on the Canadian Hot 100, making this her only top 40 hit on that chart. A music video by Aaron A was made for the single and features a split screen that shows both Shiloh and another girl as they walk down in the same direction. A live version of the song performed at the 2009 MuchMusic Video Awards was released on iTunes on June 22, 2009. The song was certified Platinum by Music Canada, denoting sales of over 80,000 units in that country.

== Critical reception ==
Jason Birchmeier of AllMusic praised the song as being a highlight amongst the album's singles, considering it to be the "most impressive, skipping along to a ska rhythm during the verse before bursting into the chorus."

== Commercial performance ==
"Operator (A Girl Like Me)" debuted at number 82 on the Canadian Hot 100 and peaked at number 30 where it stayed for a week, remaining on the chart for twenty weeks.

On September 23, 2009, the song was certified Platinum by Music Canada for selling over 80,000 copies in Canada.

== Music video ==
Directed by Aaron A, the video starts off with scenes of the promotional cover for the song. Then it shows a split screen of Shiloh in the left and a girl in the right wearing a yellow dress with a dog in her handbag, talking on her cell phone. They're both walking down a street, Shiloh has two other dancers behind her. The other girl has many unfortunate things happen to her–her cell phone's stolen; she spills her drink all over herself; her dog escapes from her handbag; she gets her sunglasses caught in her hair; and she gets dirty water thrown on her. The split screens switch simultaneously throughout the video; sometimes Shiloh will be on the right and the other girl is on the left. In the final minute of the video Shiloh has more people walking down the street behind her, dancing along to the music. It ends with Shiloh showing her knuckles to the camera with letters spelling "Operator" written on them. The video was shot on Augusta Avenue, located in Kensington Market, Toronto, Ontario, Canada.

It was nominated for a MuchMusic Video Award for Best Pop Video but lost to "Private Dancer" by Danny Fernandes.

== Live performance ==
Shiloh made her television debut performing "Operator (A Girl Like Me)" at the 2009 MuchMusic Video Awards on June 21, 2009. A day after the performance, it was released on iTunes.

== Credits and personnel ==
Credits adapted from the liner notes of Picture Imperfect.

Recording

- Hipjoint Studios: production

Personnel

- Phil Lehmann: drum programming, engineer
- Darren Parris: bass
- Troy Samson: programming
- Marc Wild: guitar

== Charts ==
Chart performance for "Operator (A Girl Like Me)"
Chart (2008–09)	Peak position
Canada Hot 100 (Billboard)	30

== Certifications ==
Certifications for "Operator (A Girl Like Me)"
Region	Certification	Certified units/sales
Canada (Music Canada)	Platinum	40,000^{*}
^{*} Sales figures based on certification alone.

== Release history ==
Release dates and formats for "Operator (A Girl Like Me)"
Region	Date	Format	Label(s)	Ref.
United States	June 1, 2009	Mainstream airplay	Universal Republic	
