= Onision =

American YouTuber (born 1985)

- Born: Gregory James Daniel; November 11, 1985 (age 41); Auburn, Washington, U.S.
- Other names: Gregory James Jackson; Gregory James Avaroe; Gregory James Daniel; James Jackson
- Occupations: YouTuber; musician; author
- Spouses: Skye Tantaga (m. 2005; div. 2010); Kai Avaroe (m. 2012)
- Partner: Shiloh Hoganson (2011)

YouTube information
- Channel: Onision
- Years active: 2006–present
- Genres: Comedy; commentary
- Subscribers: 1.96 million
- Views: 291.8 million
- Military career
- Allegiance: United States
- Branch: United States Air Force
- Service years: 2005–2008
- Last updated: August 16, 2026

James Jackson (born Gregory James Daniel; November 11, 1985), known professionally by his online alias Onision (/oʊˈnisiɒn/ oh-NEE-see-on), is an American YouTuber. His primary YouTube channel, "Onision", featured sketches and satirical clips; videos posted to his other channels focus on personal stories covering controversial topics as well as discussion with his viewers. As of July 2025, Jackson's main channel has received just under 2 million subscribers and over 290 million video views. A music video titled "Banana Song (I'm a Banana)", written and performed by Jackson, is his most-viewed video; as of November 2025, it had garnered over 96 million views.

His activity both online and offline has attracted controversy and criticism from online media outlets and viewers alike, leading to event and platform bans, as well as the demonetization of his content on YouTube. Jackson has also been the subject of various allegations of abuse, sexual grooming of minors, and rape.

== Early life ==
Jackson was born Gregory James Daniel on November 11, 1985, in Auburn, Washington. Jackson has stated in videos that his mother raised him and his older sisters in a rural environment and that they were Seventh-day Adventists. In a 2014 self-published video titled "Facts About Onision (Story Time)", Jackson stated that his mother "filed for divorce once it was made clear that his father was a child predator". During his teenage years, Jackson composed music and worked on web and graphic design. Jackson served in the United States Air Force in 2005, and received a general discharge under honorable conditions in 2008.

== Online career ==
=== YouTube content ===
Jackson created his first YouTube channel on January 29, 2006 and started uploading content that same year. His earliest clips featured a character named Chibi, whom fans interpreted as a parody of Fred Figglehorn. In 2009, Jackson uploaded "Banana Song (I'm a Banana)", which went viral. The video featured Jackson "jumping around screaming in a banana suit", as well as his first wife, Skye Tantaga. "Banana Song" was featured on the Comedy Central series Tosh.0 as the "Viewer Video of the Week" in 2010. Jackson also maintained a secondary channel named "OnisionSpeaks".

In 2011, Jackson posted a number of clips with his then-girlfriend, Canadian singer Shiloh Hoganson. In some of them, however, Hoganson is seen apparently experiencing transient amnesia; Adrienne Jourgensen, an ex-girlfriend of Jackson's, published a letter stating that Jackson believed Hoganson was lying about her memory loss. Jackson and Hoganson later stated that she was pregnant with Jackson's child but suffered a miscarriage. On August 11, 2019, a 2011 video featuring Hoganson resurfaced online. In it, Jackson is heard telling her, "You know this video is never going to be online, right? No one will ever know how much I abuse you", before throwing candy corn at her and laughing as she cried. Hoganson also states in the video that Jackson lacerated her ear with scissors while she was sleeping.

In 2019, Insider wrote that Jackson was "best known for his objectifying content and controversial reputation", and detailed that "he rates pictures that women submit to him, gives his opinions on their bodies, and comments on other YouTubers". Many of the submissions that Jackson accepted and featured in his videos were of girls under the age of eighteen. Jackson was also noted by Business Insider to make jokes about eating disorders in his videos.

=== Reception and criticism ===
Jackson's on-camera and off-camera activity has received criticism from online media outlets as well as from fellow online content creators. In 2010, Tubefilter listed Jackson as one of "5 YouTubers On Their Way Up", alongside Shane Dawson and the Fine Brothers. The outlet described Jackson's channel as frequently updated with a "very rough, in-your-face R-rated style" and called Jackson "the most controversial YouTuber". In 2012, The Daily Dot described Jackson as "known for his militant vegetarianism, sex appeal, comedic skits, and controversial views on topics like circumcision." The publication has also criticized his content on multiple occasions; in 2013, James Cook wrote for the outlet, calling Jackson "YouTube's most troubled star".

In 2018, Jackson was included on a Daily Dot-published list of six YouTubers "worse" than Logan Paul. The outlet opined that "[Jackson's] videos these days [2018] are just as obnoxious and irritating as they were nine years ago when he first struck YouTube gold with a truly terrible song about being a banana." Jackson has also received criticism from fellow YouTubers, notably Daniel Sulzbach (known online as "MrRepzion" or "Repzion"), Strange Æons, and Blaire White. In a 2019 email to Insider, Jackson shared that "People hated me, with a passion, for my opinions I openly held." In late 2019, Insider called Jackson "one of YouTube's most reviled personalities".

== Controversies and legal issues ==
=== Event and platform bans ===
Jackson was banned from VidCon 2012 due to a video in which he stated that since his then girlfriend Adrienne Jourgensen slept with more than 20 people before she was with him, she is a "slut" and therefore "cannot be raped". The video then received backlash from viewers outside of Jackson's core audience, as noted by NewMediaRockstars and The Daily Dot. VidCon co-founder Hank Green sent an email to Jackson stating "if it is possible that you will not be safe, we will not let you come [to VidCon]."

In November 2019, Jackson was banned from Patreon after posting the phone number of Billie Dawn Webb, a fellow YouTuber. Webb was one of several women who claimed Jackson and his spouse had groomed and manipulated them into a sexual relationship or otherwise engaged in harassment and abuse. Patreon confirmed in a statement to The Verge that they had banned Jackson "as he violated our Bullying and Harassment [policy] as it relates to doxing." In response to the ban, Jackson uploaded a video where he seemingly contorted himself, stripped down to his underwear, and poured a bottle of kombucha over his head. Jackson later said that this video, alongside a series of follow-up videos, were staged. Jackson subsequently opened a new website where his supporters could re-donate, but shut it down shortly after its launch. After being de-platformed by Patreon, Jackson launched an OnlyFans account.

In January 2021, following the release of Onision: In Real Life, Jackson's channels were suspended from the YouTube Partner Program.

=== Allegations of abuse, child grooming, and rape ===
In 2019, allegations of child grooming and abuse were levelled at Jackson and his spouse, Kai Avaroe, formerly known as Lainey. Jackson responded by stating that "the grooming stuff is absolute nonsense". As mentioned before, Webb was one of several women who alleged Jackson and Avaroe abused her; Webb stated that she and other women were sent texts asking them to "be chained to [the] basement wall for a week with a sign around [their] neck that says 'I'm sorry for lying.'" When reached by Insider for a comment in response to these allegations, Jackson requested $10,000 for an interview and stated: "I do not want to participate in this circus without compensation, I should be paid to endure to [sic] stupidity of the current state of outrage/online culture."

In January 2020, Jackson called 911 on American television journalist Chris Hansen and lawyer Mike Morse in response to them knocking on his door. Jackson described Hansen and his crew as "YouTube stalkers". At the time, Hansen was collecting stories from Jackson's alleged victims and uploading interviews with them to YouTube; Hansen stated that when knocking on Jackson's door, he was aiming to get Jackson's "side of the story" about the allegations of predatory grooming against him. Hansen later served as a producer and consultant on a documentary about Jackson titled Onision: In Real Life. It was broadcast on January 4, 2021, during the launch of Discovery+.

In February 2023, a woman filed a lawsuit against Jackson and Avaroe, alleging that "minor females" were "invited to the couple's home with the intent to engage in sexual acts and three-way sexual encounters with the couple, or for additional grooming." On March 3, an ex-partner named Sarah levied a second suit against Jackson and Avaroe which alleges they groomed her when she was 14 and that Jackson raped her when she was 18.

== Discography ==
- Onision (2012)
- Explicit (2012)
- Bipolar (2012)
- Flucking Blitch (2013)
- The Puppet (2018)
- Shut Up (2018)
- With Character (2018)
- The Banana Man (2019)
- I'm a Meme (2019)
- I Am Trash (2020)

== Bibliography ==
=== Novels ===
- Stones to Abbigale (2015)
- This Is Why I Hate You (2015)
- Reaper's Creek (2018)

=== Biography ===
- In Real Life (2023)
