= Tonight, I Love You =

Single by The Latency

from the album The Latency
- Released: December 2008
- Length: 3:44
- Label: MapleMusic Recordings
- Songwriters: Brandon Lehti; Ryan Stead; Mathew Gendron; Jonny Wiebe; Jacob Hoggard; Tommy Mac
- Producer: Mac

The Latency singles chronology
"Tonight, I Love You" (2008)	"Kids" (2009)

Music video
- "Tonight, I Love You" on YouTube

"Tonight, I Love You" is a song by Canadian pop rock band The Latency. It was released in December 2008 as the lead single from their debut self-titled studio album. The song peaked at number 93 on the Canadian Hot 100.

== Background ==
In 2008, The Latency released their debut single, "Tonight, I Love You". Without any label support, the single received nation-wide radio airplay, charting on the Canada Hot AC chart. The success of the song garnered the attention of labels, leading to the group signing with Maple Music Recordings. The song appeared on the band's debut EP, Chomp!!, before it was released as the lead single from their debut self-titled studio album.

"Tonight, I Love You" was written by Brandon Lehti, Ryan Stead, Mathew Gendron and Jonny Wiebe. It was also co-written by Hedley's Jacob Hoggard and Tommy Mac. The song was also featured on the Canadian teen drama television show, Degrassi.

The single was nominated for Hot Adult Contemporary Song of the Year at the 2010 Canadian Radio Music Awards, but lost to Karl Wolf's "Africa".

== Accolades ==
In 2010, "Tonight I Love You" was nominated for a Canadian Radio Music Award in the Hot Adult Contemporary category.

== Music video ==
The music video for "Tonight, I Love You" was shot in Whistler, British Columbia in February 2009, and was directed by Colin Minihan. The video premiered on MuchMusic on April 2, 2009. The video reached number one on the MuchMusic Countdown.

== Personnel ==
Credits for "Tonight, I Love You" adapted from album's liner notes.

The Latency

- Brandon Lehti – lead vocals, rhythm guitar
- Ryan Stead – lead guitar, backing vocals
- Mathew Gendron – bass guitar, backing vocals
- Jonny Wiebe – drums

Production

- Dean Maher – engineering, mixing
- Joao Carvalho – mastering
- Tommy Mac – producer

== Charts ==
Chart performance for "Tonight, I Love You"
Chart (2009)	Peak position
Canada (Canadian Hot 100)	93
Canada Hot AC (Billboard)	28

== Release history ==
Release history and formats for "Tonight, I Love You"
Region	Date	Format	Label	Ref.
Canada	December 2008	Contemporary hit radio	MapleMusic Recordings	
