= 2009 MuchMusic Video Awards =

- 2009 MuchMusic Video Awards Logo
- Date: June 21, 2009
- Location: 299 Queen Street West
- Country: Canada
- Hosted by: Jonas Brothers (co-host)
- Website: MMVA 2009 (archived)

Television/radio coverage
- Network: MuchMusic
- Runtime: 120 minutes

The 2009 MuchMusic Video Awards were held in Toronto, Ontario at MuchMusic's headquarters on June 21, 2009. Along with the MuchMusic VJ's, on April 16, 2009, it was confirmed on the MuchMusic website that the Jonas Brothers would co-host the show. The show featured performances by The Black Eyed Peas, Billy Talent, Lady Gaga, Jonas Brothers, Alexisonfire, Kelly Clarkson and others. The artists with the most nominations were Nickelback and Danny Fernandes with five nominations each. Nickelback won the most awards with 3 awards.

== Winners and nominees ==
Nominees for the People's Choice awards had been announced. Four nominations had already been chosen by MuchMusic and one wild card nomination will be chosen which has the most votes on the MuchMusic website. The nominees were, with the winners in bold:

=== Best Video ===
- **Nickelback — "Gotta Be Somebody"**
- Danny Fernandes — "Private Dancer"
- k-os — "4, 3, 2, 1 "
- Marianas Trench — "Cross My Heart"
- The Stills — "Being Here"

=== Best Post Production ===
- **Nickelback — "Gotta Be Somebody"**
- Classified — "Anybody Listening"
- Mobile — "The Killer"
- The New Cities — "Dead End Countdown"
- The Stills — "Being Here"

=== Best Cinematography ===
- **Bedouin Soundclash — "Until We Burn In the Sun (The Kids Just Want a Love Song)"**
- Elise Estrada — "Crash and Burn"
- k-os — "4, 3, 2, 1"
- The Midway State — "Change for You"
- Theory of a Deadman — "All or Nothing"

=== Best Director ===
- **Marianas Trench — "Cross My Heart" (directed by: Colin Minihan)**
- Bedouin Soundclash — "Until We Burn In the Sun (The Kids Just Want a Love Song)" (directed by: Michael Maxxis)
- Classified — "Anybody Listening" (directed by: Harv)
- Danny Fernandes — "Private Dancer" (directed by: RT!)
- Theory of a Deadman — "All or Nothing" (directed by: Davin Black)

=== Best Pop Video ===
- **Danny Fernandes — "Private Dancer"**
- Elise Estrada — "Crash And Burn"
- Karl Wolf — "Africa"
- Lights — "Drive My Soul"
- Shiloh — "Operator (A Girl Like Me)"

=== MuchLOUD Best Rock Video ===
- **Nickelback — "Gotta Be Somebody"**
- Inward Eye — "Shame"
- Marianas Trench — "Cross My Heart"
- Ten Second Epic — "Life Times"
- Theory of a Deadman — "All or Nothing"

=== MuchVIBE Best Hip Hop Video ===
- **Classified — "Anybody Listening"**
- Famous — "Ain't No Use"
- JB feat. Ghetto Flex — "Move Your Body"
- k-os — "4, 3, 2, 1"
- Shad — "The Old Prince Still Lives at Home"

=== VideoFACT Best Independent Video ===
- **The Midway State — "Never Again"**
- Bedouin Soundclash — "Until We Burn In the Sun (The Kids Just Want a Love Song)"
- Metric — "Gimme Sympathy"
- Sebastien Grainger and the Mountains — "Who Do We Care For?"
- Shad — "The Old Prince Still Lives at Home"

=== Best International Video – Artist ===
- **Lady Gaga — "Poker Face"**
- Beyoncé — "Single Ladies (Put a Ring on It)"
- Britney Spears — "Womanizer"
- Kanye West — "Heartless"
- Katy Perry — "Hot n Cold"
- Kevin Rudolf feat. "Lil Wayne — "Let It Rock"
- Kelly Clarkson — "My Life Would Suck Without You"
- Lil Wayne — "A Milli"
- Miley Cyrus — "The Climb"
- T.I. feat. Rihanna — "Live Your Life"

=== Best International Video – Group ===
- **The Black Eyed Peas — "Boom Boom Pow"**
- Coldplay — "Viva la Vida"
- Green Day — "Know Your Enemy"
- Jonas Brothers — "Lovebug"
- Kings of Leon — "Sex on Fire"
- Metro Station — "Shake It"
- MGMT — "Electric Feel"
- Pussycat Dolls — "I Hate This Part"
- Rise Against — "Re-Education (Through Labor)"
- The Killers — "Human"

=== Best International Video by a Canadian ===
- **Billy Talent — "Rusted from the Rain"**
- K'naan feat. Chubb Rock — "ABC's"
- Kardinall Offishall feat. Akon — "Dangerous"
- Kreesha Turner — "Don't Call Me Baby"
- Nickelback — "If Today Was Your Last Day"

=== MuchMusic.com Most Watched Video ===
1. **Girlicious — "Like Me"**
2. Girlicious — "Stupid Shit"
3. Kevin Rudolf feat. Lil' Wayne — "Let It Rock"
4. Lady Gaga — "Poker Face"
5. Pussycat Dolls — "When I Grow Up"

=== UR Fave: New Artist ===
- **The Midway State — "Never Again"**
- Danny Fernandes — "Fantasy"
- Lights — "Drive My Soul"
- Shiloh — "Goodbye, You Suck"
- Wildcard: Karl Wolf — "Africa"

=== UR Fave: Canadian Video ===
- **Wildcard: Simple Plan — "Save You"**
- Danny Fernandes — "Fantasy"
- Kardinal Offishall feat. Akon — "Dangerous"
- Marianas Trench — "Cross My Heart"
- Nickelback — "Gotta Be Somebody"

=== UR Fave: International Video ===
- **Jonas Brothers — "Burnin' Up"**
- Katy Perry — "I Kissed a Girl"
- Lady Gaga — "Poker Face"
- Lil Wayne — "A Milli"
- Wildcard: Britney Spears — "Womanizer"

== Performers ==
- Jonas Brothers – Burnin' Up (Parking Lot Stage)
- Alexisonfire – Young Cardinals (John St. Stage)
- The Black Eyed Peas – Boom Boom Pow (Parking Lot Stage)
- Shiloh – Operator (A Girl Like Me) (John St. Stage)
- Billy Talent – Rusted from the Rain (rooftop of the former MuchStore, above the parking lot)
- Kelly Clarkson – My Life Would Suck Without You (Parking Lot Stage)
- Classified – Anybody Listening (John St. Stage)
- Jonas Brothers – Paranoid (Parking Lot Stage)
- Rise Against – Audience of One (John St. Stage)
- Lady Gaga – LoveGame and Poker Face medley (Parking Lot Stage)
- Nickelback – Burn It to the Ground (Parking Lot Stage)

(performances listed in chronological order.)

== Appearances ==
- Alexander Ovechkin
- Alexisonfire
- Audrina Patridge
- Billy Talent
- The Black Eyed Peas
- Brittany Flickinger
- Brody Jenner
- Chris Bosh
- Classified
- Danny Fernandes
- Divine Brown
- Drake
- Elise Estrada
- Girlicious with Robin Antin
- Jayde Nicole
- Jermaine Dupri
- Karl Wolf
- Kelly Clarkson
- Kim Kardashian
- Lights
- Marianas Trench
- The Midway State
- Natalli Reznik
- Nicholas "Nico" Archambault
- Nickelback
- Perez Hilton
- Rachelle Lefevre
- Reggie Bush
- Rise Against
- Rumer Willis
- Shiloh
- Stereos
- Taylor Lautner
- Theory of a Deadman
- Tila Tequila

== Post-show altercations ==
During a post-show after-party hosted by will.i.am of the Black Eyed Peas at a local nightclub, Perez Hilton was allegedly assaulted by the group's tour manager Liborio Molina. Hilton reported in a video on his blog that he was 'clubbed' in the eye by the said manager. will.i.am also later tweeted, defending the group's position in this matter. According to will.i.am, Perez was being provocative in his blog regarding Black Eyed Peas' member Fergie, as well as their latest album release, The E.N.D. An altercation ensued between Hilton and will.i.am, at which point Molina approached Hilton from behind and 'clubbed' him in the right eye, leaving a visible bump as seen in the video he posted during the following morning. Molina was arrested following the incident and appeared in a court hearing in Toronto on August 5, 2009.
