= Lost in City Lights =

Studio album by The New Cities
- Released: April 30, 2009
- Genre: Rock; electronic rock
- Length: 45:27
- Label: Sony Music Canada
- Producer: Greig Nori; Alex McMahon

The New Cities chronology
The New Cities EP (2006)	Lost in City Lights (2009)	Kill the Lights (2011)

Singles from Lost in City Lights
- 1. "Dead End Countdown" Released: February 24, 2009; 2. "Leaders of the Misled" Released: August 11, 2009; 3. "Hypertronic Superstar" Released: March 23, 2010

Lost in City Lights is the debut studio album by pop rock band The New Cities. It was released on April 30, 2009, via Sony Music Canada. Produced by Greig Nori and Alex McMahon, the album peaked at number 48 on the Canadian Albums Chart. The album spawned three singles, "Dead End Countdown", "Leaders of the Misled" and "Hypertronic Superstar".

It was nominated for an ADISQ Award for Album Anglophone de l'année. In support of the album, the band toured with Ten Second Epic and Faber Drive in Canada, as well as performing shows in Europe.

== Background and recording ==
After independently releasing their self-titled EP in 2006, the band met producer Greig Nori and began writing new material with him. As a result, the band co-wrote "Dead End Countdown", which was described as "representative of the album." According to singer David Brown, the band avoided being "too dance, nor too rock" on the album compared to their EP, while maintaining to keep a bit of that sound.

The group also signed with Sony Music Canada.

== Release and promotion ==
The album's first single "Dead End Countdown" was released on February 24, 2009. The song peaked at number 16 on the Canadian Hot 100 and was certified Gold by Music Canada. On May 5, the album was released. The album's second single "Leaders of the Misled" was released on August 11. The song reached number 99 on the Canadian Hot 100. That same month, the band performed at 1,000 Islands Music Festival, joining Simple Plan, ILL Scarlett, Plain White T's, the Arkells and Lights, among many more at the event. In the fall of 2009, the band toured in Canada, with support from Ten Second Epic. They also toured in Europe, with shows in the United Kingdom in early 2010.

On March 23, 2010, the album's third single "Hypertronic Superstar" was released. The song peaked at number 58 on the Canadian Hot 100. In April, the band opened for Faber Drive on the Can't Keep a Secret tour alongside These Kids Wear Crowns, Jesse Labelle and The Latency. In June and July, the group supported Emily Osment on the MuchMusic SodaPOP music festival.

== Awards and nominations ==
Awards and nominations for Lost in City Lights
Year	Organization	Award	Result	Ref(s)
2010	ADISQ Awards	Album Anglophone de l'année	Nominated	

== Track listing ==
Standard edition
No.	Title	Length
1.	"Hypertronic Superstar"	2:53
2.	"Dead End Countdown"	3:14
3.	"Take It Back/Cheat Again"	3:12
4.	"Looks Minus Substance"	3:10
5.	"Leaders of the Misled"	2:55
6.	"Lost in City Lights"	3:29
7.	"Far Beyond"	3:25
8.	"X-Revolution (Settling For Second Best)"	3:20
9.	"Low Radiation"	3:30
10.	"Modern Ghosts"	2:46
11.	"Sinking Has Never Been So Easy"	3:56
Total length:		45:27

iTunes bonus track
No.	Title	Length
11.	"Low Radiation" (alternate version)

== Personnel ==
Credits adapted from the album's liner notes.

The New Cities

- David Brown – lead vocals
- Julien Martre – backing vocals, bassist
- Christian Bergeron – guitarist
- Francis Fugere – drums
- Nicolas Denis – synth
- Philippe Lachance – synth

Production

- Greig Nori – producer
- Alex McMahon – producer, recording
- Dave Ogilvie – mixing
- Phil Demetro – mastering
- Olivier Jean – recording
- Ryan Haslett – engineer

== Charts ==
Chart performance for Lost in City Lights
Chart (2009)	Peak position
Canadian Albums (Nielsen SoundScan)	48

== Release history ==
Release history and formats for Lost in City Lights
Region	Date	Edition	Format	Label	Ref.
Various	April 30, 2009	iTunes bonus track	Digital download	Sony Music Canada	
Canada	May 5, 2009	Standard	CD	Sony Music Canada	
