= Dead End Countdown =

Single by The New Cities

from the album Lost in City Lights
- Released: February 24, 2009
- Genre: Electropop
- Length: 3:17
- Label: Sony Music Canada
- Songwriters: Christian Bergeron; Matthew Brann; David Brown; Nicolas Denis; Francis Fugere; Philippe Lachance; Julien Martre; Greig Nori
- Producers: Greig Nori; Alex McMahon

The New Cities singles chronology
"Dead End Countdown" (2009)	"Leaders Of The Misled" (2009)

"Dead End Countdown" is the debut single by Canadian band The New Cities from their debut studio album, Lost in City Lights. The song peaked at number 16 on the Canadian Hot 100 and was certified Gold by Music Canada with over 20,000 digital downloads.

The song won the SOCAN "Pop/Rock Music Award" and the music video, directed by Jodeb, was nominated at the 2009 MuchMusic Video Awards for "Post-Production of the Year".

== Background and composition ==
"Dead End Countdown" was written by Christian Bergeron, Matthew Brann, David Brown, Nicolas Denis, Francis Fugere, Philippe Lachance, Julien Martre and Greig Nori. It was produced by Nori and Alex McMahon. The song is about "the melancholy that surrounds a break-up." Musically, the song is described as electropop, which singer David Brown said of the track, "We really identify with this song, with its New Order-esque foundation. It's rock and soft at the same time. It represents us well."

== Release ==
The song was released for digital download in Canada, on February 24, 2009. In the United States, it was released on June 16, this version titled, "Dead End Countdown (New Mix)". In the United Kingdom, it was released on April 26, 2010, which features an alternative version, a remix by Dave Ogilvie and a music video of the song.

== Awards and nominations ==
Awards and nominations for "Dead End Countdown"
Year	Organization	Award	Result	Ref(s)
2009	MuchMusic Video Awards	Post Production of the Year	Nominated	
2010	SOCAN Awards	Pop/Rock Music Award	Won	

== Music video ==
The music video for "Dead End Countdown" was released on April 17, 2009, and was directed by Jodeb. The video reached number seven on the MuchMusic Countdown. It was nominated for Post-Production of the Year at the 2009 MuchMusic Video Awards. The video was released in the UK and Ireland in March 2010, and was added to Kerrang! TV, Scuzz TV, NME TV, Chart Show TV and The Box playlists. The video reached number ten on the Kerrang! TV's "Most Wanted".

== Track listing ==
Digital download
No.	Title	Length
1.	"Dead End Countdown"	3:17

Digital download – US release
No.	Title	Length
1.	"Dead End Countdown" (new mix)	4:04

Digital download – EP
No.	Title	Length
1.	"Dead End Countdown"	3:14
2.	"Dead End Countdown" (alternative version)	3:20
3.	"Dead End Countdown" (Dave 'Rave' Ogilvie remix)	3:53
4.	"Dead End Countdown" (music video)	3:14

== Personnel ==
Credits for "Dead End Countdown" adapted from the album's liner notes.

The New Cities

- David Brown – lead vocals
- Julien Martre – backing vocals, bassist
- Christian Bergeron – guitarist
- Francis Fugere – drums
- Nicolas Denis – synth
- Philippe Lachance – synth

Production

- Greig Nori – producer
- Alex McMahon – producer, recording
- Dave Ogilvie – mixing
- Phil Demetro – mastering
- Olivier Jean – recording
- Ryan Haslett – engineer

== Charts ==
=== Weekly charts ===
Weekly chart performance for "Dead End Countdown"
Chart (2009)	Peak position
Canada Hot 100 (Billboard)	16
Canada CHR/Top 40 (Billboard)	8
Canada Hot AC (Billboard)	10

=== Year-end charts ===
Year-end chart performance for "Dead End Countdown"
Chart (2009)	Position
Canada Hot 100 (Billboard)	69

== Certifications ==
Certifications for "Dead End Countdown"
Region	Certification	Certified units/sales
Canada (Music Canada)	Gold	20,000^{*}
^{*} Sales figures based on certification alone.

== Release history ==
Release dates and formats for "Dead End Countdown"
Region	Date	Format	Label	Ref.
Canada	February 24, 2009	Digital download	Sony Music Canada	
United States	June 16, 2009	Digital download	Sony Music	
United Kingdom	April 26, 2010	Digital download	Red Ink	
