= Picture Imperfect =

Studio album by Shiloh
- Released: August 18, 2009
- Genre: Pop-punk; pop rock
- Length: 45:58
- Label: Universal Music Canada
- Producer: Troy Samson; Mike James; Rob Wells; Justin Forsley

Shiloh chronology
Picture Imperfect (2009)	1993 (2019)

Singles from Picture Imperfect
- 1. "Operator (A Girl Like Me)" Released: September 23, 2008; 2. "Goodbye, You Suck" Released: March 10, 2009; 3. "Alright" Released: June 17, 2009; 4. "I Remember" Released: September 2009

Picture Imperfect is the debut album by Canadian singer and songwriter Shiloh released on Universal Music Canada. It was released on August 18, 2009, in Canada. Picture Imperfect debuted and peaked at number nine on the Canadian Albums Chart.

== Singles ==
"Operator (A Girl Like Me)" debuted on Family Channel during their "Stand Up Against Bullying" week in late 2008, it has since been played many times on Family Channel, on FamJam. It has been viewed over 2 million times on Shiloh's official YouTube channel.

"Goodbye, You Suck" is the second single for the album. The music video was released in early 2009 and has made it to the top 5 on the MuchMusic Countdown.

The third single, "Alright", made its YouTube debut on June 17, 2009.

Shiloh was a special guest performer in one of YTV's The Next Star episodes.

== Critical reception ==
Professional ratings
Review scores
Source	Rating
AllMusic	3.5/5 stars

AllMusic's Jason Birchmeier praised the various genre styles heard throughout the album and being reminiscent of an up-and-coming Pink, concluding that "At only 16 years of age, Shiloh has plenty of time to develop not only her songwriting but also her persona, and it will be interesting to see what comes of her in the future, for she definitely has the makings of a punk-pop superstar. In any event, she's off to a promising start with Picture Imperfect, a likable album with lots of hit material."

== Track listing ==
Picture Imperfect track listing
No.	Title	Writer(s)	Producer(s)	Length
1.	"Operator (A Girl Like Me)"	Troy Samson; Mike James	Samson; James	2:54
2.	"Alright"	Samson; James	Samson; James	3:41
3.	"You're Not Alone"	Shiloh; Samson; James; Rupert Gayle	Samson; James	4:13
4.	"Goodbye, You Suck"	Shiloh; Rob Wells	Wells	3:24
5.	"I Remember"	Shiloh; Mladen; Rebecca Everett	Justin Forsley	3:31
6.	"Better"	Shiloh; Gayle; JC Smith	Wells	3:21
7.	"Strong Enough to Cry"	Shiloh; Forsley; Gayle	Forsley	3:35
8.	"Get to You"	Shiloh; Forsley; Gayle	Forsley	3:37
9.	"Missing Existence"	Shiloh; Wells; Gayle	Wells	3:18
10.	"It's Not Me"	Samson; James	Samson; James	3:52
11.	"Raise a Little Hell Now"	Samson; James	Samson; James	3:38
12.	"The Fight"	Alonzo; Samson; James	Samson; James	3:39
13.	"Ruin Me"	Shiloh	Wells	3:15

iTunes/Spotify Download Only Bonus Track
No.	Title	Writer(s)	Producer(s)	Length
14.	"All I Want"	Shiloh	Wells	5:34"

2017 deluxe edition
No.	Title	Writer(s)	Producer(s)	Length
14.	"Hello Sir Heartbreak"	Shiloh	Wells	2:39
15.	"Blame It On Me"	Shiloh	Wells	2:39
16.	"Break"	Shiloh	Wells	3:37

== Personnel ==
- Mike Fraser – mixing (The Warehouse, Vancouver)
- Tom Coyne – mastering (Sterling Sound, NYC)
- Garnet Armstrong – art direction/design, Illustrations
- Simon Paul – illustrations
- Ivan Otis – photography

== Charts ==
Chart performance for Picture Imperfect
Chart (2009)	Peak position
Canadian Albums (Billboard)	9
