= The Latency =

Canadian pop rock band

- Origin: Maple Ridge, British Columbia, Canada
- Genres: Pop rock; pop punk
- Years active: 2006–2011
- Label: MapleMusic
- Past members: Brandon Lehti; Ryan Stead; Mathew Gendron; Jonny Wiebe

The Latency was a Canadian pop rock group from Maple Ridge, British Columbia. The band formed in 2006 and signed with MapleMusic Recordings, before releasing their self-titled album on September 8, 2009. In 2010, they began working on their second studio album, before the group disbanded in 2011.

The band consisted of rhythm guitarist and lead vocalist Brandon Lehti, lead guitarist Ryan Stead, bassist Mathew Gendron and drummer Jonny Wiebe.

== History ==
Vocalist Brandon Lehti, guitarist Ryan Stead and bassist Mathew Gendron were 15 when they met at a Battle of Bands contest, while attending Garibaldi Secondary School. They decided to form the band in 2006, after their separate bands broke up. Lehti started on drums before moving up as the band's vocalist while Jonny Wiebe joined as the drummer. The name, "The Latency" was thought of by the band which refers to potential energy. The group was discovered by bassist Tommy Mac of Hedley, who helped produced their debut album. According to Lehti, the band met Mac who came to their high school as a guest speaker and later became their manager as soon as the band got started. They posted their first track onto YouTube in April 2007, a song titled, "Your Time's Been Up for a While Now". On July 1, 2008, the band released their debut EP, Chomp!! and supported Hedley on their Western Canadian tour. In the spring of 2009, the band went on tour in Ontario. The group also headlined the Samapalooza festival in March 2009. They were nominated for Favourite Pop Artist/Group at the Independent Music Awards in 2009.

Without any label support, the group released their debut single, "Tonight, I Love You" in 2008. The song received nation-wide radio airplay, and peaked at number 93 on the Canadian Hot 100. The success of the song led to the band attracting the interest of several record labels. The Latency were soon signed to MapleMusic Recordings. A music video for the single was released in 2009 and reached number one on the MuchMusic Countdown. The song was also featured on the Canadian teen drama television show, Degrassi. On May 19, 2009, Chomp!! was re-released digitally onto iTunes. The second single released from their debut album, "Kids", was sent for radio airplay on May 26. In September 2009, the group released their debut studio album, The Latency and joined Simple Plan, Marianas Trench and Plain White T's on tour in support of the album. They also supported Shiloh on the Scene tour, as well as performing on MuchOnDemand in September 2009. "All You Wanted" was released as the album's third single and premiered on MuchMusic on July 24, 2009. On August 29, the group performed at the Canadian National Exhibition alongside Faber Drive, Fefe Dobson and Shiloh. The Latency was nominated for Pop Recording of the Year at the 2010 Western Canadian Music Awards. The fourth single released from their debut studio album, "Fork in the Road", was released in February 2010. "Tonight, I Love You" was nominated for Hot Adult Contemporary Song of the Year at the 2010 Canadian Radio Music Awards, but lost to Karl Wolf's "Africa". In March 2010, Lehti took part in Young Artists for Haiti to raise funds to support the victims of the 2010 earthquake performing K'naan's "Wavin' Flag". Lehti got a call from Dave Faber of Faber Drive, who invited him to join the group of Canadian artists for the occasion. There, he met then-president and CEO Randy Lennox, who signed him up to be a part of the movement.

In April 2010, the group embarked on the SASS tour, in promotion of the School Alliance of Student Songwriters program. The band later supported Faber Drive on the Can't Keep a Secret tour along with These Kids Wear Crowns, Jesse Labelle and The New Cities. During the tour, the group began working on writing songs with Faber Drive after Dave Faber offered to write songs with them. The band also confirmed in May 2010, that they were working on their second studio album and had already finished four tracks. By June 2010, the group had written eleven songs. In November 2010, the band made a guest appearance on the American comedy-drama television show, Hellcats. The album's lead single, "Music to Me" was released on June 23, 2011. The group performed at the Maple Ridge Music Fest in July 2011. On December 4, 2011, the group announced that they would be parting ways, ultimately cancelling the release of their second album. The band released the three remaining tracks intended for their second album, "Break The Ice", "Hero" and "Still Believe In You" on MySpace before splitting up.

After the band disbanded, Lehti became involved in the dance music scene and Stead became involved in the country music scene.

== Musical style ==
Their music has been described as pop rock, and pop punk. They have been compared to pop rock contemporaries Hedley, Marianas Trench and Faber Drive. The group cites influences from Rush, Celine Dion and Nickelback. Lehti and Stead who both come from broken homes, used that experience to write songs that listeners can relate to. Lehti stated that their songs were written from experiences he has been through, or seen other people go through, which "creates honesty" in their music. The band blends vocal hooks, metal riffs and strong beats to help connect them with the audience. While working on their cancelled second studio album before the band broke up, they took a different approach with their sound opting for a more organic sound, featuring more instrumentation, piano, strings and horns.

== Band members ==
=== Former ===
- Brandon Lehti – lead vocals, rhythm guitar (2006–2011); drums (2006–2007)
- Ryan Stead – lead guitar, backing vocals (2006–2011)
- Mathew Gendron – bass guitar, piano, screaming vocals (2006–2011)
- Jonny Wiebe – drums, percussion (2007–2010)

== Discography ==
=== Studio albums ===
List of studio albums with selected details
Title	Album details
The Latency	Released: September 8, 2009; Label: MapleMusic; Format: CD, digital download

=== Extended plays ===
List of extended plays with selected details
Title	EP details
Chomp!	Released: July 1, 2008; Label: MapleMusic; Format: CD, digital download

=== Singles ===
List of singles as lead artist, with selected chart positions, showing year released and album name
Title	Year	Peak chart positions		Album
Title	Year	CAN	CAN HAC	Album
"Tonight, I Love You"	2008	93	28	Chomp!!
"Kids"	2009	—	—	The Latency
"All You Wanted"	2009	—	—	The Latency
"Fork in the Road"	2010	—	—	The Latency
"Music to Me"	2011	—	—	Non-album single
"—" denotes releases that did not chart.

=== Music videos ===
Title	Year	Director(s)	Ref.
"Tonight, I Love You"	2009	Colin Minihan	
"Kids"	2009	John Poliquin	
"Fork in the Road"	2010	Colin Minihan	

== Awards and nominations ==
Year	Association	Category	Nominated work	Result	Ref.
2009	Independent Music Awards	Favourite Pop Artist/Group	The Latency	Nominated	
2010	Western Canadian Music Awards	Pop Recording of the Year	The Latency	Nominated	
2010	Canadian Radio Music Awards	Hot Adult Contemporary	"Tonight, I Love You"	Nominated	
2010	Chart Attack Readers' Poll	Sexiest Canadian Man	Ryan Stead	Nominated	
