= Lyldoll =

Canadian singer-songwriter (born 1993)

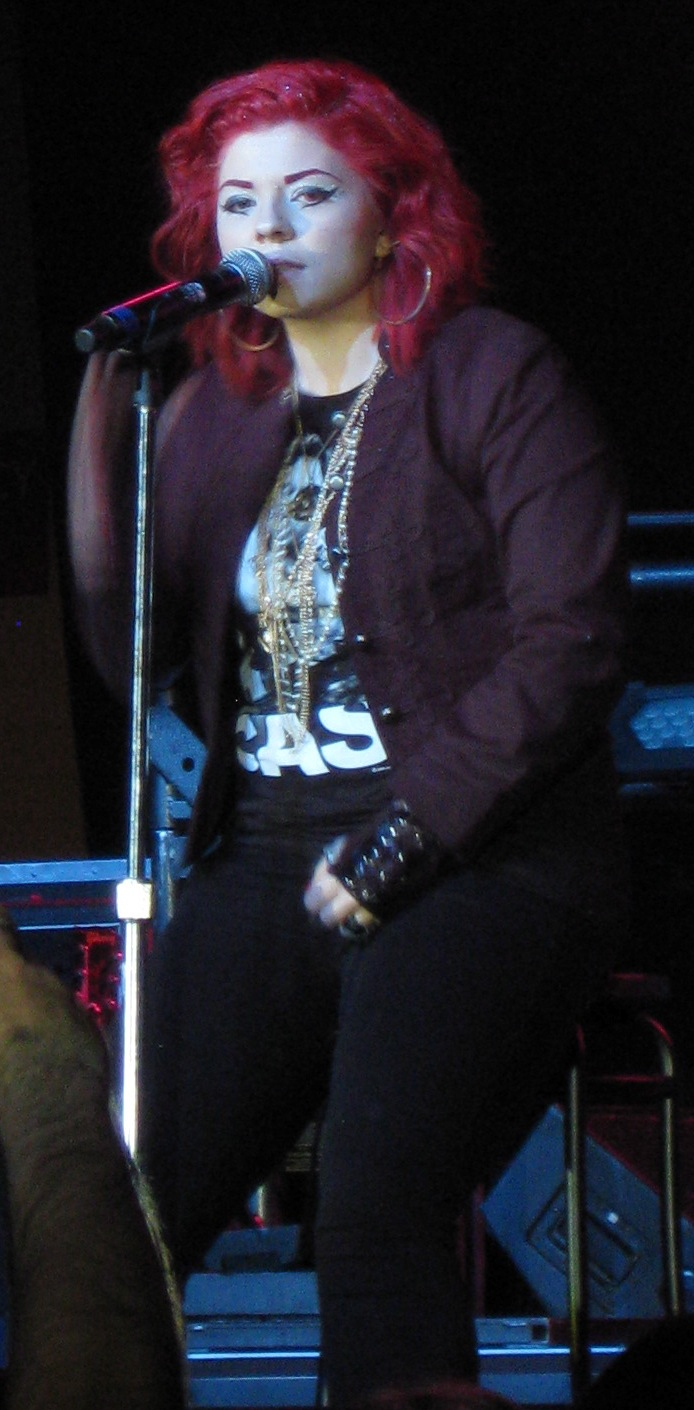
- Lyldoll performing in Edmonton in 2011

Background information
- Born: Shiloh Reann Hoganson; April 25, 1993 (age 33); Abbotsford, British Columbia, Canada
- Genres: Pop rock; pop punk; ska; hip hop; trap
- Occupation: Singer-songwriter
- Instrument: Vocals
- Years active: 2006–present
- Labels: Universal Music Canada; Universal Republic; Another Mother Music

Shiloh Reann Hoganson (born April 25, 1993), previously known mononymously as Shiloh (/ˈʃaɪloʊ/) and currently performing under the stage name Lyldoll, is a Canadian singer-songwriter. Shiloh has performed with Stereos, Hedley, Marianas Trench, and Faber Drive, and has been credited for writing in various hit songs, such as "Tonight I'm Getting Over You" by Carly Rae Jepsen. She has a mezzo-soprano vocal range.

== Early life ==
Shiloh was born in Abbotsford, British Columbia, and was raised in several locations in Saskatchewan as well as Edmonton, Alberta. Shiloh has Irish, Swedish, Ojibwe, Cree and Métis ancestry. She attended Allendale Junior High School until she was 13. Growing up, Shiloh was inspired by Michael Jackson and entered singing contests and competitions, starting at the age of 7, including a radio contest for The Bounce (91.7 CHBN-FM) in Edmonton, Alberta, which she won in 2006.

== Career ==
=== 2008–2010: Picture Imperfect and Can't Hold On ===
Shiloh traveled to Vancouver, British Columbia to work with songwriting–production team Hipjoint Productions, who wrote and produced seven songs on her debut album Picture Imperfect including the Canadian platinum-selling single "Operator (A Girl Like Me)".

She signed to Universal Music Canada in 2008 and to Universal Republic in early 2009, and released her debut album, Picture Imperfect, on August 18, 2009. The album yielded three singles.

"Operator (A Girl Like Me)" was the first single from Picture Imperfect. It charted on the Canadian Hot 100 and listed her as Billboard Canada's No. 1 Emerging Talent Artist as of December 19, 2008. The song is also included on Much Dance 2009 CD. Shiloh appeared on MuchOnDemand on June 4, 2009, and performed "Goodbye, You Suck". She was a nominee for the 2009 MuchMusic Video Awards as well as being an announced performer. She performed "Operator (A Girl Like Me)" at the MuchMusic Video Awards on June 21, 2009, but lost in both categories she was nominated in: Pop Video of the Year to Danny Fernandes and UR Fave: New Artist to The Midway State.

Shiloh appeared on YTV's The Zone segment and was interviewed by Carlos, answering viewer questions that had been submitted by e-mail and performing. She also appeared on season two of The Next Star, meeting the six finalists.

On August 27, 2009, she performed an acoustic cover of Michael Jackson's Man in the Mirror as a tribute to him at the Hamilton Place Theatre.

On December 1, 2009, she was also featured on War Child: 10, where she collaborated with The Cliks to cover Patti Smith's "People Have The Power".

On November 9, 2010, she released her final single as Shiloh, "Can't Hold On".

=== 2016–2019: 1993 ===
In 2016, Future 5th took over Shiloh's management from Tanjola. After her father died, she was inspired to make music once again and began work on her new album later titled 1993.

In 2017, Shiloh changed her stage name to Doll and later released a demo track called "Alien".

While the release of the album was delayed for personal issues, she released a demo called "Stealin'" on SoundCloud on January 28, 2018. The demo was unavailable on SoundCloud for a period of time, however at some point it was restored.

On September 13, 2018, Shiloh released the first single "SWM" from the delayed album. Around this time, she changed her stage name from Doll to Lyldoll. A second single, "New Love", was released on November 2, 2019, accompanied by a music video for the song was released on her Vevo channel. On November 15, 2019, she released the album 1993.

In April 2020, while in quarantine, she started working on a music video for the song Pillz, however it is presumed that the music video is cancelled since the updates have now been deleted.

=== 2021: Girl Gxd ===
On May 31, 2021, Lyldoll released the single "Rainbow" on streaming platforms. On an Instagram livestream, Hoganson announced that Rainbow was a teaser single for a new album and she also said she is going back to Los Angeles.

On October 1, 2021, Lyldoll released her third studio album titled Girl Gxd.

=== 2022: Unborn (Collaboration) ===
On April 21, 2022, YouTuber Jayniac Jr. (Darron Bailey Jr.) released the EP "Unborn" which included two covers of "Operator" in collaboration with Lyldoll.

=== 2024: Delranoir (Collaboration) ===
On April 21, 2024, one of the cover's of "Operator" from Unborn was remastered and released on Jayniac Jr.'s (Darron Bailey Jr.) Album Delranoir.

== Onision controversy ==
In 2019, allegations of child grooming and abuse were levied at Hoganson's former partner, YouTube personality Greg Jackson, known online as Onision. Shortly thereafter, Shiloh appeared on Chris Hansen's YouTube show, Have a Seat With Chris Hansen, where she spoke of abuse at the hands of Onision. Also in 2019, a YouTube sketch video of Shiloh and Onision was discovered, showing Onision's alleged abuse of Shiloh.

== Discography ==
=== Albums ===
List of albums, with selected details and chart positions
| Title | Details | Peak chart positions |
| Title | Details | CAN |
|---|---|---|
| Picture Imperfect | Released: August 18, 2009; Label: Universal Music Canada; Format: CD, digital download | 9 |
| 1993 | Released: November 15, 2019; Label: Another Mother Music; Format: CD, digital download, LP | — |
| GIRL GXD | Released: October 1, 2021; Label: Another Mother Music; Format: Digital download, LP | — |

=== Singles ===
- 2006
  - "All I Want"
- 2008
  - "Operator (A Girl Like Me)"
- 2009
  - "Goodbye, You Suck"
  - "Alright"
  - "I Remember"
- 2010
  - "Can't Hold On"
- 2018
  - "Stealin'"
  - "SWM"
- 2019
  - "New Love”
  - "Pillz”
  - "Higher”
- 2021
  - “Rainbow”
  - “Girl Gxd”
  - “Pieces”
  - “Demonz”

== Awards and nominations ==
| Year | Nominated work | Award | Category | Result |
|---|---|---|---|---|
| 2009 | Operator (A Girl Like Me) | MuchMusic Video Awards | Pop Video of the Year | Nominated |
| 2009 | Goodbye, You Suck | MuchMusic Video Awards | UR Fave: New Artist | Nominated |
| 2010 | | Juno Award | New Artist | Nominated |
