= Phil Lehmann =

Phil Lehmann is a music producer and songwriter as well as the founder of Vancouver based AMP Records. Phil's work with artists such as Kelly Rowland, Kreesha, Lexi Strate, and Stef Lang have led to his work on songs charting numerous times on the Canadian music charts.

His songs have been placed on shows such as "One Tree Hill", "Jane By Design", “Samantha Who?”, and "Degrassi: The Next Generation”.

For his work with Krystle Dos Santos he was awarded a Western Canadian Music Award. Phil also creates music with his own band, Dreamboat Money.
