= Kill the Lights (The New Cities album) =

Studio album by The New Cities
- Released: September 27, 2011
- Studio: Wild Studio (Saint-Zénon)
- Genre: Synthpop; synthrock; rock
- Length: 41:39
- Label: Sony Music Canada
- Producer: Blake Healy; The New Cities

The New Cities chronology
Lost in City Lights (2009)	Kill the Lights (2011)

Singles from Kill the Lights
- 1. "Heatwave" Released: June 16, 2011; 2. "The Hype" Released: October 10, 2011; 3. "Mugshot" Released: February 13, 2012; 4. "The New Rule" Released: February 19, 2013

Kill the Lights is the second and final studio album by dance-rock band The New Cities. Released on September 27, 2011, it includes the album's lead single, "Heatwave", co-written by The Matrix. The album also features the singles, "The Hype", "Mugshot" and "The New Rule". It was produced by the band and Blake Healy, formerly of Metro Station.

The album debuted at number 52 on the Canadian Albums Chart. In support of the album, the band toured in Quebec in December 2011, as well as opening for Avril Lavigne in Canada, during her 2011 Black Star Tour in October.

== Background and recording ==
On June 10, 2011, it was announced that the band was in Los Angeles, working on their second album. The group was also in Quebec to work on the album. The album was recorded at Wild Studio in Saint-Zénon, Quebec.

== Singles ==
The album's first single "Heatwave", was released on June 21, 2011. The song peaked at number 38 on the Canadian Hot 100. The second single from the album, "The Hype" was released on October 11, 2011, along with a music video that premiered on MuchMusic. The song peaked at number 55 on the Canadian Hot 100. On March 13, 2012, the album's third single "Mugshot" was released.The album's fourth and final single "The New Rule" was released on February 19, 2013.

== Critical reception ==
Professional ratings
Review scores
Source	Rating
Melodic	3/5 stars

Kaj Roth of Melodic wrote a positive review for the album, stating, "The Matrix and Blake Healy made sure this album would be a real party package of infectious choruses, irresistible grooves and a total sound orgasm of polished guitar riffs and synthesizers that feels like bubblegum in your mouth."

== Track listing ==
All tracks are written by The New Cities, with additional writers where noted.

Standard edition
No.	Title	Writer(s)	Length
1.	"The New Rule"	The Matrix	3:04
2.	"The Hype"	Don Mescall; Rob Wells	3:43
3.	"Heatwave"	The Matrix	3:14
4.	"Mugshot"	Xandy Barry	3:26
5.	"Murder Me"	Travis Huff	3:20
6.	"Get Connected"	Chuck Comeau; Pierre Bouvier	3:56
7.	"Love Me Deadly"	Comeau; Greig Nori; Bouvier	3:42
8.	"C.L.O.N.E."	Drew Ryan Scott; Marco Rakascan	3:20
9.	"Pretty Little Mess"	Blake Healy	3:05
10.	"Sorry But I'm Single"		3:29
11.	"In Your Eyes"		3:13
12.	"Sleep"		4:00
Total length:			41:39

== Personnel ==
Credits adapted from the album's liner notes.

The New Cities

- David Brown – lead vocals
- Julien Martre – backing vocals, bassist
- Christian Bergeron – guitarist
- Francis Fugere – drums
- Nicolas Denis – synth
- Philippe Lachance – synth

Engineer

- Blake Healy
- Christian Bergeron
- Martin Brunet
- Marc-Andre Roy
- Pierre Remillard

Mixer

- Joe Zook
- Dave Ogilvie

Mastering

- Pierre Remillard
- Brian Gardner

Photographer

- Raphael Ouellet

== Charts ==
Chart performance for Kill the Lights
Chart (2011)	Peak position
Canadian Albums (Nielsen SoundScan)	52

== Release history ==
Release history and formats for Kill the Lights
Region	Date	Format	Label	Ref.
Canada	September 27, 2011	CD; digital download	Sony Music Canada	
Various	October 4, 2011	Digital download	Sony Music Canada	
