= Never Again (The Midway State song) =

Single by The Midway State

from the album Holes
- Released: July 22, 2008
- Genre: Alternative rock, piano-rock, pop-rock
- Length: 3:30

"Never Again" is a song by The Midway State off their first studio album Holes. In 2009, the song reached No. 30 on the Canadian Hot 100 and was certified as a gold digital single by Music Canada.

== Reception ==
Professional ratings
Review scores
Source	Rating
The Beat Review	4/5 stars

"Never Again" received mixed reception from reviewers. Michael Crewe praised lead singer Nathan Ferraro for creating an energetic song with his "soaring falsetto", while The Beat Review opined that the song was too generic and that the band was unknown to listeners.

Alternatively, The Beat Review compared the band's piano performance to Keane and The Fray. Similarly, Arjun S. Ravi of Indiecision also compared The Midway State's piano rift to The Fray, and said that "Never Again" had a "simple piano-driven melody that builds into an arena-sized chorus".

== Music video ==
In the music video released by the band, the lead singer is looking for and reassembling the missing pieces of his girlfriend while he and the band perform at the lower platform of Bay station in Toronto.

== Awards and Certifications ==
In 2009, "Never Again" was certified gold by Music Canada for reaching 20,000 downloads, with 5,000 of the downloads being sold in Canada. The same year, "Never Again" won the VideoFACT Award at the MuchMusic Video Awards and was nominated for favourite video at the Canadian Independent Music Awards. The following year, the song was nominated for the adult contemporary category at the 2010 Canadian Radio Music Awards.

== Popular culture ==
The piano melody of "Never Again" was chosen as an automatic ring back by Rogers Wireless.

== Charts ==
Chart (2008)	Peak position
Canada (Canadian Hot 100)	30
