= The New Cities =

Canadian band

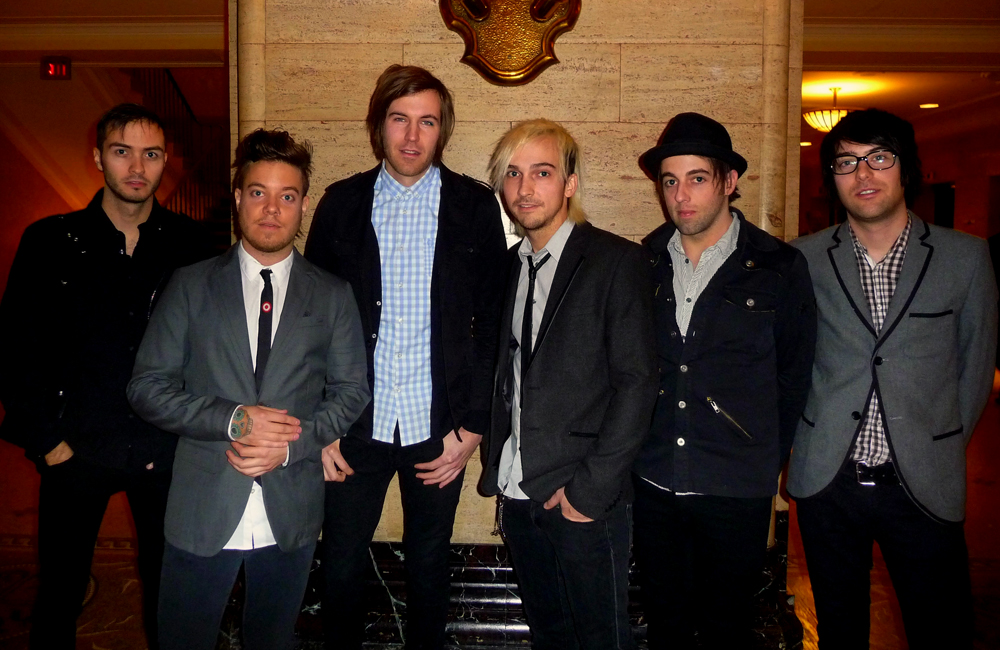
- The members of The New Cities. Left to right: Philippe Lachance, David Brown, Nicolas Denis, Christian Bergeron, Francis Fugere, Julien Martre.

Background information
- Origin: Trois-Rivières, Quebec, Canada
- Genres: Rock; synthpop; dance-rock; electro; pop punk; alternative rock
- Years active: 2005–2013; 2026–present
- Label: Sony Music Canada
- Members: David Brown; Christian Bergeron; Nicolas Denis; Francis Fugere; Philippe Lachance; Julien Martre
- Website: thenewcities.com

The New Cities is a Canadian dance-rock band originating from Trois-Rivières, Quebec, and based in Montreal, Quebec. Formed in 2005, the members of The New Cities consists of David Brown, Christian Bergeron, Nicolas Denis, Francis Fugere, Philippe Lachance, and Julien Martre.

In 2006, the band released their self-produced debut EP, The New Cities. In 2009, their debut studio album Lost in City Lights was released via Sony Music Canada. The group's second studio album Kill the Lights was released in 2011. The band was nominated for several awards including a Juno Award and ADISQ Award.

== History ==
=== 2005–2007: Early years ===
The New Cities formed in 2005, in Trois-Rivières, Quebec. The band recorded their first EP with producer Steve Nadeau in Montreal, Quebec, in early 2006. Self-produced by the band, they independently released it under the name The New Cities EP in March. The group also embarked on a tour in Canada. The band later met producer Greig Nori, who the band described as "their mentor" and began writing new material with him. They also partnered with Coalition Entertainment, who managed the group alongside Nori.

=== 2008–2010: Lost in City Lights ===
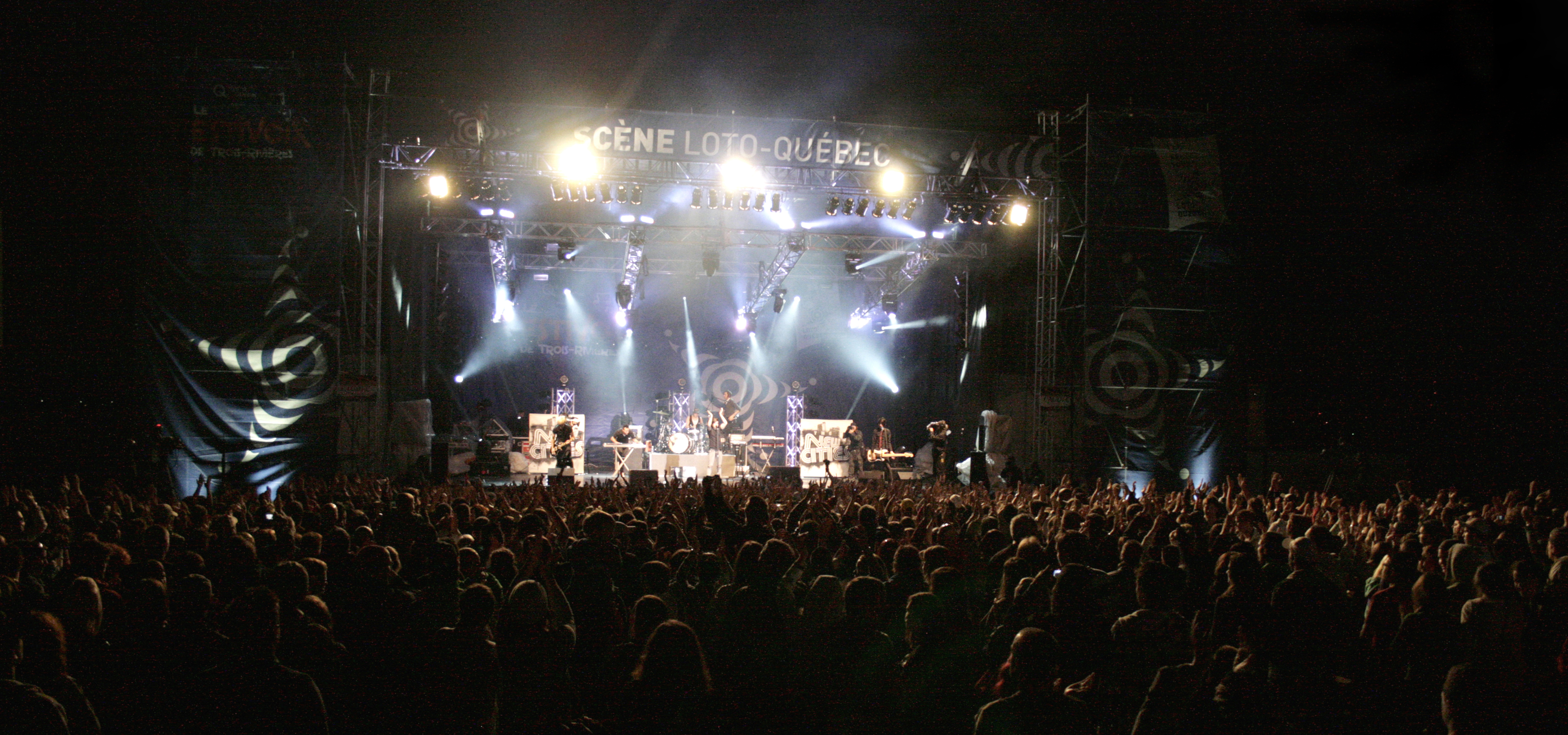
The New Cities headlining at the Festi-Voix on June 29th 2010, Trois-Rivières, Quebec.

The band signed a record deal with Sony Music Canada in October 2008. In January 2009, the band opened for Hedley during a tour in Quebec. On February 24, 2009, the band released their debut single "Dead End Countdown". The song peaked at No. 16 on the Canadian Hot 100, won the 2010 SOCAN Pop/Rock Music Award and was nominated in 2 categories at the Canadian Radio Music Awards. The music video for the song was nominated at the 2009 MuchMusic Video Awards for Post-Production of the Year.

Following their signing with Sony Music Canada, the band released their first full-length album Lost in City Lights on May 5, 2009. In support of the album, the band toured across Canada in the fall of 2009, alongside Ten Second Epic. The group also performed on MuchOnDemand in June 2009. The band performed at 1,000 Islands Music Festival in August, joining Simple Plan, ILL Scarlett, Plain White T's, the Arkells and Lights, among many more at the event.

The New Cities' second single "Leaders of the Misled" was released on August 11, 2009. The song reached No. 99 on the Canadian Hot 100. It was also featured in the television movie Degrassi Takes Manhattan, part of Season 9 of the television series Degrassi: The Next Generation. The track "Lost in City Lights" was featured in the third season of Gossip Girl.

The band continued touring, having opened for major acts such as The Black Eyed Peas, Katy Perry, Nine Inch Nails, and Metric. They also toured in Europe, with shows in the United Kingdom and France in the winter of 2009–2010.

In 2010, the band was nominated at the Juno Awards for Breakthrough Group of the Year. On March 23, the album's third single "Hypertronic Superstar" was released. The song peaked at No. 58 on the Canadian Hot 100. In April, the band supported Faber Drive on the Can't Keep a Secret tour along with These Kids Wear Crowns, Jesse Labelle and The Latency. The music video for "Dead End Countdown" was released in the UK and Ireland in March 2010, and was added to Kerrang! TV, Scuzz TV, NME TV, Chart Show TV and The Box playlists. The video reached No. 10 on the Kerrang! TV's "Most Wanted". On April 26, the song was released in the UK. From June to July, the group supported Emily Osment on the MuchMusic SodaPOP music festival.

=== 2011–2013: Kill the Lights and hiatus ===
On June 10, 2011, it was announced that the band was in Los Angeles, working on their second album. The group was also working on the album in Quebec. It was expected to be released around the summer or fall of that year. Singer David Brown described the upcoming record as "more electronic, but with a strong rock influence still present." The first single released from the album called "Heatwave", was co-written by the band and The Matrix. It was released on June 21, 2011. In July, the band released footage of the band recording the single and shooting their album cover.

The band's second studio album, Kill the Lights was released on September 27, 2011. It was produced by Blake Healy of Metro Station. The album's second single "The Hype" was released in October 2011. A music video for the song was released on October 11. The song peaked at No. 55 on the Canadian Hot 100. Following the release of their new album, the band joined Avril Lavigne in Canada to support her 2011 Black Star Tour in October. The band concluded the year by touring in Quebec in December.

On March 13, 2012, the band released the album's third single "Mugshot". A music video for the song was also released. Notable performances in 2012 include the SXSW festival in Austin, Texas, and the Bamboozle festival in Asbury Park, New Jersey. The group also performed at CHUM-FM's FanFest concert, along with Carly Rae Jepsen, Marianas Trench and Fefe Dobson, among many others.

On February 19, 2013, the album's fourth single "The New Rule" was released. Following the release of the single, little activity came from the band, only performing three concert shows, including one at the Blainville en Fête. That same year, the group was dropped by Sony Music Canada and as a result, had to decide whether to secure a new record deal or put the band on hiatus. Bassist Julien Martre began releasing solo music around that time.

The music video for "The New Rule" was nominated for Best Lo-fi at the 2014 Berlin Music Video Awards. The band's hiatus was confirmed in September 2014, when Martre co-formed a side project with drummer and bandmate Francis Fugere, called Zenith. In an interview with L'echo De Maskinonge, he said, "We've wanted to do our own project for a long time and now is the right time to launch it."

=== 2026–present: Return ===
On August 7, 2026, The New Cities posted on social media, hinting for a return in 2027. Additionally, the band signed with L'Ours Label & Tournées to help plan their 2027 concert tour. Members of the band had already discussed a comeback for a few years and would do so if "we missed ourselves and the energy a lot." In 2025, they brought up the possibility of a reunion, which singer David Brown said "made a difference. I think we did some good for people. Inevitably, it felt good to know that too." He also confirmed that the band had written some material before and during their hiatus, and was unsure if it would be released. He concluded, "It would be interesting to see what The New Cities might sound like in 2027... There might be some surprises."

== Musical styles and influences ==
The band's music is described as rock, synthpop, dance-rock, electro, pop punk and alternative rock. Singer David Brown said the band's influences consists of The Killers and Death from Above.

== Members ==
=== Former members ===
- David Brown – lead vocals (2005–2013)
- Julien Martre – backing vocals, bassist (2008–2013)
- Christian Bergeron – guitarist (2005–2013)
- Francis Fugere – drums (2007–2013)
- Nicolas Denis – synth (2005–2013)
- Philippe Lachance – synth (2005–2013)

== Discography ==
=== Studio albums ===
List of albums, with selected chart positions
| Title | Album details | Peak chart positions |
| Title | Album details | CAN |
|---|---|---|
| Lost in City Lights | Released: May 5, 2009; Label: Sony Music Canada; Format: CD, digital download | 48 |
| Kill the Lights | Released: September 27, 2011; Label: Sony Music Canada; Format: CD, digital download | 52 |

=== Extended plays ===
List of extended plays with selected details
| Title | EP details |
|---|---|
| The New Cities EP | Released: March 2006; Label: Independent; Format: CD |
| Dead End Countdown EP | Released: April 26, 2010; Label: Red Ink; Format: Digital download, streaming |

=== Singles ===
List of singles, with selected chart positions and certifications, showing year released and album name
| Title | Year | Peak chart positions | | | Certifications | Album |
| Title | Year | CAN | CAN CHR | CAN HAC | Certifications | Album |
|---|---|---|---|---|---|---|
| "Dead End Countdown" | 2009 | 16 | 8 | 10 | MC: Gold | Lost in City Lights |
| "Leaders of the Misled" | 2009 | 99 | 28 | — | | Lost in City Lights |
| "Hypertronic Superstar" | 2010 | 58 | 28 | 39 | | Lost in City Lights |
| "Heatwave" | 2011 | 38 | 11 | 14 | | Kill the Lights |
| "The Hype" | 2011 | 55 | 24 | — | | Kill the Lights |
| "Mugshot" | 2012 | — | — | — | | Kill the Lights |
| "The New Rule" | 2013 | — | — | — | | Kill the Lights |
"—" denotes releases that did not chart.

=== Compilation appearances ===
| Album | Date of Release | Label | Song(s) | Notes |
|---|---|---|---|---|
| Juno Awards 2010 | Mar 30, 2010 | Sony Music Canada | "Dead End Countdown" | |
| NRJ Hit Liste 2010 | Apr 6, 2010 | Sony Music Canada | "Leaders of the Misled" | |
| 10 Dollar DJ - Canada Day* | Nov 2, 2010 | Sony Music Canada | "Dead End Countdown" | iTunes Canada exclusive. |

=== Music videos ===
List of music videos, showing year released and director
| Title | Year | Director | Ref. |
|---|---|---|---|
| "Dead End Countdown" | 2009 | Jodeb | |
| "Leaders of the Misled" | 2009 | Jodeb | |
| "Hypertronic Superstar" | 2010 | Frank Borin | |
| "Looks Minus Substance" | 2010 | Jodeb, David Brown | |
| "Heatwave" | 2011 | John Poliquin | |
| "The Hype" | 2011 | John Poliquin | |
| "Mugshot" | 2012 | Colin Minihan | |
| "The New Rule" | 2013 | MatCyr | |

=== Appearances in other media ===
- 2009. Their song "Lost in City Lights" was used in Season 3 of Gossip Girl.
- 2009. Their song "Dead End Countdown" was used in Season 2, Episode 4 of So You Think You Can Dance Canada.
- 2010. Their song "Hypertronic Superstar" was used in Season 3, Episode 5 of So You Think You Can Dance Canada.
- 2010. Their song "Leaders of the Misled" was used in the film Degrassi Takes Manhattan.

== Awards and nominations ==
| Year | Nominee / work | Award | Result |
|---|---|---|---|
| 2014 | "The New Rule" | Berlin Music Video Awards "Best Lo-Fi" | Nominated |
| 2012 | "Heatwave" | MuchMusic Video Awards "Post-Production of the Year" | Nominated |
| 2010 | "Dead End Countdown" | SOCAN "Pop/Rock Music Award" | Won |
| 2010 | "The New Cities" | JUNO Canada's Music Awards "New Group of the Year" | Nominated |
| 2010 | "Lost in City Lights" | ADISQ "Album Anglophone de l'année" | Nominated |
| 2010 | "The New Cities" | Canadian Radio Music Awards "Best New group or solo artist of the year (HOT AC)" | Nominated |
| 2010 | "The New Cities" | Canadian Radio Music Awards "Best New group or solo artist of the year (CHR)" | Nominated |
| 2009 | "Dead End Countdown" | MuchMusic Video Awards "Post-Production of the Year" | Nominated |
