= The Midway State =

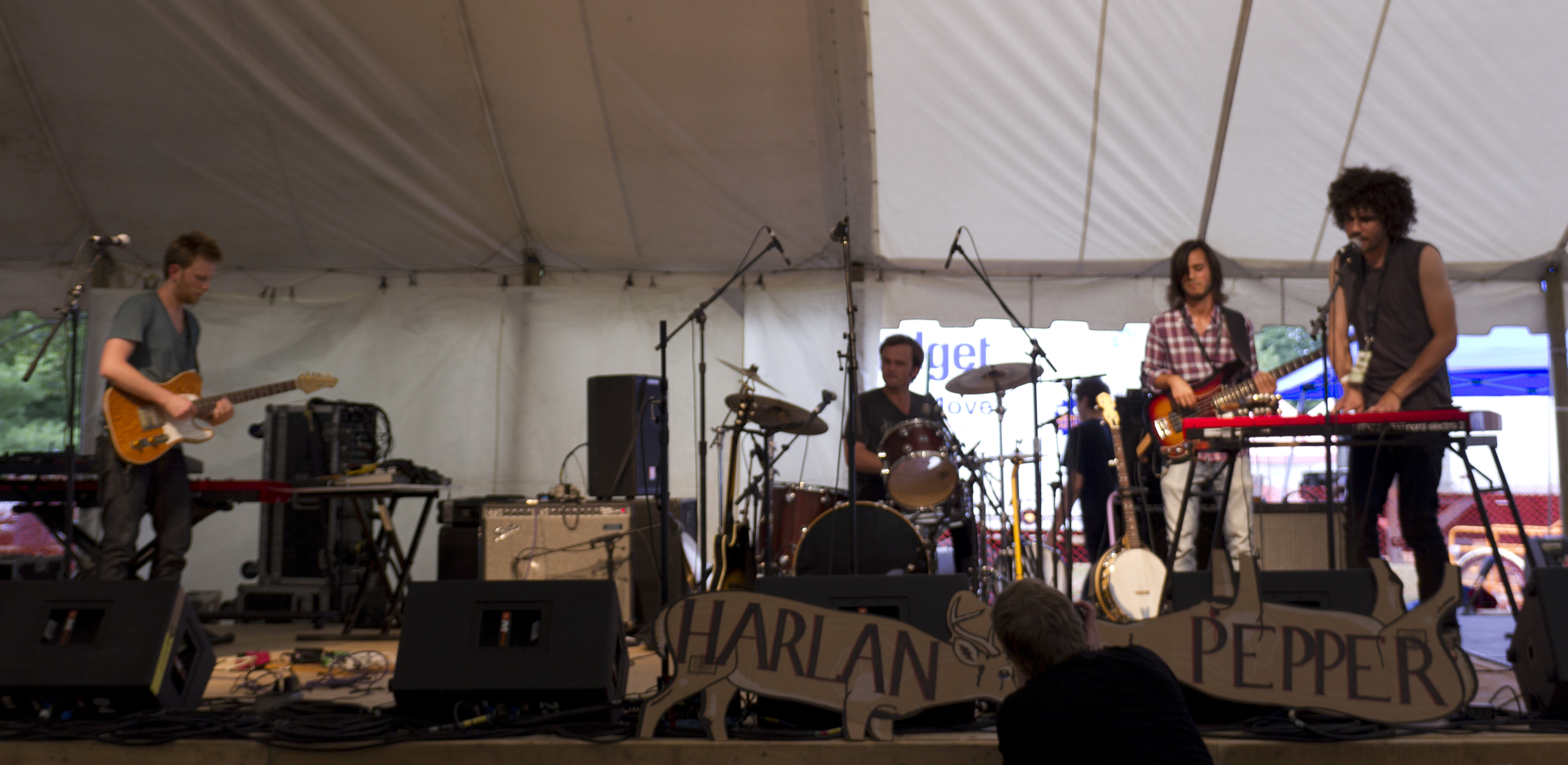
- The Midway State performing at the 2011 Hillside Festival

Background information
- Origin: Collingwood, Ontario, Canada
- Genres: Alternative rock, piano rock
- Years active: 2007–2013, 2016
- Label: Remedy Music / Interscope
- Past members: Nathan Ferraro; Daenen Bramberger; Mike Wise; Mike Kirsh; Tyler Armes
- Website: The Midway State (tumblr.com, Archived)

The Midway State is a Canadian alternative rock band from Collingwood and Wasaga Beach, Ontario, signed to Remedy Records for North America and to Universal Publishing for the world outside. They debuted with Holes in 2008, followed by Paris or India in 2011.

== History ==
The band has done several tours throughout North America and Europe, opening for acts such as Death Cab for Cutie, Silversun Pickups, Kate Nash, Shiny Toy Guns, Mika, Jimmy Eat World, Third Eye Blind, and k-os. In May 2007, their song "A Million Fireflies" was featured on the NME compilation disc Canadian Blast that was released as a promotion attached to the magazine.

"Never Again" from the album, Holes, was used as the default ringback for customers on the Rogers Wireless network in Canada.

In 2009, the band recorded a cover of Peter Gabriel's "Don't Give Up" with Lady Gaga. They later shot a music video. Never officially released, the track and video were leaked to the world online. The band was nominated for two Juno Awards and voted Best New Artist at the MuchMusic Video Awards by viewers. Their song "Unaware" was featured during the final minutes of the Fox show The O.C.

On May 5, 2011, they opened for Third Eye Blind at the Sound Academy in Toronto. Their second album, Paris or India, was released on July 19, 2011 and debuted at #42 on the Canadian Albums Chart. On July 25, 2011, they were the support act for their old bandmate, Tyler Armes' band, Down With Webster, at Edmonton's Capital Ex.

In 2016, they released a song called "Crystalized" under the name, Nathan John and the Midway State.

Ferraro has gone on to be a songwriting and producing collaborator for other artists, notably on Beyoncé's 2024 single "Texas Hold 'Em".

== Past members ==
- Nathan Ferraro – Vocals/Piano/Synths
- Daenen Bramberger – Drums
- Mike Wise – Guitar
- Mike Kirsh – Bass

== Discography ==
=== Paris or India (2011) ===
1. Alive
2. Atlantic
3. Fire
4. All Anew
5. Paris or India
6. Lightning
7. Hartley Salter's Kite
8. Heart Of Glass
9. Litebrite
10. St. Paul And The Wolf

=== Holes (2008) ===
1. Never Again
2. Change for You
3. Nobody Understands
4. Fireflies
5. Unaware
6. Can't Stop Waking Up to You
7. Holes
8. Where Did We Go?
9. Hold My Head Up
10. Fire Keeps On Burning
11. I Know
12. No Crying
13. Time to Move On (iTunes Bonus Track)

=== Met a Man on Top of the Hill EP (2007) ===
1. Met a Man on Top of the Hill
2. Change for You
3. Nobody Understands
4. A Million Fireflies

=== Eponymous (2006) ===
1. Met a Man on Top of the Hill
2. Change for You
3. Unaware
4. Nobody Understands
5. A Million Fireflies

=== Wide Eyed (2003) ===
1. Barefoot
2. Amie
3. Everytime We Die
4. Stupid Love Songs
5. New Girl
6. Hold On
7. Ruby

=== Stay Calm...It Will Always Be (2003) ===
1. Not the One
2. All His Angels
3. My Breath Away
4. A Million Fireflies
5. Reckless

=== Other work ===
1. "Don't Give Up", originally by Peter Gabriel and Kate Bush (Duet with Lady Gaga).
2. "True", a Spandau Ballet cover, along with a song of their own titled "New York Sky" was featured in the soundtrack to the film Textuality.
3. "Run To You" (a Bryan Adams cover) was used for the promotion of the mini-series Camelot by CBC.

== Awards and nominations ==
- In 2009, Holes was nominated for "Best Pop Album", while Ferraro was nominated "Songwriter of the Year" at the Juno Awards
- On June 21, 2009, they won "Favourite New Artist" and "Best "Independent Video" for "Never Again" at the MuchMusic Video Awards.
