= Down with Webster discography =

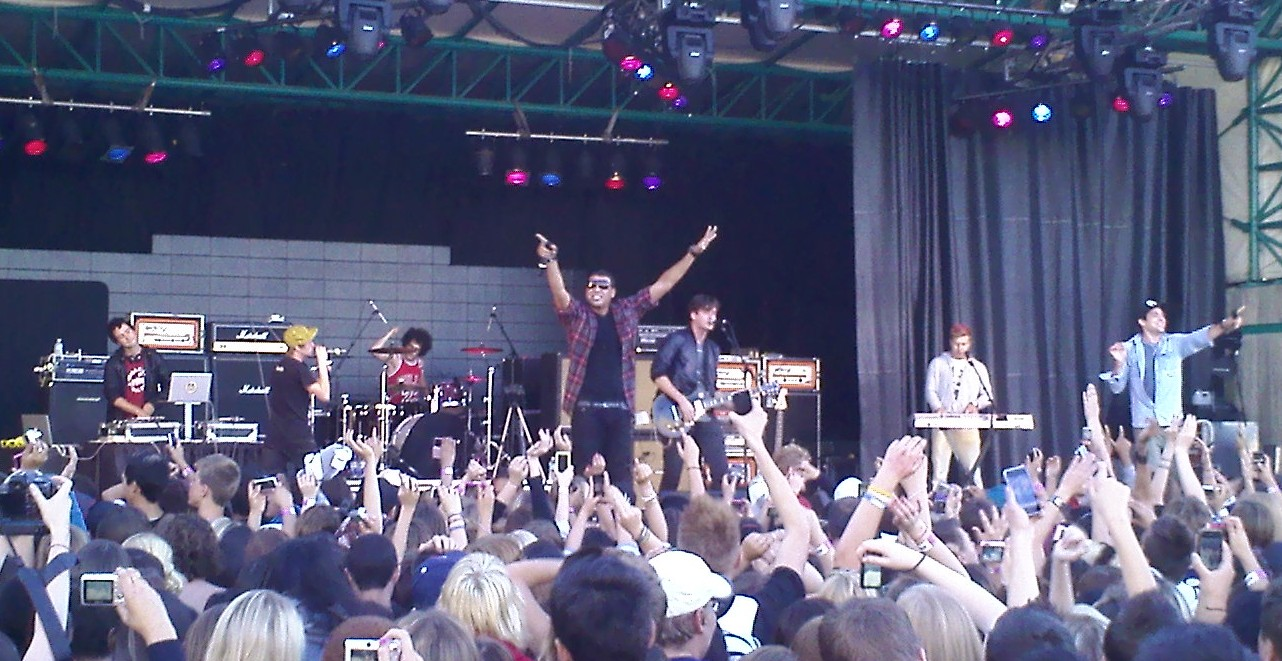
- Down With Webster performing at Edmonton's Capital Ex in 2010
- Studio albums: 4
- Extended plays: 3
- Singles: 16
- Music videos: 12
- Promotional singles: 4

The discography of Canadian rap rock/pop rock band, Down with Webster consists of four studio albums, three extended plays, sixteen singles, four promotional singles and twelve music videos. The band has sold over 100,000 albums and 800,000 singles.

The group released their debut self-titled album independently on June 26, 2007. They later attained commercial success with the release of the 2009 EP, Time to Win, Vol. I, which consisted of the singles "Rich Girl$", "Your Man" and "Whoa is Me". The EP peaked at number 50 on the Canadian Albums Chart. Their major-label debut album, Time to Win, Vol. II (2011) included the songs "She's Dope", “Big Wheels” and “Royalty.” The album and 2014 follow-up album Party For Your Life reached number nine and number two on the Canadian Albums Chart respectively. The latter spawned the singles "One in a Million" and "Chills." The group released their fifth and final studio album V, on January 29, 2021.

== Albums ==
=== Studio albums ===
List of albums, with chart positions and sales
Title	Album details	Peak chart positions	Sales
Title	Album details	CAN	Sales
Down with Webster	Released: June 26, 2007; Label: Self-released; Formats: CD	—	
Time to Win, Vol. II	Released: October 31, 2011; Label: Universal Music; Formats: CD, digital download, LP	9	CAN: 6,000
Party for Your Life	Released: January 28, 2014; Label: Universal Music; Formats: CD, digital download	2	CAN: 6,500
V	Released: January 29, 2021; Label: DWW Entertainment; Formats: Digital download	—	
"—" denotes a release that did not chart, or was not released in that territory.

== Extended plays ==
List of extended plays, with selected chart positions, sales and certifications
Title	Album details	Peak chart positions	Sales	Certifications
Title	Album details	CAN	Sales	Certifications
The Reverb Session July '03	Released: July, 2003; Label: Self-released; Formats: CD	—		
Time to Win, Vol. I	Released: October 6, 2009; Label: Universal Motown/Universal Music; Formats: CD, digital download	50	CAN: 40,000	MC: Gold
iTunes Session	Released: December 20, 2011; Label: Universal; Formats: Digital download	—		
"—" denotes a release that did not chart, or was not released in that territory.

== Singles ==
List of singles, with selected chart positions, showing year released and album name
Title	Year	Peak chart positions				Certifications	Album
Title	Year	CAN	CAN AC	CAN CHR	CAN HAC	Certifications	Album
"Weekends"	2006	—	—	—	—		Down with Webster
"Miracle Mile"	2007	—	—	—	—		Down with Webster
"Rich Girl$"	2009	21	—	13	41	MC: Platinum	Time to Win, Vol. 1
"Your Man"	2010	12	—	9	7	MC: Platinum	Time to Win, Vol. 1
"Whoa Is Me"	2010	13	—	15	43	MC: 2× Platinum	Time to Win, Vol. 1
"She's Dope"	2011	18	—	13	40	MC: Platinum	Time to Win, Vol. 2
"Big Wheels"	2011	51	—	23	43		Time to Win, Vol. 2
"Royalty"	2012	75	—	—	—		Time to Win, Vol. 2
"Jessica"	2012	—	—	—	—		Time to Win, Vol. 2
"One in a Million"	2013	27	—	12	22	MC: Platinum	Party For Your Life
"Party for Your Life"	2013	67	—	—	—		Party For Your Life
"Chills"	2013	19	21	13	16	MC: Platinum	Party For Your Life
"Love Is Not Enough"	2020	—	—	—	—		V
"Take Us Alive"	2020	—	—	—	—		V
"Okae"	2025	—	—	—	—		TBA
"All Night"	2025	—	—	39	—		TBA
"—" denotes a recording that did not chart or was not released in that territory.

=== Promotional singles ===
List of promotional singles, with selected chart positions, showing year released and album name
Title	Year	Peak chart positions	Album
Title	Year	CAN	Album
"Back of My Hand"	2009	—	Time to Win, Vol. 1
"Time to Win"	2009	—	Time to Win, Vol. 1
"G.T.F.O"	2011	—	Non-album single
"Professional"	2011	— (Note: "Professional" did not enter the Canadian Hot 100, but peaked at number 64 on the Hot Canadian Digital Song Sales component chart.)	Time to Win, Vol. 2
"—" denotes a recording that did not chart or was not released in that territory.

== Other charted songs ==
List of other charted songs, with selected chart positions, showing year released and album name
Title	Year	Peak chart positions	Album
Title	Year	CAN	Album
"Staring at the Sun"	2011	— (Note: "Staring at the Sun" did not enter the Canadian Hot 100, but peaked at number 74 on the Hot Canadian Digital Song Sales component chart.)	Time to Win, Vol. 2

== Guest appearances ==
List of songs with guest appearances by Down with Webster
Title	Year	Album	Artist	Ref.
"Runaway"	2011	Punk Goes Pop 4	Silverstein (featuring Camm Hunter of Down with Webster)	
"Paint it Gold (Remix)"	2013	—N/a	Fake Shark Real Zombie (featuring Pat Gillett, Anami Vice & Matt Webb)	
"Saturday Night"	2013	Hockey Anthems:Second Period/ Rockies	Down with Webster	'
"Get Weird (Kevvy's Dead By Dawn Remix)"	2013	—N/a	Kevvy (featuring Camm Hunter & Bucky)	

== Music videos ==
Title	Year	Director(s)	Ref.
"Miracle Mile"	2007	Geoff McLean	
"Time To Win"	2009	Ben Shirinian	
"Rich Girl$"	2009	Josh Forbes	
"Your Man"	2010	Aaron A	
"Whoa Is Me"	2010	Aaron A	
"She's Dope"	2011	Aaron A	
"Big Wheels"	2011	Aaron A	
"Royalty"	2012	Chris Wong	
"Jessica"	2012	Chris Wong and Pasha Patriki	
"One In a Million"	2013	Aaron A and Simon Shohet	
"Party For Your Life"	2013	Aaron A	
"Chills"	2014	Aaron A	
