= List of Down with Webster concert tours =

This is a list of headlining concert tours by Down with Webster.

== WINtour 2010 ==
WINtour 2010
- Tour by Down with Webster
- Location: Canada & United States
- Associated album: Time to Win, Vol. 1
- Start date: January 7, 2010
- End date: February 1, 2010
- No. of shows: 17

WINtour 2010 was Down with Websters first headlining tour. The band played 15 shows in the United States and Canada.

=== Tour dates ===
Date	City	Country	Venue
North America
January 7, 2010	Halifax	Canada	Toothy Moose
January 8, 2010	Halifax	Canada	Halifax Pavilion
January 13, 2010	Waterloo	Canada	Wax
January 14, 2010	St. Catharines	Canada	Level 3
January 15, 2010	Toronto	Canada	Sound Academy
January 16, 2010	London	Canada	London Music Hall
January 17, 2010	Buffalo	United States	Mohawk
January 18, 2010	Pittsburgh	United States	Mr. Smalls
January 19, 2010	Detroit	United States	Pike Room
January 26, 2010	Minneapolis	United States	Station 4
January 27, 2010	Winnipeg	Canada	Pyramid
January 28, 2010	Saskatoon	Canada	Louis
January 29, 2010	Edmonton	Canada	Starlite
January 30, 2010	Calgary	Canada	SAIT Gateway
February 1, 2010	Vancouver	Canada	Venue

Canceled dates

- January 20, 2010 - Indianapolis, United States
- January 22, 2010 - Chicago, United States
- January 23, 2010 - Green Bay, United States
- January 24, 2010 - Madison, United States

== WINtour 2011 ==
WINtour 2011
- Tour by Down with Webster
- Location: Canada
- Associated album: Time to Win, Vol. 2
- Start date: February 22, 2011
- End date: March 12, 2011
- No. of shows: 15

WINtour 2011 is a tour by Down with Webster to support their album, Time to Win, Vol. 2. It began on February 22 in Lethbridge, Alberta and ended on March 12 in Toronto, Ontario. Sweet Thing and 2AM Club are opened for the band on this tour. 2AM Club replaced New Politics who were going to open but had a change of plans.

=== Setlist ===
1. "Go Time"
2. "Time to Win"
3. "Bass"
4. "She's Dope"
5. "Rich Girl$"
6. "Ten"
7. "Big Wheels"
8. "Get Wrong"
9. "Staring at the Sun"
10. "Back Of My Hand"
11. "Heartbeat"
12. "Light The Night"
13. "G.T.F.O."
14. "Your Man"
15. "Whoa Is Me"

=== Tour dates ===
Date	City	Country	Venue
North America
February 22, 2011	Lethbridge	Canada	Bully's Sport and Entertainment Centre
February 23, 2011	Red Deer	Canada	Lotus
February 25, 2011	Vancouver	Canada	Vogue Theatre
February 26, 2011	Vancouver	Canada	Vogue Theatre
February 28, 2011	Banff	Canada	Wild Bills
March 2, 2011	Edmonton	Canada	Edmonton Events Centre
March 3, 2011	Calgary	Canada	Macewan Hall
March 4, 2011	Saskatoon	Canada	Odeon Events Centre
March 5, 2011	Winnipeg	Canada	Burton Cummings Theatre
March 7, 2011	Sault Ste. Marie	Canada	Kiwanis Community Theatre Centre
March 8, 2011	North Bay	Canada	Capitol Centre
March 9, 2011	Kingston	Canada	The Ale House
March 10, 2011	Ottawa	Canada	Bronson Centre
March 11, 2011	Montreal	Canada	Métropolis
March 12, 2011	Toronto	Canada	Massey Hall

== WINtour 2012 ==
WINtour 2012
- Tour by Down with Webster
- Location: Canada
- Associated album: Time to Win, Vol. 2
- Start date: January 13, 2012
- End date: February 24, 2012
- No. of shows: 14

WINtour 2012 is a tour by Down with Webster. The band will tour across Canada in January 2011 and February 2011. Canadian musical duo Ubiquitous Synergy Seeker (USS) was the opener.

=== Tour dates ===
Date	City	Country	Venue
North America
January 13, 2012	Greater Sudbury	Canada	Caruso Club
January 20, 2012	Montreal	Canada	Metropolis
January 24, 2012	Belleville	Canada	The Empire Theatre
January 25, 2012	Sherbrooke	Canada	Théâtre Centennial
January 26, 2012	Quebec City	Canada	Impérial De Quebec
January 27, 2012	Saguenay	Canada	Théâtre Palace Arvida
February 7, 2012	St. Catharines	Canada	Barracuda Pretty
February 15, 2012	Winnipeg	Canada	Burton Cummings Theatre
February 16, 2012	Winkler	Canada	Centennial Concert Hall
February 17, 2012	Saskatoon	Canada	Odeon Events Centre
February 18, 2012	Fort McMurray	Canada	Nexen Field House
February 22, 2012	Nanaimo	Canada	Port Theatre
February 23, 2012	Victoria	Canada	McPherson Playhouse
February 24, 2012	Kelowna	Canada	Kelowna Community Theatre

== The Warm Up Tour ==
The Warm Up Tour
- Tour by Down with Webster
- Location: United States
- Associated album: Time to Win, Vol. 2
- Start date: January 31, 2012
- End date: February 13, 2012
- No. of shows: 12

The Warm Up Tour is a tour of the United States by Down with Webster. FreeSol was going to co-headline the tour but had to pull out due to scheduling issues.

=== Tour dates ===
Date	City	Country	Venue
North America
January 31, 2012	Vienna	United States	Jammin' Java
February 1, 2012	New York City	United States	Santos
February 2, 2012	Cambridge	United States	The Middle East
February 3, 2012	Allentown	United States	Crocodile Rock Cafe
February 4, 2012	Lancaster	United States	The Chameleon Club
February 6, 2012	Philadelphia	United States	North Star Bar
February 8, 2012	Pittsburgh	United States	Smiling Moose
February 9, 2012	Columbus	United States	A and R Music Bar
February 10, 2012	Pontiac	United States	The Pike Room
February 11, 2012	Chicago	United States	Schubas
February 12, 2012	Madison	United States	The Loft
February 13, 2012	Minneapolis	United States	Triple Rock Social Club

== Wintour IV: Party For Your Life ==
Wintour IV
- Tour by Down with Webster
- Location: Canada
- Associated album: Party For Your Life
- Start date: January 29, 2014
- End date: September 26, 2014
- No. of shows: 18

In January & February 2014, the openers were D-Pryde and Sonreal. In September 2014, Dirty Radio performed at the shows in the Atlantic Canada region.

=== Tour dates ===
Date	City	Country	Venue
January 29, 2014	Vancouver	Canada	Vogue Theatre
January 30, 2014	Kelowna	Canada	Flashbacks
January 31, 2014	Edmonton	Canada	Winspear Centre
February 1, 2014	Calgary	Canada	Macewan Hall
February 2, 2014	Saskatoon	Canada	O’Brians Event Centre
February 3, 2014	Winnipeg	Canada	The Garrick Centre
February 5, 2014	Thunderbay	Canada	Community Auditorium
February 7, 2014	Toronto	Canada	Sound Academy
February 11, 2014	London	Canada	London Concert Theatre
February 12, 2014	Ottawa	Canada	Bronson Centre
February 14, 2014	Montreal	Canada	Corona Theatre
February 21, 2014	Barrie	Canada	The Ranch Concert Hall
September 19, 2014	Fredericton	Canada	Exhibit Centre
September 20, 2014	Halifax	Canada	Rebecca Cohn Centre
September 21, 2014	Truro	Canada	Marigold Theatre
September 24, 2014	St. John's	Canada	Mile One Centre
September 25, 2014	Clarenville	Canada	Events Centre
September 26, 2014	Corner Brook	Canada	Pepsi Centre
