= One in a Million (Down with Webster song) =

2013 Single by Down with Webster

Single by Down with Webster

from the album Party for Your Life
- Released: March 26, 2013
- Recorded: 2013
- Genre: Pop; pop rap
- Length: 3:14
- Label: Universal Music
- Songwriters: Down with Webster; Ludwig Göransson
- Producer: Göransson

Down with Webster singles chronology
"Jessica" (2012)	"One in a Million" (2013)	"Party for Your Life" (2013)

Music video
- "One in a Million" on YouTube

"One in a Million" is a song by Canadian pop-rap band Down with Webster. It was released as the first single from their third studio album Party for Your Life on March 26, 2013. The song was certified platinum in December 2013.

== Composition ==
"One in a Million" was written by members of the band and was produced by Ludwig Göransson who also co-wrote the song. Cameron Hunter spoke about the track's meaning with the Calgary Journal:

"'One in a Million' is about playing with so many bands after so many years. We've seen so many bands quit, give up, fall off or not really follow through with it, and we are like, 'Wow! We are the only ones left.' Out of the people we came up with we are the only ones that are still thriving and doing it. We are like, 'That's like a one in a million chance that we would be kind of where we are right now.'"

== Critical reception ==
MuchMusic stated, "With an upbeat tempo (think more 'Big Wheels than 'Royalty'), Down With Webster are continuing to take exciting risks with their music, incorporating what sounds like steel drums into the track, giving 'One In A Million' a Vampire Weekend-like vibe."

== Music video ==
Down with Webster in their light- up suits in the "One in a Million" music video

After debuting the track live as part of their opening slot at Marianas Trench's tour in fall 2012, the band released the song officially with an accompanying lyric video on March 20, 2013. The official music video for the song premiered on May 6, 2013, and was directed by Aaron A. It features the band performing in a studio with projections playing behind them. The video also includes shots of the lakefront in Toronto and live shots from their concerts. The video was nominated for Pop Video of the Year at the 2013 MuchMusic Video Awards.

== Chart performance ==
"One in a Million" entered the Canadian Hot 100 chart at number 57 and peaked at number 27. In addition, the song also peaked at number 12 on the Canada CHR/Top 40 chart and number 22 on the Canada Hot AC chart.

== Charts ==
=== Weekly charts ===
Weekly chart performance for "One in a Million"
Chart (2013)	Peak position
Canada Hot 100 (Billboard)	27
Canada CHR/Top 40 (Billboard)	12
Canada Hot AC (Billboard)	22

=== Year-end charts ===
Year-end chart performance for "One in a Million"
Chart (2013)	Position
Canada (Canadian Hot 100)	84

== Certifications ==
Region	Certification	Certified units/sales
Canada (Music Canada)	Platinum	80,000^{*}
^{*} Sales figures based on certification alone.
