= Juno Awards of 2011 =

Edition of annual Canadian music award

- Date: 26–27 March 2011
- Venue: Air Canada Centre, Toronto
- Hosted by: Drake

Television/radio coverage
- Network: CTV

The Juno Awards of 2011 honoured Canadian music industry achievements in the latter part of 2009 and in most of 2010. The awards were presented in Toronto, Ontario, Canada, during the weekend of 26 and 27 March 2011. A week of related events began on 21 March 2011. This occasion marked 40 years since the 1971 Juno Awards, the first year the ceremonies were conducted by that name.

The primary ceremony on 27 March was televised nationally by CTV. Deane Cameron, president of EMI Music Canada since 1988, was designated the 2011 recipient of the Walt Grealis Special Achievement Award. Shania Twain was inducted into the Canadian Music Hall of Fame. Neil Young was presented with the Allan Waters Humanitarian Award for his work in such causes as Farm Aid.

Drake received six nominations. Arcade Fire earned five nods. Broken Social Scene, Justin Bieber and Hedley each received four nominations. Johnny Reid and Sarah McLachlan each earned two nods. Die Mannequin and Neil Young received two nominations.

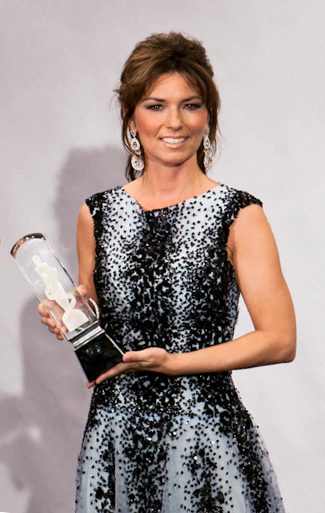
Canadian Music Hall of Fame inductee Shania Twain at the 2011 Juno Awards

== Events ==
Most awards were announced at a private gala dinner on 26 March 2011 at Exhibition Place's Allstream Centre. Rap musician and actor Drake hosted the primary awards ceremony from the Air Canada Centre the next evening.

A new trophy design was introduced for the 2011 awards, consisting of a laser engraving of Shirley Elford's Juno spiral figure encased within a transparent block. Elford had created individual trophies since the 2000 awards, but was unable to continue this work due to cancer.

Other events during the Juno week include:

- 20–25 March: various presentations and workshops at the Ontario Science Centre
- 20–26 March: various films related to Canadian musicians at TIFF Bell Lightbox
- 21 March: Juno Hoops basketball game at Kerr Hall, Ryerson University, featuring musicians, sportspeople and other personalities as players
- 22 March: Ovation classical concert at Roy Thomson Hall
- 23 March: Songwriters Circle at Massey Hall, hosted by Johnny Reid, featuring Luke Doucet, Lynn Miles, Sylvia Tyson, Royal Wood;
- 24 March: Juno Block Party at Pecaut Square, a concert in which selected Juno nominees perform;
- 25 March: Juno Cup ice hockey game between NHL veterans and musicians at CNE Coliseum
- 25–26 March: JunoFest series of concerts at multiple venues
- 26 March: Juno Fan Fare at the MuchMusic location

=== Main ceremony performers ===
The complete list of performances at the main ceremony:

- Down With Webster - "Time to Win/Your Man/Woah Is Me" medley
- Sarah McLachlan - "Loving You is Easy"
- Hedley - "Perfect"
- Tribute to Joni Mitchell, Gordon Lightfoot, Neil Young, and The Band for the Juno's 40th anniversary
  - Sarah Slean - "Carey"
  - Jim Cuddy & Sarah Harmer - "If You Could Read My Mind"
  - City and Colour - "Old Man"
  - Kevin Hearn - "The Genetic Method"
  - Greg Keelor, Derek Miller, Justin Rutledge, Serena Ryder, The Sadies - "The Shape I'm In"
- Tokyo Police Club - Bambi
- Johnny Reid - "Today I'm Gonna Try and Change the World"
- Broken Social Scene - World Sick
- Arcade Fire - "Rococo"
- Chromeo - "Hot Mess"
- Chilly Gonzales also played piano during Drake's monologue.

== Nominees and winners ==
Nominations for the various award categories were announced on 1 February 2011. Most awards were announced at the private 26 March gala, with eight categories announced the following day on the main televised ceremony.

=== People ===
==== Juno Fan Choice Award ====
Winner: Justin Bieber

Other nominees:

- Michael Bublé
- Drake
- Hedley
- Johnny Reid

==== Artist of the Year ====
Winner: Neil Young

Other nominees:

- Justin Bieber
- Drake
- Sarah McLachlan
- Johnny Reid

==== Group of the Year ====
Winner: Arcade Fire

Other nominees:

- Broken Social Scene
- Down with Webster
- Great Big Sea
- Three Days Grace

==== New Artist of the Year ====
Winner: Meaghan Smith

Other nominees:

- Bobby Bazini
- Basia Bulat
- Caribou
- Hannah Georgas

==== New Group of the Year ====
Winner: Said the Whale

Other nominees:

- Die Mannequin
- Hollerado
- Misteur Valaire
- My Darkest Days

==== Jack Richardson Producer of the Year ====
Winner: Daniel Lanois, "Hitchhiker" (Neil Young, Le Noise); "I Believe in You" (Black Dub, Black Dub)

Other nominees:

- Arcade Fire (with Markus Dravs), "Ready To Start", "We Used To Wait" (Arcade Fire, The Suburbs)
- Gavin Brown and Sarah Harmer, "Captive", "New Loneliness" (Sarah Harmer, Oh Little Fire)
- David Foster, "Bring Me To Life" (Katherine Jenkins, Believe); "Secret" (Seal, Commitment)
- Brian Howes, "Cha-Ching", "Perfect" (Hedley, The Show Must Go)

==== Recording Engineer of the Year ====
Winner: Kevin Churko, "Let It Die", "Life Won’t Wait" (Ozzy Osbourne, Scream)

Other nominees:

- Lenny De Rose, "Captive", "Late Bloomer" (Sarah Harmer, Oh Little Fire)
- Mike Plotnikoff, "What Do You Got?" (Bon Jovi, Greatest Hits: The Ultimate Collection); "Break" (Three Days Grace, Life Starts Now)
- David Travers-Smith, "Cold Outside" (Ruth Moody, The Garden); "Vinicius" (Jayme Stone, Room of Wonders)
- Jeff Wolpert, "On A Bright May Morning" (Loreena McKennitt, The Wind That Shakes the Barley); "Midnight Train to Georgia" (David Clayton-Thomas, Soul Ballads)

==== Songwriter of the Year ====
Winner: Arcade Fire, "Ready To Start", "Sprawl II (Mountains Beyond Mountains)", "We Used To Wait"; all from The Suburbs

Other nominees:

- Drake, "Fireworks" (written with M. Samuels), "Over" (written with N. Shebib, M. Samuels, C. Kalla, A.Cook), "Show Me A Good Time" (written with K. West, J. Bhasker, E. Wilson); all from Thank Me Later
- Hannah Georgas, "Chit Chat", "The Deep End" (written with Robbie Driscoll), "Lovers Breakdown"; all from This Is Good
- Sarah McLachlan, "Forgiveness" (written with Pierre Marchand), "Illusions of Bliss", "Loving You Is Easy"; all from Laws of Illusion
- Royal Wood, "On Top of Your Love", "Tonight I Will Be Your Guide", "Waiting"; all from The Waiting

=== Albums ===
==== Album of the Year ====
Winner: The Suburbs, Arcade Fire

Other nominees:

- My World 2.0, Justin Bieber
- A Place Called Love, Johnny Reid
- The Show Must Go, Hedley
- Thank Me Later, Drake

==== Aboriginal Album of the Year ====
Winner: CerAmony, CerAmony

Other nominees:

- The Black Star, Joey Stylez
- Derek Miller with Double Trouble, Derek Miller
- The Great Unknown, Eagle & Hawk
- Vigilance, Little Hawk

==== Adult Alternative Album of the Year ====
Winner: Le Noise, Neil Young

Other nominees:

- Black Dub, Black Dub
- Oh Little Fire, Sarah Harmer
- Steel City Trawler. Luke Doucet and the White Falcon
- You I Wind Land and Sea, Justin Nozuka

==== Alternative Album of the Year ====
Winner: The Suburbs, Arcade Fire

Other nominees:

- Champ, Tokyo Police Club
- Les Chemins de verre, Karkwa
- Forgiveness Rock Record, Broken Social Scene
- Heartland, Owen Pallett

==== Blues Album of the Year ====
Winner: Everywhere West, Jim Byrnes

Other nominees:

- Bread and Buddha, Harry Manx
- It's a Long Road, The Johnny Max Band
- The Sojourners, The Sojourners
- Where's the Blues Taking Me, Fathead

==== Children's Album of the Year ====
Winner: Proud Like a Mountain, Peter Lenton

Other nominees:

- Encore, Gregg LeRock
- The Little Blue Doggy, Michelle Campagne
- Number 3 (album)|Number 3, The Kerplunks
- Power to the Little People, The Monkey Bunch

==== Classical Album of the Year (solo or chamber ensemble) ====
Winner: Beethoven: Piano Trios Op. 70 No. 1, Ghost & No. 2: Op 11, Gryphon Trio

Other nominees:

- Anton Kuerti Schumann, Anton Kuerti
- Armenian Chamber Music, Amici Ensemble
- Bach: Six Suites for Solo Cello, Winona Zelenka
- Marc-André Hamelin - Études, Marc-André Hamelin

==== Classical Album of the Year (large ensemble) ====
Winner: Mozart: Scott and Lara St. John/The Knights, Scott and Lara St. John

Other nominees:

- Arvo Pärt: Portrait, Angèle Dubeau and La Pietà
- Bonbons (album)|Bonbons, Les Violons du Roy under Bernard Labadie
- Chopin Piano Concertos, Janina Fialkowska and Vancouver Symphony Orchestra under Bramwell Tovey
- James Ehnes Plays Mendelssohn, James Ehnes

==== Classical Album of the Year (vocal or choral performance) ====
Winner: Great Operatic Arias, Gerald Finley

Other nominees:

- Britten - Les Illuminations, Karina Gauvin
- Into Light, Musica intima
- Night and Dreams, Measha Brueggergosman
- Salsa baroque, Ensemble Caprice

==== Gospel Album of the Year|Contemporary Christian/Gospel Album of the Year ====
Winner: Love & the Lack Thereof, Greg Sczebel

Other nominees:

- Clarity, Article One
- The Chase, Manafest
- Newworldson, Newworldson
- The Saving One, Starfield

==== Country Album of the Year ====
Winner: A Place Called Love, Johnny Reid

Other nominees:

- Day Job, Gord Bamford
- Love Rules, Carolyn Dawn Johnson
- Sunshine, Deric Ruttan
- Trail in Life, Dean Brody

==== Electronic Album of the Year ====
Winner: Swim, Caribou

Other nominees:

- Crystal Castles II, Crystal Castles
- Ivory Tower, Chilly Gonzales
- Latin, Holy Fuck
- Running High, Poirier

==== Francophone Album of the Year ====
Winner: Les Chemins de verre, Karkwa

Other nominees:

- Belmundo Regal, Radio Radio
- Brun, Bernard Adamus
- Nous, Daniel Bélanger
- Silence, Fred Pellerin

==== Instrumental Album of the Year ====
Winner: Continent & Western, Fond of Tigers

Other nominees:

- Rising Sun, The Souljazz Orchestra
- Room of Wonders, Jayme Stone
- Spirit Dance, David Braid and Canadian Brass
- Sundogs, Creaking Tree String Quartet

==== International Album of the Year ====
Winner: Teenage Dream, Katy Perry

Other nominees:

- Animal, Ke$ha
- Need You Now, Lady Antebellum
- Recovery, Eminem
- Speak Now, Taylor Swift

==== Contemporary Jazz Album of the Year ====
Winner: Treelines, Christine Jensen Jazz Orchestra

Other nominees:

- Big Sky, Chet Doxas
- Jerusalem Trilogy, Matt Herskowitz
- Next Exit, Kelly Jefferson Quartet
- Ricochet, Adrean Farrugia

==== Traditional Jazz Album of the Year ====
Winner: Our First Set, John MacLeod's Rex Hotel Orchestra

Other nominees:

- Drum Lore, Owen Howard
- Hieronymus, Félix Stüssi 5 and Ray Anderson
- Re: Visions, Works for Jazz Orchestra, Earl MacDonald
- Songbook Vol. 2, Kirk MacDonald Quartet

==== Vocal Jazz Album of the Year ====
Winner: Nina, Kellylee Evans

Other nominees:

- The Beat Goes On, Emilie-Claire Barlow
- Last Call, Jeff Healey
- Nikki, Nikki Yanofsky
- Tracing Light, Laila Biali

==== Pop Album of the Year ====
Winner: My World 2.0, Justin Bieber

Other nominees:

- Better in Time, Bobby Bazini
- Can't Keep a Secret, Faber Drive
- Laws of Illusion, Sarah McLachlan
- Time to Win, Vol. 1, Down with Webster

==== Rap Recording of the Year ====
Winner: TSOL, Shad

Other nominees:

- At Last, Eternia and MoSS
- Thank Me Later, Drake
- Treat of the Day, Ghettosocks
- Vaudeville, D-Sisive

==== Rock Album of the Year ====
Winner: Vancouver, Matthew Good

Other nominees:

- Bears, Mayors, Scraps & Bones, Cancer Bats
- Fino + Bleed, Die Mannequin
- Life Turns Electric, Finger Eleven
- Population: Declining, Hail the Villain

==== Roots and Traditional Album of the Year (solo) ====
Winner: My Hands Are on Fire and Other Love Songs, Old Man Luedecke

Other nominees:

- The Early Widows, Justin Rutledge
- Fall For Beauty, Lynn Miles
- The Garden, Ruth Moody
- Love Songs for the Last Twenty, Del Barber

==== Roots and Traditional Album of the Year (group) ====
Winner: La part du feu, Le Vent du Nord

Other nominees:

- City City, Chic Gamine
- Girls from the North Country- Dala Live in Concert, Dala
- Sundogs, Creaking Tree String Quartet
- That's the State I'm In, The Marigolds

==== World Music Album of the Year (solo) ====
Winner: Aksil, Élage Diouf

Other nominees:

- Gakondo, Mighty Popo
- The Rumba Foundation, Jesse Cook
- Soy Panamericano, Roberto López Project
- Supermagique, Pacifika

=== Songs ===
==== Single of the Year ====
Winner: "Wavin' Flag", Young Artists for Haiti

Other nominees:

- "Find Your Love", Drake
- "Hallelujah (Vancouver Winter 2010)", k.d. lang
- "Oh...Canada", Classified
- "Perfect", Hedley

==== Classical Composition of the Year ====
Winner: "Duo For Violin And Piano", R. Murray Schafer (album, Wild Bird)

Other nominees:

- "Exaudi", Jocelyn Morlock (album, Into Light)
- "Lamentatio Jeremiae Prophetae", Peter-Anthony Togni (album, Lamentatio Jeremiae Prophetae)
- "Last Dance", Clark Ross (album, Piano Atlantica)
- "Piano Concerto, 3", Larysa Kuzmenko (album, Concerti)

==== Dance Recording of the Year ====
Winner: "Sofi Needs a Ladder", Deadmau5

Other nominees:

- Business Casual, Chromeo
- Fixin to Thrill, Dragonette
- "Stereo Love", Mia Martina and Edward Maya
- "Table Dancer", Keshia Chanté

==== R&B/Soul Recording of the Year ====
Winner: "Stars", Quanteisha

Other nominees:

- "Come True", Solitair feat. Kardinal Offishall
- Nightlife, Karl Wolf
- "So Much", Raghav with Kardinal Offishall
- "Test Drive", Keshia Chanté

==== Reggae Recording of the Year ====
Winner: "Likkle But Mi Tallawah", Elaine Lil'Bit Sheppard

Other nominees:

- Brighter Days, Lyndon John X
- "Don't Wanna Go", Tonya P
- Million Chance, Tony Anthony
- System Shakedown, Dubmatix

=== Other ===
==== Music DVD of the Year ====
Winner: Rush: Beyond the Lighted Stage (Rush), Scot McFadyen, Sam Dunn, Pegi Cecconi, Shelley Nott, Noah Segal, John Virant

Other nominees:

- The Lost Tapes (Buck 65), Nick Blasko, Geoff McLean, Christopher Mills
- Tournée Mondiale Taking Chances Le Spectacle (Celine Dion), Jean Lamoureux, Julie Snyder
- This Movie Is Broken (Broken Social Scene), Bruce McDonald, Niv Fichman, Dany M. Chiasson, Brandi-Ann Milbradt, Howard Ng, Amy Paquette, Noah Segal, Austin Wong
- The Virtual Haydn, Tom Beghin, Martha De Francisco, Jeremy Tusz, Wieslaw Woszczyk

==== Recording Package of the Year ====
Winner: Elisabeth Chicoine, Jimmy Collins, Robyn Kotyk, Joe McKay, Justin Peroff, Charles Spearin: Forgiveness Rock Record (vinyl box set), Broken Social Scene

Other nominees:

- Gabriel Jones, Vincent Morisset, Caroline Robert: The Suburbs, Arcade Fire
- James Mejia: Mutant Message, By Divine Right
- Graeme Patterson: New Inheritors, Wintersleep
- Corri-Lynn Tetz: Cloak and Cipher, Land of Talk

==== Video of the Year ====
Winner: "Kyle Davison, Perfect", Hedley

Other nominees:

- "Chargez!", Ariel
- "Collect Call", Metric
- "Forced to Love", Broken Social Scene
- "Saint Veronika", Billy Talent

== Compilation album ==
A compilation album featuring selected Juno nominees was released on 8 March 2011 by EMI Music Canada. Sales of the album support the CARAS music education charity MusiCounts. The artists and track listing is as follows:

1. "Ready To Start", Arcade Fire
2. "All To All", Broken Social Scene
3. "Find Your Love", Drake
4. "Baby", Justin Bieber with Ludacris
5. "Hollywood", Michael Bublé
6. "Perfect", Hedley
7. "Oh...Canada", Classified
8. "The Good Life", Three Days Grace
9. "Your Man", Down with Webster
10. "Porn Star Dancing" (rock version), My Darkest Days with Zakk Wylde
11. "Camilo (The Magician)", Said the Whale
12. "Take Back The Fear", Hail the Villain
13. "Nothing But A Song", Great Big Sea
14. "Let's Go Higher", Johnny Reid
15. "Loving You Is Easy", Sarah McLachlan
16. "Walk With Me", Neil Young
17. "I Wonder", Bobby Bazini
18. "Hallelujah" (new version), k.d. lang
19. "Wavin' Flag", Young Artists For Haiti

== See also ==
- Juno Awards of 2000, the most recent previous time the awards were held in Toronto
