= Down with Webster =

Canadian rap rock band

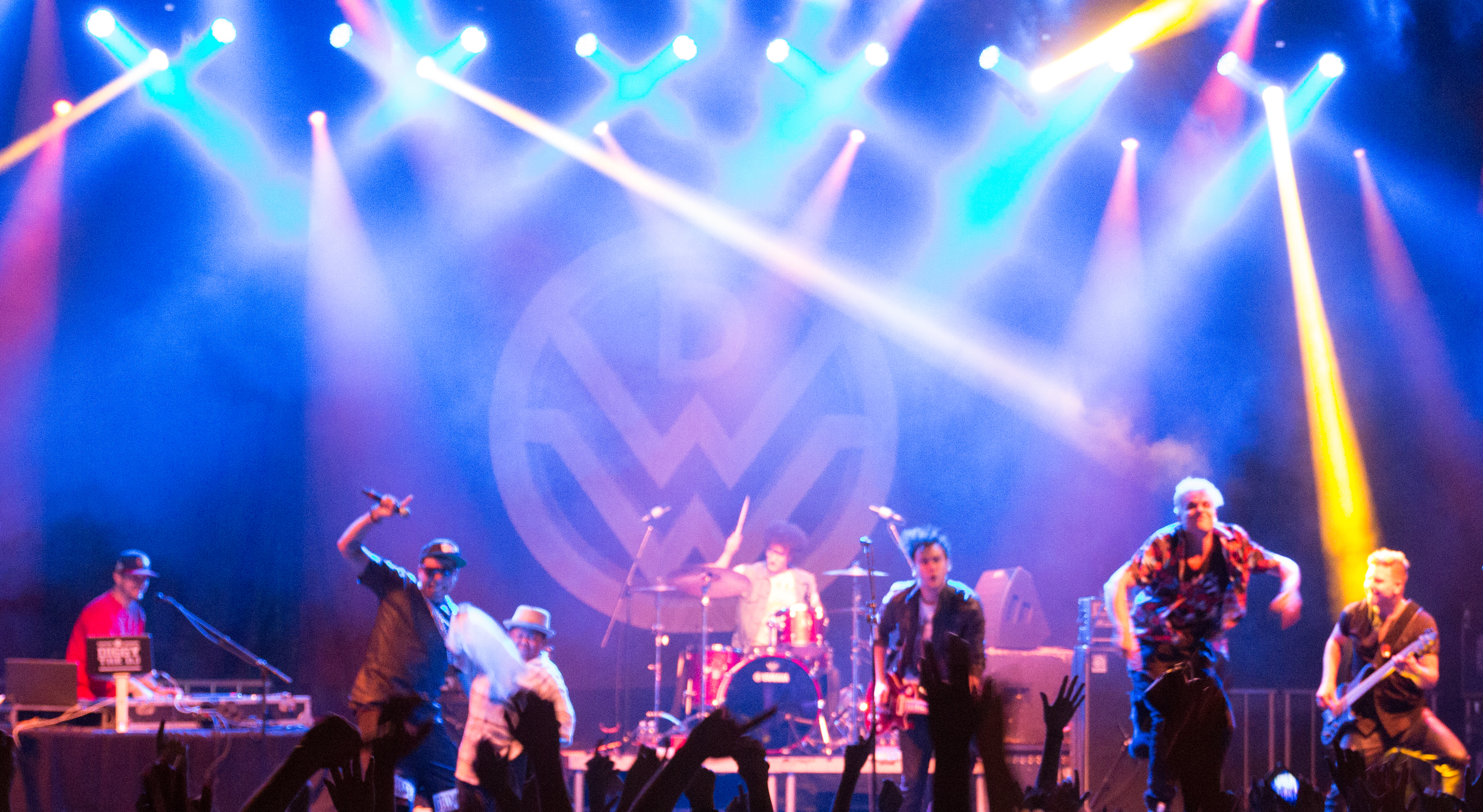
- Down with Webster on stage with Emmanuel Lewis (Webster) at the Festival of Friends in 2014

Background information
- Origin: Toronto, Ontario, Canada
- Genres: Pop rock; rap rock; hip hop
- Years active: 1998–2015; 2020–2021; 2024–present
- Label: Universal Motown/Universal Music
- Members: Tyler Armes; Patrick Gillett; Cameron Hunter; Andrew "Marty" Martino; Martin "Bucky" Seja
- Past members: Kyle "Kap" Fairlie; Dave "D!ggy" Ferris; Matt Campitelli; Mitchell Wong; Kierscey Regozo (Note: Also known as Kierscey Rand)
- Website: downwithwebster.com

Down with Webster is a Canadian rap rock band from The Beaches area of Toronto who signed with Universal Motown in April 2009. The band first achieved commercial success with the release of the 2009 EP, Time to Win, Vol. I which consisted of the singles "Rich Girl$", "Your Man" and "Whoa Is Me". Their major-label debut album, Time to Win, Vol. II (2011) featured the track "She's Dope". The 2014 follow-up album Party for Your Life included the songs "One in a Million" and "Chills." The band has been nominated for Juno Awards, MuchMusic Video Awards and Canadian Radio Music Awards.

== History ==
=== 1998–2007: Career beginnings ===
Down with Webster originally started as an instrumental jazz band that was formed in a music class at Glen Ames Senior Public School in 1998 by band members Patrick Gillett and Tyler Armes. They, along with the original members of the band, quickly named the group toward the end of class after the beloved titular character from the 80s sitcom Webster, who is played by Emmanuel Lewis. Following a victory at their school's "Battle of the Bands" competition, the group was joined by Andrew Martino and Martin "Bucky" Seja, students from Cardinal Carter Academy for the Arts, and other members who attended Malvern Collegiate Institute. As a jam band, they made reggae, funk and jazz inspired music in Armes' father garage. Hip-hop elements were incorporated into their music once Seja became a part of the group and rapped along with Gillett, who also brought an influence of blues rock to the band.

The band released a six-track CD-R EP titled The Reverb Session July '03. This release was primarily sold at concerts in 2003 and 2004. Hype man Kyle "Kap" Fairlie, a former actor whose voice work includes roles in the Nelvana series Redwall, Franklin, Babar and Rolie Polie Olie, and the film The Little Bear Movie, and rapper Cameron "Cam" Hunter would later join the band's lineup. In 2007, the band released their debut independent self-titled album.

=== 2008–2012: Time to Win, Vol. I & II ===
As long as any of us can remember, all we wanted to do was make music. While we came from different backgrounds, found inspiration from different influences, and developed different styles; we were united by our love of music. It's the reason we saved all of our money to buy albums, memorized every word, learned each chord, bass line and beat. It's the reason we spent all of our time together writing, playing and producing in a garage. It's the reason we sleep in the studio and live on stage… Every show is a party and we dare the audience to have more fun than us (usually it's a tie).

–Down with Webster (2009)

The group built a following through their energetic shows. Jill Langlois of Chart recounted their performance at Canadian Music Week in March 2008: "...the band exploded onto the stage and never slowed down or stopped. Words will never really describe the Down With Webster experience." She described them as "flashy and obnoxious, but fun and loveable". In June, the group was named 'Best Unsigned Artist in Canada' by Rogers Mobile and received a recording prize worth $25,000. After facing years of rejection, they captured the attention of music executives including musicians Gene Simmons and Timbaland, who wanted to sign the band to their respective record labels. The former had aspirations for them to appear in a reality series to grow their audience as well. According to Timbaland, "That group is the most amazing and creative, innovative group that's going to come out in 2010." Ultimately, they signed with Universal/Motown. The band's debut gold-certified EP Time to Win, Vol. I was released on October 6, 2009. The lead single from the EP "Rich Girl$", which sampled the Hall & Oates track of the same name, peaked at No. 21 on the Canadian Hot 100. In the fall of 2009, they opened for Forever the Sickest Kids on the Cheap Date Tour.

The follow-up single "Your Man" peaked at No. 12 on the Hot 100, and was certified double platinum in digital downloads by the CRIA. The first headlining tour, WINTOUR I, had the band tour Canada and the United States in January and February 2010. The tour started in Halifax on January 7 and ended on February 1 in Vancouver. The band also opened for Timbaland on two dates in February on the Shock Value II Tour. They were nominated for 'New Group of the Year' at the 2010 Juno Awards, losing to Arkells. Additionally, they received nominations for 'UR Fave: New Artist' and 'Pop Video of the Year'. at the 2010 MuchMusic Video Awards. The third single "Whoa Is Me", was released on June 15, 2010, and peaked at No. 13 on the Canadian Hot 100. Over the summer, they played at festivals such as the SCENE Music Festival, the Ottawa Bluesfest and the Sarnia Bayfest, where they opened for the Black Eyed Peas. After finishing the Streets of Gold Tour with 3OH!3, the band would "lock ourselves in the studio for a couple of months" and finish their forthcoming album. The tour was completed on November 24, 2010, at Albuquerque, New Mexico. They then performed at the pregame show for the 98th Grey Cup. In December, they won the 'Online Artist of the Year' at the 2010 Canadian New Media Awards.

WINtour II, a cross-Canada tour that supported their upcoming album began on February 22, 2011, in Lethbridge, Alberta and ended on March 12 in Toronto. They were nominated for two awards at the Juno Awards of 2011, Group of the Year and Pop Album of the Year. The band also performed at the awards ceremony on March 27. They received four nominations at 2011 MuchMusic Video Awards, winning one for Pop Video of the Year for "Whoa Is Me". On May 12, 2011, it was announced that hype man Kyle "Kap" Fairlie was no longer in the band, citing their reason as "6 guys going in one musical direction that didn't quite fit with the 7th." The group played at summer festivals and exhibitions including the Red River Exhibition and Capital Ex, where Armes' former band the Midway State was their supporting act. The first single from their upcoming album, "She's Dope", was released on May 23, 2011. It peaked at No. 18 on the Hot 100. "Big Wheels" was released as the album's second single on September 9, 2011, and peaked at No. 51 on the Hot 100. Time to Win, Vol. II was released on October 31, 2011, and reached No. 9 on the Canadian Albums Chart. On December 20, 2011, the band released their iTunes Session EP that included live versions of songs from the album. In 2012, they embarked on the third edition of their WINtour. "Royalty" and "Jessica" became the final singles from the album. The band made a cameo appearance in the Canadian comedic film The Movie Out Here later that year.

=== 2013–2015: Party for Your Life ===
On March 20, 2013, the band released the single "One in a Million". They continued opening for Marianas Trench on the second leg of the Face The Music Tour in Canada after opening for them in the fall of 2012. On August 13, 2013, the band released the song "Party for Your Life". It was later revealed that Party for Your Life is also the name of the upcoming album, originally scheduled for release on October 22, 2013. The album was later pushed back to January 28, 2014, to include newer material in the album. It peaked at No. 2 on the Canadian Albums Chart and was nominated for Pop Album of the Year at the Juno Awards. Their version of "Saturday Night" was played during the NHL's 2013–14 season on Hockey Night in Canada. "Chills" was released on December 17, 2013, becoming the band's fourth single to reach the top 20 of the Canadian Hot 100 and spending 34 weeks on the chart—longer than any song they released previously. On February 9, 2014, an alternate version of "Feel So Alive" was played during the CBC Olympic broadcasts of the 2014 Winter Olympics. The band toured from 2014, starting the fourth and final installment of their WINtour series across Canada, to opening slots in 2015 in the US. Their DJ Dave "Diggy" Ferris decided to stop touring with the group in 2014 after his girlfriend became pregnant with their first child. In the US, they joined the tours of Hoodie Allen, Timeflies and Jonny Craig.

=== 2016–present: Other projects, V and reunion ===
In 2016, Armes released two songs that he had made with Gillett under the name Best Night Ever. Proceeds from the singles supported Kids Help Phone and The Trevor Project. Seja started a new project called Karter Park with original band member, Kierscey.

Gillett opened up about his struggles with mental health and created music with Armes, Martino and Hunter while maintaining his sobriety which later became a part of an album, released under the band name Honors, titled Feel Better (2018).

During the summer of 2020, the group released the songs, "Love Is Not Enough" and "Take Us Alive" from an album called V which was recorded back in 2015. Armes shared that V is their final album after its surprise release in February 2021.

The band members remain active in the music industry. Seja and Hunter signed a publishing deal as songwriters. Hunter has also continued to release solo albums. Martino worked on Hunter's music as well as the soundtracks for the My Little Pony web series Tell Your Tale and television special Bridlewoodstock. Armes produced the scores for the CBC series, Anyone's Game and Run the Burbs. Gillett releases music independently. Ferris is a real estate agent that djs on occasion.

On April 1, 2024, Down with Webster returned and announced via social media that the band will be having a reunion tour in the summer with tour dates coming soon. The group played a handful of festivals in the summer including the Calgary Stampede on July 9, Ottawa Bluesfest on July 14, the Super-Spike Volleyball tournament on July 19 and 20, and the Peterborough Musicfest on August 1. The group performed on a holiday WinTOUR tour in December 2024 and in Hamilton in July 2025.

The band played live at the Liberal Party's victory night celebration after the April 2025 election. The group released their first single in five years titled, "Okae" on July 30, 2025, and performed at the Boots and Hearts country music festival in Oro-Medonte. On November 27, 2025, the band released another single titled "All Night". The song debuted at number 39 on the Canada CHR/Top 40 airplay chart.

== Members ==
=== Current members ===
- Cameron Hunter — rap vocals, vocals
- Martin "Bucky" Seja – rap vocals, vocals
- Patrick Gillett – guitar, rap vocals, lead vocals
- Tyler Armes – bass guitar, keyboards
- Andrew "Marty" Martino – drums

=== Past members ===
- Kyle "Kap" Fairlie – backing vocals
- Dave "Diggy" Ferris — turntables
- Kierscey Regozo – keyboards
- Matt Campitelli – guitar
- Mitchell Wong – saxophone

== Influences ==
Their influences range across many genres including pop, rock, hip-hop, jazz and electronic music. Armes has cited Michael Jackson; electronic artists Justice and Skrillex; and jazz fusion musicians Stanley Clarke and Jaco Pastorious as inspirations, while Gillett and Hunter has credited hip-hop groups Beastie Boys, Wu-Tang Clan and Cypress Hill; and rock bands Aerosmith, Rage Against the Machine and Led Zeppelin for helping the band shape their blend of music.

== Discography ==
- 2007: Down with Webster
- 2009: Time to Win, Vol. I
- 2011: Time to Win, Vol. II
- 2014: Party for Your Life
- 2021: V

== Awards and nominations ==
Down With Webster has been nominated for 22 awards including 12 MuchMusic Video Awards and 6 Juno Awards.

Awards and nominations received by Down With Webster
Award	Year (Note: Indicates the year of ceremony. Each year is linked to the article about the awards held that year, wherever possible.)	Nominee/work	Category	Result	Ref.
Canadian New Media Awards	2010	Down with Webster	Online Artist of the Year	Won	
Canadian Radio Music Awards	2011	Rich Girl$"	CHR Song of the Year	Won	
Canadian Radio Music Awards	2011	"Your Man"	Song of the Year	Nominated	
Canadian Radio Music Awards	2014	Down with Webster	Heatseeker	Won	
Juno Awards	2010	Down with Webster	New Group of the Year	Nominated	
Juno Awards	2011	Down with Webster	Group of the Year	Nominated	
Juno Awards	2011	Time to Win, Vol. I	Pop Album of the Year	Nominated	
Juno Awards	2012	Down with Webster	Group of the Year	Nominated	
Juno Awards	2012	Time to Win, Vol. II	Pop Album of the Year	Nominated	
Juno Awards	2015	Party for Your Life	Pop Album of the Year	Nominated	
MuchMusic Video Awards	2010	"Your Man"	Pop Video of the Year	Nominated	
MuchMusic Video Awards	2010	Down with Webster	UR Fave: New Artist	Nominated	
MuchMusic Video Awards	2011	"Whoa Is Me"	Video of the Year	Nominated	
MuchMusic Video Awards	2011	"Whoa Is Me"	Pop Video of the Year	Won	
MuchMusic Video Awards	2011	"Whoa Is Me"	UR Fave: Video	Nominated	
MuchMusic Video Awards	2011	Down with Webster	UR Fave: Artist	Nominated	
MuchMusic Video Awards	2012	"She's Dope"	Video of the Year	Nominated	
MuchMusic Video Awards	2012	"She's Dope"	MuchFact Indie Video of the Year	Nominated	
MuchMusic Video Awards	2012	"Royalty"	Director of The Year	Nominated	
MuchMusic Video Awards	2012	"Big Wheels"	Post Production of the Year	Won	
MuchMusic Video Awards	2013	"One in a Million"	Pop Video of the Year	Nominated	
MuchMusic Video Awards	2014	"Chills"	Pop Video of the Year	Nominated	
SOCAN Awards	2015	"Chills"	Pop/Rock Music Award	Won	
