= Peterborough Musicfest =

Non-profit event organization in Ontario, Canada

Coordinates: 44°17′43″N 78°19′06″W

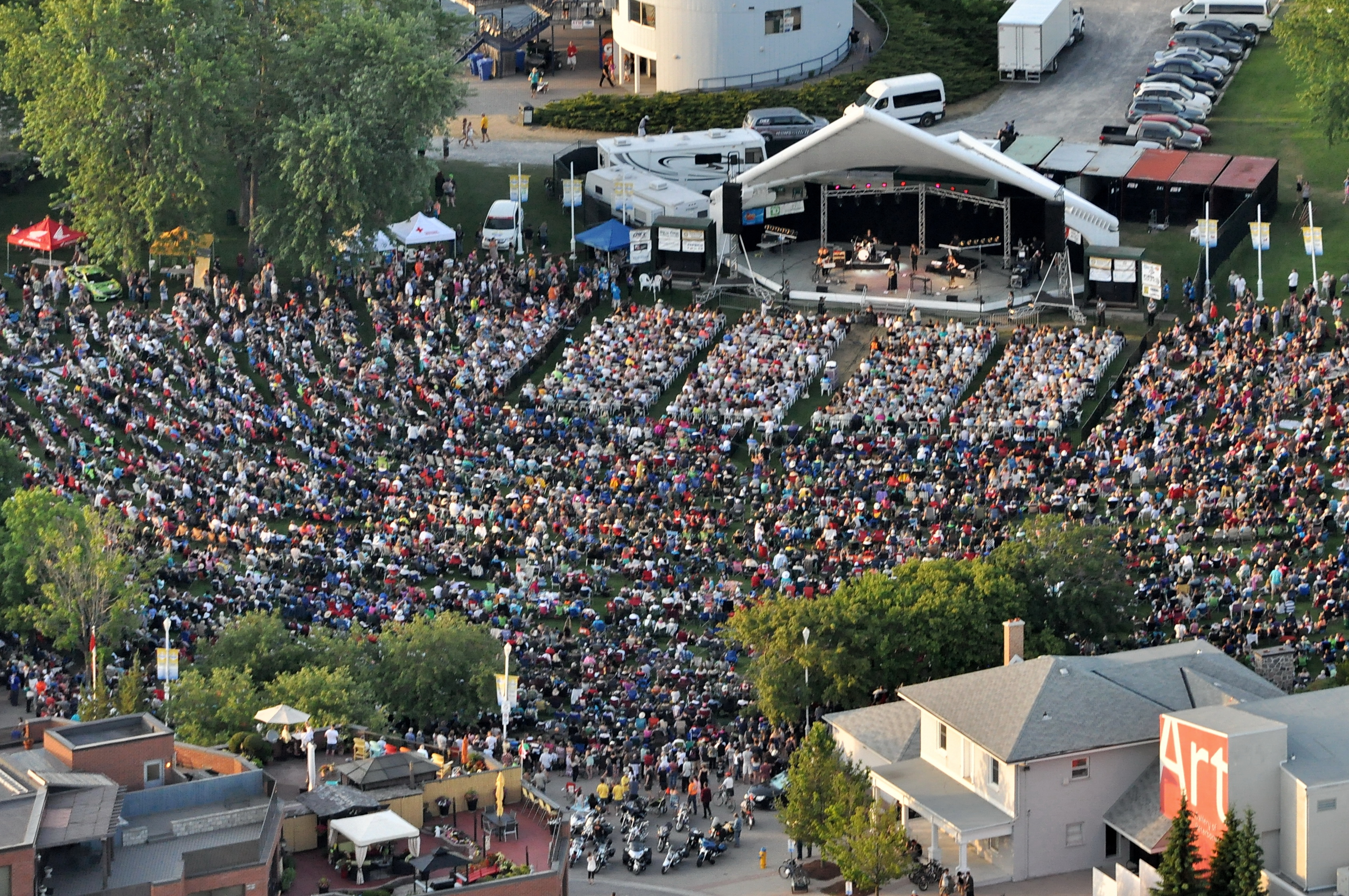
Approximately 16,000 people in attendance for Serena Ryder, who opened Peterborough Musicfest's 30th Anniversary Season on June 25, 2016.

The Peterborough Summer Festival of Lights, later renamed Peterborough Musicfest, is a non-profit, charitable organization in Peterborough, Ontario, which hosts a series of free outdoor concerts. In 2015, Peterborough Musicfest was recognized as a Top 100 Festival and Event in the province. The concerts are held at Del Crary Park, located in the downtown on George Street, adjacent to Little Lake.

== History ==
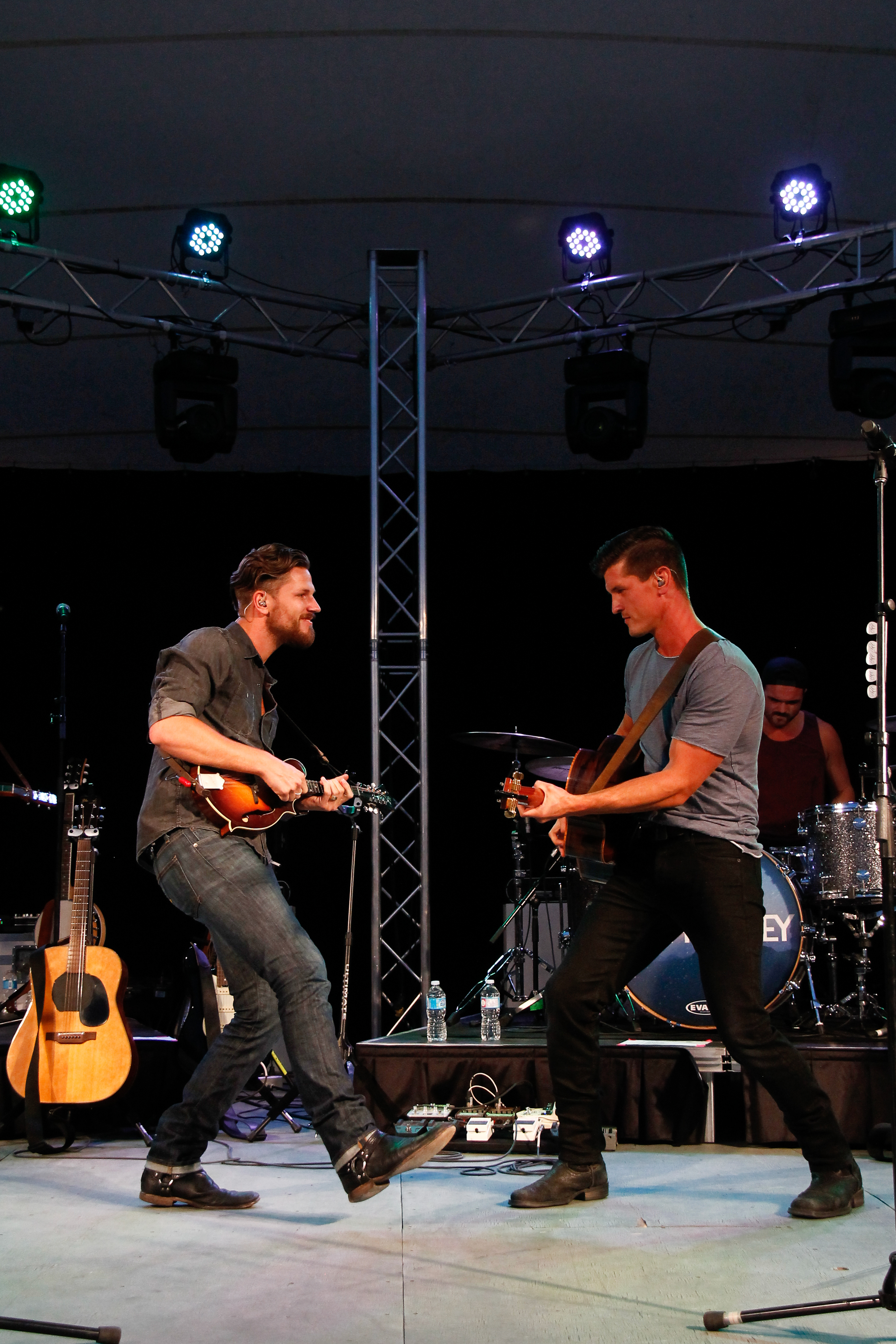
Canadian country music duo, High Valley, closed Peterborough Musicfest's 30th Anniversary season on August 24, 2016.

Founded in 1986 by Fred Anderson, these concerts were followed by a choreographed illuminated boat show and a fireworks display.

Beginning in 2005, the festival chose to forgo the aging boat show in favour of hiring more performers and improving the fireworks display. Then in 2009, the fireworks were sacrificed due to budget cuts. As a result, the festival was rebranded as "Peterborough Musicfest" .

In 2023, the music festival attracted 110,000 people and generated $4.3 million for the region.

== Past performers ==
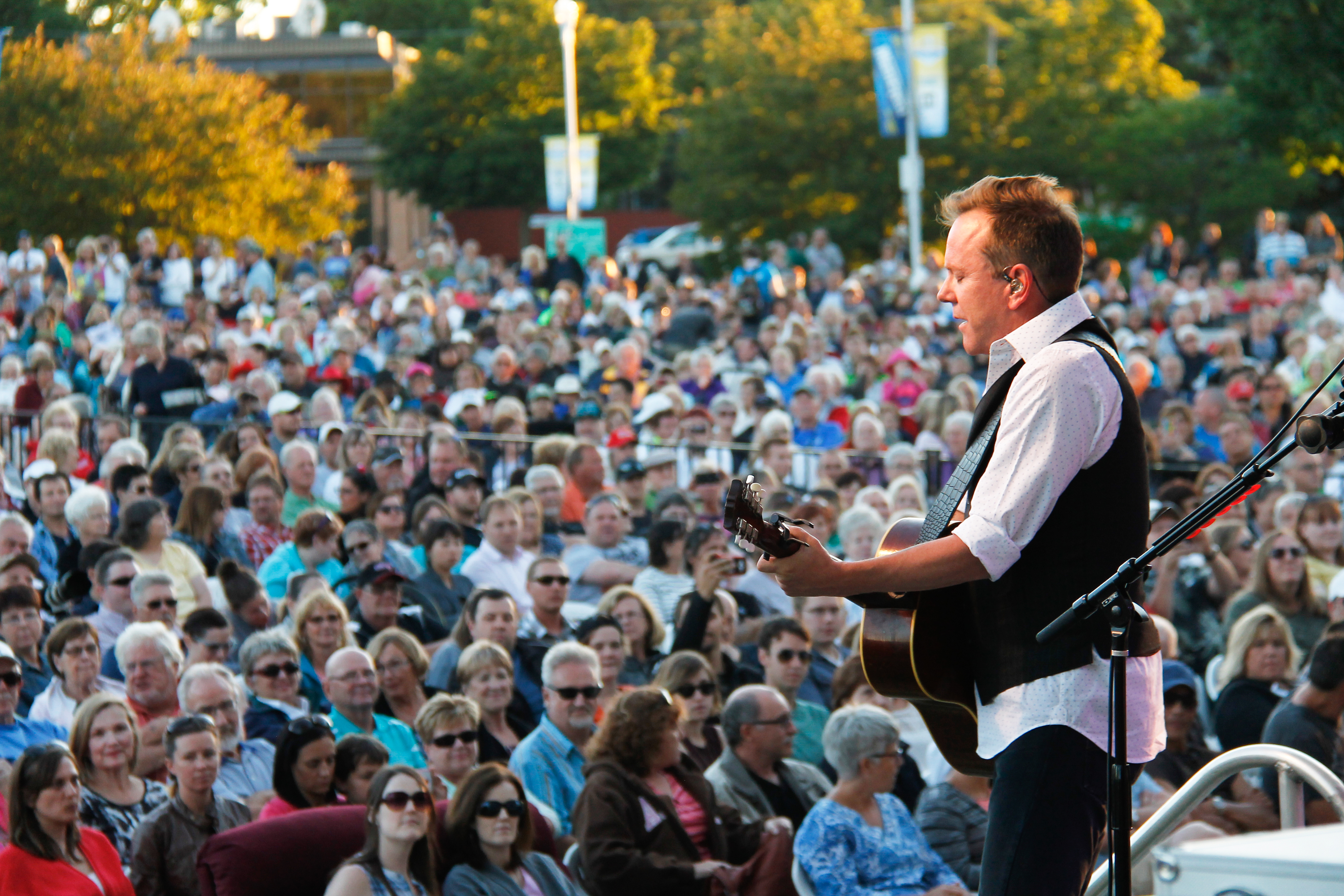
The Kiefer Sutherland Band performed at Peterborough Musicfest on June 29, 2016.

- Serena Ryder
- Kiefer Sutherland
- I Mother Earth
- Gowan
- Hey Rosetta!
- The Box
- The Spoons
- Platinum Blonde
- High Valley
- Buffy Sainte-Marie
- Tegan and Sara
- Tebey
- Sloan
- Hanson
- Colin James
- 54 40
- Carly Rae Jepsen
- Monkeyjunk
- The Proclaimers
- Tom Cochrane & Red Rider
- April Wine
- I Mother Earth
- Kalan Porter
- Gordon Lightfoot
- Natalie MacMaster
- Arrogant Worms
- Lighthouse (band)
- Cowboy Junkies
- Beatlemania
- Blue Rodeo
- Wide Mouth Mason
- Emerson Drive
- John McDermott
- The Trews
- Davy Jones
- Thousand Foot Krutch
- The Stampeders
- The Spades
- Tommy Hunter
- Leahy
- Glass Tiger
- Sweet
- Lights
- Our Lady Peace
- Mad Pasties
- See Spot Run
- The Reklaws
- Down With Webster
- Lindsay Ell
- Tim & The Glory Boys
