= CerAmony =

Canadian Cree musical duo

Background information
- Origin: Canada
- Years active: 2002 – present
- Members: Matthew Iserhoff; Pakesso Mukash

CerAmony is Canadian duo musical band of Cree origin from Whapmagoostui of Canada's James Bay area. The duo consists of Matthew Iserhoff (as lead vocals) and Pakesso Mukash (guitar and vocals). The band sings in English and Cree.

== Career ==
CerAmony's debut was in 2002 with the local (James Bay) release of First Son, a song that was inspired by the trials of La Paix Des Braves. In 2003, they appeared in CBC's "True North Concert" and debuted the song to the public in Ouje Bougoumou. CerAmony also performed at the Canadian Aboriginal Music Awards, in 2003 and 2004. The documentary film determiNATION by Paul M. Rickard and Michelle Smith, featured them in the film with other First Nation acts like Samian, Cheri and Maracle.

The debut single was "First Son", which included the B-Side "Faceless" (which was never performed in public), followed by the successful "The Last Great Men". The debut album CerAmony was released on 13 April 2010.

In the last year, CerAmony has won the Juno for Aboriginal Album of the Year, the Canadian Aboriginal Music Award for Best Songwriters, the Teweikan Radio's Choice Award, and most recently, gained four nominations for Songwriter of the Year for "The Last Great Men", Best Duo or Group, Best New Artist, and Best Producer/Engineer at the Aboriginal Peoples Choice Awards.

Recently, CerAmony signed a distribution deal with Universal World.

== Name ==
The band's name, CerAmony is written with a capital A denoting the shape of a sacred ceremonial tent. The idea came to Pakesso upon waking up from a dream one day. Both Mukash and Iserhoff agreed that it was a perfect name in the universal aspect that every race, religion and creed have ceremonies. The logo was designed by Natasia Mukash (Pakesso's sister and Matthew's wife).

== Awards ==
- Won award for Best Song Writer(s) at Canadian Aboriginal Music Awards
- On March 27, 2011, the band won "Aboriginal Album of the Year" at the Juno Awards for their self-titled album CerAmony.
- Won the Teweikan Radio's Choice Award in 2011.
- Nominated at the Canadian Aboriginal Peoples Choice Award for Songwriter of the Year for Last Great Men, Best Duo or Group, Best New Artist, and Best Producer/Engineer.

== Discography ==
- CerAmony (released 13 April 2010)
  - Track list:
  1. First Son (4:12)
  2. Looks Like Change (To Me) (3:09)
  3. Kingdom Come (5:05)
  4. Shine Alive (4:30)
  5. Live Again (4:14)
  6. Round N`Round (2:52)
  7. Reaction (4:28)
  8. Ghost (4:57)
  9. You Belong (Down Here With Us) (5:43)
  10. Our Guns (2:50)
  11. Bad Idea (3:44)
  12. The Last Great Men (4:23)
  13. Horizon (bonus track)
