= UR Fave: New Artist (MMVA Award) =

Music video award

The award, UR Fave: New Artist, was an award presented at the MuchMusic Video Awards. In the 2011 MuchMusic Video Awards the award was changed to "UR Fave: Artist". The award can only be presented to an artist or group that originates from Canada. The results are decided by an online poll. The award was first handed out at the 2009 MuchMusic Video Awards.

== Winners ==
Year	Artist	Video
2009	The Midway State	"Never Again"
2010	Justin Bieber f. Ludacris	"Baby"
2011	Justin Bieber f. Usher	"Somebody to Love (Remix)"
