= Rich Girls (song) =

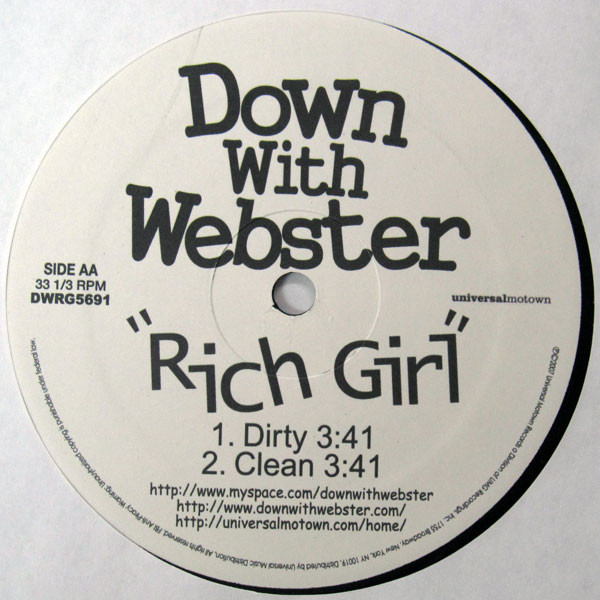

Single by Down with Webster

from the album Time to Win, Vol. 1
- Released: October 6, 2009
- Genre: Pop; Hip hop
- Length: 3:41
- Label: Universal Motown / Universal Music
- Songwriters: Tyler Armes; Patrick Gillett; Cameron Hunter; Andrew Martino; Martin Seja; Daryl Hall

Down with Webster singles chronology
"Miracle Mile" (2007)	"Rich Girls" (2009)	"Your Man" (2010)

Music video
- "Rich Girls" on YouTube

"Rich Girls" (stylised as "Rich Girl$") is a song by Canadian pop rock group Down with Webster. It was released on October 6, 2009, as the lead single from the band's 2009 EP, Time to Win, Vol. 1. The song found commercial success in Canada, peaking at number 21 on the Canadian Hot 100 and became their breakthrough single.

== Background ==
The song borrows many elements from the original version by Hall & Oates which was a #1 hit on the Billboard Hot 100. Although the song is not a full cover, the song samples the chorus and also lifts the melody and some lyrics. In an interview Andrew "Marty" Martino, the drummer for Down with Webster, said that Hall and Oates gave the song a "thumbs up".

== Music video ==
The music video was shot in Los Angeles in November 2009, and was directed by Josh Forbes. It debuted on MuchMusic Countdown at #30 in the week of December 10, 2009. The video reached #1 on the Countdown for the week of April 1, 2010. The music video premiered via VEVO on January 12, 2010.

== Chart performance ==
"Rich Girl$" debuted on the Canadian Hot 100 at number 47 on the week of October 24, 2009. The song peaked at number 21 on the week of January 9, 2010 and spent a total of 20 weeks on the chart. The song also debuted at number 78 on the US Hot 100 Airplay and peaked at number 76. The song spent a total of 5 weeks on the Hot 100 Airplay chart. The song was serviced to contemporary hit radio in the United States on October 6, 2009. It received airplay on over 60 US Top 40 stations and reached the top 50 on Billboard's Radio Songs chart. The song also became the No. 1 most added song on Top 40 radio in Canada.

In April 2010, the song was certified Platinum by the Music Canada in digital downloads.

== Awards and nominations ==
Awards and nominations for "Rich Girl$"
Year	Organization	Award	Result	Ref(s)
2011	Canadian Radio Music Awards	CHR Song of the Year	Won	

== Usage in media ==
"Rich Girl$" was featured on the compilation album of the Juno Awards of 2010. It was also covered by the group Playback early on during the second season of The X Factor.

== Track listing ==
12" vinyl
No.	Title	Length
1.	"Rich Girl$" (dirty)	3:41
2.	"Rich Girl$" (clean)	3:41

== Charts ==
Chart performance for "Rich Girl$"
Chart (2009–10)	Peak position
Canada (Canadian Hot 100)	21
Canada CHR/Top 40 (Billboard)	13
Canada Hot AC (Billboard)	41
US Radio Songs (Billboard)	76

== Certifications ==
Certification and sales for "Rich Girl$"
Region	Certification	Certified units/sales
Canada (Music Canada)	Platinum	40,000^{*}
^{*} Sales figures based on certification alone.

== Release history ==
Release dates and formats for "Rich Girl$"
Region	Date	Format	Label	Ref.
United States	October 6, 2009	Contemporary hit radio	Universal Motown / Universal Music	
