= She's Dope (Down with Webster song) =

Single by Down with Webster

from the album Time to Win, Vol. 2
- Released: May 23, 2011
- Genre: Pop rock; rap rock
- Length: 4:10
- Label: Universal Motown
- Songwriters: Tyler Armes, Cameron Hunter, Patrick Gillett, Martin Seja and Andrew Martino.

Down with Webster singles chronology
"Whoa Is Me" (2010)	"She's Dope" (2011)	"Big Wheels" (2011)

Music video
- "She's Dope" on YouTube

"She's Dope" is a song by Canadian band Down with Webster. It was released in May 2011 as the first single from their album, Time to Win, Vol. 2. The song debuted on the Canadian Hot 100 at number 52 and peaked at number 18.

== Background ==
A previous version of "She's Dope" was released in October 2010 in a 360-degrees music video in the Doritos Late Night interactive global music event via the Doritos Late Night website. The website also featured 360-degrees music videos for six other artists including Rihanna and Professor Green.

"She's Dope" was written by band members Tyler Armes, Cameron Hunter, Patrick Gillett, Martin Seja and Andrew Martino.

== Music video ==
A music video for "She's Dope" was filmed in April 2011 and was directed by Aaron A. This is the third collaboration between Down with Webster and Aaron A, after he directed the videos for "Your Man" and "Whoa Is Me". Aaron A talked about the concept of the video saying, "the concept is kind of all around this dream world and one particular dope girl." Canadian fashion model, Genevieve Pantano, is featured as the omnipresent girl. MuchMusic's show, New.Music.Live commented on the video, saying that the band combines "elements of a performance video with some trippy dream sequence sets and fish eye lenses." The music video premiered on the show on May 17, 2011. The music video for "She's Dope" debuted at #30 on the MuchMusic Countdown on the week of May 26, 2011. It peaked at number 1 on the week of August 11, 2011.

The video was nominated for 'Video of the Year' and 'MuchFact Indie Video of the Year' at the 2012 MuchMusic Video Awards.

== Chart performance ==
"She's Dope" debuted on the Canadian Hot 100 at number 52 on the week of June 11, 2011, and peaked at number 18 on the week of July 9, 2011. The song has spent a total of 11 weeks on the Canadian Hot 100. The song was the Greatest Gainer on the week July 9, 2011. "She's Dope" also peaked at #10 on the Digital Singles chart on the week of June 29, 2011.

== Live performances ==
"She's Dope" was performed live by Down with Webster at the 2011 MuchMusic Video Awards on June 19, 2011.

== Track listing ==
Digital download
No.	Title	Length
1.	"She's Dope"	4:10

== Charts and certifications ==
=== Weekly charts ===
Chart (2011)	Peak position
Canada (Canadian Hot 100)	18
Canada CHR/Pop Top 40 (Billboard)	13
Canada Hot AC (Billboard)	40

=== Year-end charts ===
Chart (2011)	Position
Canada (Canadian Hot 100)	100

=== Certifications ===
Region	Certification	Certified units/sales
Canada (Music Canada)	Platinum	80,000^{*}
^{*} Sales figures based on certification alone.
