= MuchMusic Video Award for Best Pop Video =

The following is a list of the MuchMusic Video Awards winners for Best Pop Video. The award for "Best Pop Video" was not distributed at the 2008 MuchMusic Video Awards, but was distributed again in 2009.

Year	Artist	Video
1999	Len	"Steal My Sunshine"
2000	The Moffatts	"Misery"
2001	Snow	"The Plumb Song"
2002	David Usher	"Black Black Heart"
2003	Shawn Desman	"Get Ready"
2004	Nelly Furtado	"Powerless (Say What You Want)"
2005	k-os	"Crabbuckit"
2006	Massari	"Be Easy"
2007	Hedley	"Gunnin'"
2009	Danny Fernandes	"Private Dancer"
2010	Hedley	"Cha-Ching"
2011	Down With Webster	"Whoa Is Me"
2012	Marianas Trench	"Haven't Had Enough"
