= Royalty (Down with Webster song) =

Single by Down with Webster

from the album Time to Win, Vol. II
- Released: January 10, 2012
- Genre: Rap rock
- Length: 4:21
- Label: Universal Music Canada
- Songwriters: Tyler Armes; Patrick Gillet; Cameron Hunter; Andrew Martino; Martin Seja
- Producers: Zale Epstien; Brett Ryan Kruger

Down with Webster singles chronology
"Big Wheels" (2011)	"Royalty" (2012)	"Jessica" (2012)

Music video
- "Royalty" on YouTube

"Royalty" is a song by Canadian band, Down with Webster. The song was released as the third single from the band's second studio album Time to Win, Vol. II on January 10, 2012. The song peaked at #75 on the Canadian Hot 100.

== Background ==
The song was written by Down with Webster band members Tyler Armes, Patrick Gillet, Cameron Hunter, Andrew Martino and Martin Seja. "Royalty" was produced by Down with Webster, Zale Epstein and Brett Ryan Kruger. Allison of MuchMusic said that the lyrics of "Royalty" are "about a girl who parties too hard."

The beginning of the song uses a sample from the track "I'd Like" by the musical act Freshlyground. The looped sample in the background is from New Zealand band Mt Eden (or Mt Eden Dubstep) entitled Sierra Leone.

== Music video ==
Down with Webster in the "Royalty" music video

A music video for the song was filmed in Toronto over two days starting on January 8, 2012. The music video was directed by Chris Wong. In MuchMusic's series On Set, Wong shared that he took inspiration from the music videos of Jay Z's "On to the Next One", Rihanna's "We Found Love" and Drake's "Marvin's Room."

The video premiered on February 2, 2012, on Much Music and Billboard.com. Allison of Much Music said that band "lights up the screen both figuratively with their dark party track and literally with instruments set ablaze" in the music video. Wong received recognition at the 2012 MuchMusic Video Awards, earning a nomination for "Director of the Year". It was the ninth most watched music video on MuchMusic in 2012.

== Chart performance ==
"Royalty" debuted on the Canadian Hot 100 at #98 on the week of February 18, 2012 and climbed up to #75 on the week of February 25, 2012.

== Charts ==
Chart performance for "Royalty"
Chart (2012)	Peak position
Canada (Canadian Hot 100)	75
