= Your Man (Down with Webster song) =

Single by Down with Webster

from the album Time to Win, Vol. 1
- Released: January 20, 2010 (CAN); April 27, 2010 (US)
- Recorded: 2009
- Genre: Pop rock
- Length: 2:49
- Label: Universal Motown / Universal Music
- Songwriters: Ronald Dunbar and Edyth Wayne; Patrick Gillet; Tyler Armes; Cameron Hunter; Andrew Martino; Martin Seja
- Producers: Demacio "Demo" Castellon; Down with Webster; James Robertson

Down with Webster singles chronology
"Rich Girl$" (2009)	"Your Man" (2010)	"Whoa Is Me" (2010)

Music video
- "Your Man" (720p) on Vimeo

"Your Man" is a song by Canadian group Down with Webster. It was the second single released from the band's 2009 EP, Time to Win, Vol. I. The song was very successful in Canada, peaking at number 12 on the Canadian Hot 100. In April 2010, the song was certified Platinum by the CRIA in digital downloads. The song contains a sample of "Girls It Ain't Easy" by Honey Cone.

== Composition ==
"Your Man" was written by Down with Webster members Patrick Gillet, Tyler Armes, Cameron Hunter, Andrew Martino and Martin Seja, alongside the writers of Honey Cone's "Girls It Ain't Easy": Ronald Dunbar and the songwriting team Holland-Dozier-Holland (using the pseudonym "Edyth Wayne"). It was produced by Down With Webster and James Robertson and co-produced by Demacio Castellon. Hunter explained the songs meaning and how it came together in a radio interview:

"Ya know, it's a love song. It was written for a girl. I had made the beat and come up with the rough chorus before I played it for anybody in the band. I was like, 'I can't even play this in front of the guys. They're gonna make fun of me.' And then people liked it. I feel that my verse was really good and anyone who's into rap or what I'm into, is gonna get it."

== Music video ==
The music video for "Your Man" was shot in Toronto in 2010. It was shot in two days and was directed by Aaron A. The video premiered on March 18, 2010. It was later released through VEVO on April 8, 2010. The video shows the band performing on a fake reality show called Your Man, whose set has retro-flower decorations like the old Dating Game. During the video, the show's host, Staci Hamilton and audience watch as three of the band members go on separate dates. On YouTube, the music video for "Your Man" crossed one million views in fall 2010. As of 2023, it has over 4 million views on YouTube. The video was nominated for a MuchMusic Video Award for Best Pop Video.

The video debuted on the MuchMusic Countdown at number 8 in the week of March 25, 2010. It reached number one in the week of July 8, 2010.

== Awards and nominations ==
Awards and nominations for "Your Man"
Year	Organization	Award	Result	Ref(s)
2010	MuchMusic Video Awards	Best Pop Video	Nominated	
2011	Canadian Radio Music Awards	SOCAN Song of the Year	Nominated	

== Live performances ==
"Your Man" has been performed live by the band on many occasions since its release. Down with Webster performed the song at the 2010 MuchMusic Video Awards on June 20, 2010.

== Chart performance ==
"Your Man" debuted at number 91 on the Canadian Hot 100 for the week of February 13, 2010, and peaked at number 12 for the week of April 24, 2010, higher than the band's first single, "Rich Girl$", which peaked at number 21. "Your Man" spent 29 weeks on the Canadian Hot 100. The song was ranked number 37 on the 2010 Canadian Hot 100 Year End Chart.

== Charts ==
=== Weekly charts ===
Weekly chart performance for "Your Man"
Chart (2010)	Peak position
Canada (Canadian Hot 100)	12
Canada CHR/Top 40 (Billboard)	9
Canada Hot AC (Billboard)	7

=== Year-end charts ===
Year-end chart performance for "Your Man"
Chart (2010)	Position
Canada (Canadian Hot 100)	37

== Certifications ==
Certification and sales for "Your Man"
Region	Certification	Certified units/sales
Canada (Music Canada)	Platinum	40,000^{*}
^{*} Sales figures based on certification alone.

== Release history ==
Release dates and formats for "Your Man"
Region	Date	Format	Label	Ref.
Canada	January 20, 2010	Contemporary hit radio	Universal Motown / Universal Music	
United States	April 27, 2010	Contemporary hit radio	Universal Motown / Universal Music	
