= Time to Win, Vol. II =

Time to Win, Vol. 2

Studio album by Down with Webster
- Released: October 31, 2011 (Digital); November 1, 2011 (Physical)
- Recorded: 2010–2011
- Genre: Rap rock
- Length: 51:07
- Label: Universal Music
- Producer: Down with Webster, The Maven Boys, Boi-1da, Matthew Burnett, Zale Epstein, Stephen Kozmeniuk, Brett Ryan Kruger, Megaman, James Robertson

Down with Webster chronology
Time to Win, Vol. 1 (2009)	Time to Win, Vol. 2 (2011)	iTunes Session (2011)

Singles from Time to Win, Vol. 2
- 1. "She's Dope" Released: May 23, 2011; 2. "Big Wheels" Released: September 9, 2011; 3. "Royalty" Released: January 10, 2012; 4. "Jessica" Released: April 20, 2012

Time to Win, Vol. 2 is an album by Canadian rap rock band Down with Webster. It was released digitally on October 31, 2011, while physical versions of the album were released on November 1, 2011. The album was released through Universal Music Canada. This is the band's first major label full-length album. The album has peaked at No. 9 on the Canadian Albums Chart.

== Background and recording ==
Time to Win, Vol. 2 was supposed to be the second of two seven-track mini-albums, following up to the band's debut mini-album, Time to Win, Vol. 1 which was released in 2009. It was initially supposed to be released in the Spring of 2010. Bucky explained in an interview that the original concept was to release Time to Win in two mini-LP volumes because the band wanted "to get as much music out there as we could constantly, instead of having to wait a whole two to three years before we put another one out."

Cameron Hunter explained in an interview in September 2010 that Time to Win, Volume 2, "probably would have been out a lot sooner, but the first one did a lot better than we expected, and a lot of other people expected and as a result, it gets pushed back as we shoot more videos. As a result, the new one probably won't be out until the New Year, but the original concept was they would be maybe six months apart, but things have taken a different turn." The band later changed their mind and turned Time to Win, Vol. 2 into a full-length record. In an interview with Canada.com, Hunter said the record will "be a lot longer" and will have "12 or 13 songs" on it. The release was delayed until 2011 with the album looking to release in the "end of summer to early fall."

Hunter also talked about some collaborations saying that the band "got to work with some different producers than we used on the first one. We got to work with some other key people, namely Boi-1da." On working with Boi-1da, Hunter said "we got some wicked stuff out of him, considering he's a straight-up hip-hop guy. The songs we made with him don't sound like anything that he's done. One of them is a track we're going to try to put to rock, alternative-rock radio. The song is called 'Professional'. I'm really pumped about that."

Other producers on the album include Matthew Burnett, Zale Epstein, Stephen Kozmeniuk, Brett Ryan Kruger, Megaman and James Robertson. Robertson has also been a producer on the band's previous album, Time to Win, Vol. 1 and the band's 2007 self-titled self-released album. Far East Movement collaborated with Down with Webster in one song on the album.

Recording locations of the album include Chille Ville Studios in Toronto, Diamond Factory Studios in Toronto, The Garage and Rumblecone in Toronto while mixing locations include South Beach Studios in Miami, Rumblecone in Toronto, Chille Ville Studios in Toronto and Gimme More Music Studios in Toronto. The albums was mastered at Sterling Sound in New York City.

Tyler Armes told Regina Leader-Post how the band has been working on the record since December 2010 saying, "We've been in the studio pretty much since December of last year getting our new record done." Armes also compared the writing to the band's previous EP, Time to Win, Vol. 1 saying, "a lot of the songs that we wrote on the last EP, which came out in 2009, some of them were written as far back as 2006 and 2007. This record was primarily written in the last year or two, and it's night and day listening to something we wrote in 2006 or 2007 versus 2010."

== Composition ==
In an interview on Global Toronto, Hunter stated that the album will be "a little bit more grown up" than their previous albums. Armes also talked to Regina Leader-Post about a different sound in the album saying, "Everything just sounds bigger. We spent a lot of time on the guitars and drums on this record. It's definitely a growth in terms of where we've come from." On October 3, 2011, Down with Webster confirmed on their Facebook page that there will be 13 tracks on the album.

MuchMusic said that "So Positive," "showcases the dedication and hard work by the boys with their insane guitar, drums, and piano work."

== Release and promotion ==
Down with Webster went on a tour in early 2011 to support the album. WINtour 2011 began on February 22 in Lethbridge and ended on March 12 in Toronto. The tour featured 15 concerts across Canada.

A demo of a new song called "Staring at the Sun" was posted on SoundCloud in early 2011. "I Want It All" was used in MuchMusic's "That Much Closer" for the 2011 MuchMusic Video Awards. The song was recorded with Boi-1da. In late August 2011, a 2:36-second clip of "Professional" was released by the band onto their YouTube, SoundCloud and Facebook pages with the video containing segments from various concerts.

A snippet of "Go Time" was played at the end of the last chapter of a series that was shown on MuchMusic called, SunDown With Webster by Doritos Late Night Chips. The four chapters were released a week apart from one another in the order: Inspiration, Conception, Execution, and Performance.

The album was released digitally on October 31, 2011, and physical versions were released on November 1, 2011. November 8, 2011, was the initial release but was later moved up to October 31. The album was made available to pre-order from October 18, 2011, on iTunes. Along with the pre-order, the song "Professional" was made available to download on October 18, 2011, on iTunes. Down with Webster performed songs off the album and were interviewed in Live @ Much with Down with Webster, an hour-long television special on Much Music. A CD release concert was performed on October 30, 2011, at The Mod Club in Toronto.

== Singles ==
The first single from the album, "She's Dope" was released on May 23, 2011, through digital distribution. It debuted at No. 52 on the Canadian Hot 100 and has since peaked at No. 18.

"Big Wheels" will be released as the album's second single. A music video for the song was filmed on August 14, 2011. "Big Wheels" was released to radio on September 9, 2011. On September 13, 2011, the song was released through digital distribution. The music video premier for "Big Wheels" was shown on September 19, 2011, on the MuchMusic show, New.Music.Live. The song has peaked at No. 51 on the Canadian Hot 100.

"Royalty" is the third single from the album. On January 8, 2012, a music video for the song was filmed and on January 10 the song was released to radio.

== Reception ==
=== Commercial ===
The album debuted at No. 62 on the Canadian Albums Chart for the week of November 12, 2011. The album was the sixth bestselling CD at HMVs across Canada for the week ending November 5, 2011. The album jumped to No. 9 on the chart for the week of November 19, 2011, selling 6,000 copies in Canada in that week. The album earned a nomination at the 2012 Juno Awards for "Pop Album of the Year".

=== Critical ===
Professional ratings
Review scores
Source	Rating
MuchMusic	(8/10)
Montreal Gazette	2.5/5 stars
MusiquePlus	(7.5/10)
Under The Gun Review	(9/10)
bestfan.com	(favorable)

Much Music gave the album an 8/10 saying "you can feel the emotions that DWW were trying to project when listening to each song." Much Music also praised the song "Work" saying Down with Webster and Far East Movement "mesh perfectly" and commented on the lyrics saying "However, there was a consistent theme of winning and girls and you can tell that the boys have matured through their dope lyrics."

Grace Duffy of Under The Gun Review gave the album nine out of ten stars saying that the album is "fast-paced and exhilarating throughout, but deftly mixes a diverse range of sounds, lyrical themes, and instruments" and also adding that "The mixing of styles is a striking enhancement of its appeal, its variety and accessibility ensuring it should reach the widest audience possible." bestfan.com said that Time to Win, Vol. 2 "won us over from the first to the last song."

Al Kratina of the Montreal Gazette gave the album two and a half stars out of five saying "It's all popped collars, testosterone, and pick-up lines, like someone turned a drag race into open mic night" but also adding that one may begin "appreciating the organic drums, the hand-clap production in Professional and the occasional electronic flourish in Go Time."

== Track listing ==
Time to Win, Vol. II
No.	Title	Writer(s)	Producer(s)	Length
1.	"Go Time"	Tyler Armes, Patrick Gillett, Cameron Hunter, Andrew Martino, Martin Seja	Down With Webster, James Robertson	3:27
2.	"Professional"	T. Armes, Sam Chown, Jared Evans, P. Gillett, C. Hunter, A. Martino, Orville Jermaine McWhinney, Matthew Samuels, M. Seja	Boi-1da, MegaMan (Additional Producing)	2:37
3.	"She's Dope"	T. Armes, P. Gillett, C. Hunter, A. Martino, M. Seja	Down With Webster, James Robertson	4:08
4.	"Big Wheels"	T. Armes, P. Gillett, C. Hunter, A. Martino, M. Seja	Down With Webster, James Robertson	3:13
5.	"Grind"	T. Armes, P. Gillett, C. Hunter, A. Martino, M. Seja	Down With Webster, James Robertson	4:21
6.	"Staring at the Sun"	T. Armes, P. Gillett, C. Hunter, A. Martino, M. Seja	Down With Webster, James Robertson	3:15
7.	"I Want It All"	T. Armes, Matthew Burnett, P. Gillett, C. Hunter, A. Martino, M. Samuels, M. Seja	Boi-1da, Matthew Burnett (Additional Producing)	4:26
8.	"White Flags"	T. Armes, P. Gillett, C. Hunter, Stephen Kozmeniuk, A. Martino, Rodney Christopher Morgan, M. Seja	Down With Webster, Stephen Kozmeniuk	4:41
9.	"Royalty"	T. Armes, P. Gillett, C. Hunter, A. Martino, M. Seja	Down With Webster, Zale Epstein, Brett Ryan Kruger	4:21
10.	"So Cold"	T. Armes, P. Gillett, C. Hunter, A. Martino, M. Seja	Down With Webster, Stephen Kozmeniuk	3:50
11.	"Jessica"	Eric Alcock, T. Armes, Zale Epstein, P. Gillett, C. Hunter, Brett Ryan Kruger, A. Martino, M. Seja	Down With Webster, Zale Epstein, Brett Ryan Kruger	3:31
12.	"Work" (feat. Far East Movement)	T. Armes, Jae Choung, Virman Coquia, Z. Epstein, P. Gillett, C. Hunter, B. R. Kruger, A. Martino, O. J. McWhinney, Kevin Nishimura, James Roh, M. Seja	Megaman, Zale Epstein, Brett Ryan Kruger	3:53
13.	"So Positive"	T. Armes, P. Gillett, C. Hunter, A. Martino, M. Seja	Down With Webster, James Robertson	5:24

iTunes Deluxe Version Bonus tracks
No.	Title	Length
14.	"Home in a Heartbeat"	3:29
15.	"Cross The Line"	3:29
16.	"She's Dope" (music video)	4:18
17.	"Big Wheels" (music video)	3:22
18.	"Light The Night" (iTunes (pre-order only)	2:40

Sample credits

- "Royalty" contains a sample of Freshlyground's "I'd Like"

== Personnel ==
- Down with Webster – producer
  - Tyler Armes – bass guitar, keyboards
  - Dave "D!ggy" Ferris – DJ
  - Patrick "Pat" Gillett – guitar, vocals
  - Cameron "Cam" Hunter – rap vocals
  - Andrew "Marty" Martino – drums
  - Martin "Bucky" Seja – rap vocals
- Erik Alcock – additional guitar, background vocals
- Matt Barnes – photography
- Matthew Burnett – additional production
- Boi-1da – producer
- Demacio "Demo" Castellon – executive producer, engineering, mixing
- Tom Coyne – mastering
- Sunny Diamonds – engineering, mixing, pre-mixing of vocals, additional vocal mixing
- Zale Epstein – producer, engineering
- Far East Movement – rap vocals
- Jordan Jacobs and Ryan Armes, SpyBox Media – management
- Stephen Kozmeniuk – producer, engineering, additional guitar
- Brett Ryan Kruger – producer
- Tyson Kuteyi – mixing
- Tom Lord-Alge – mixing
- Megaman – producer, additional production
- Gord Marriott – announcer in "Go Time"
- James Robertson – producer, engineering, mixing
- Liz Rodrigues – vocals
- Kathryn Rose – background vocals
- Conner Sharpe – additional engineering
- Shmu – guitar

== Charts ==
=== Weekly charts ===
Weekly chart performance for Time to Win, Vol. 2
Chart (2011)	Peak position
Canadian Albums (Billboard)	9

=== Year-end charts ===
Year-end chart performance for Time to Win, Vol. 2
Chart (2011)	Position
Canadian Albums (Nielsen SoundScan)	135
