= ITunes Session (Wilco EP) =

iTunes Session

EP by Wilco
- Released: January 20, 2012
- Recorded: December 11, 2011
- Studio: The Loft (Chicago, Illinois)
- Genre: Rock
- Length: 29:59
- Label: dBpm

iTunes Session is a live extended play (EP) by the American rock band Wilco. It was released by dBpm Records on January 20, 2012.

== Background and recording ==
The EP was recorded at the band's loft in Chicago shortly before Christmas.

== Critical reception ==
Professional ratings
Review scores
| Source | Rating |
|---|---|
| AllMusic | 3.5/5 stars |
| Consequence | D− |
| Pitchfork | 6.7/10 |
| Rolling Stone | 3.5/5 stars |

iTunes Session received generally mixed reviews from critics. Justin Gerber of Consequence asked, "If there's nothing special to distinguish this from the original recording, then why bother?" Stephen M. Deusner of Pitchfork said, "Toward that end, iTunes Session emphasizes the immediate over the arty". Will Hermes of Rolling Stone said, "No wheels reinvented here, but they all roll pretty good."

== Track listing ==
iTunes Session track listing
| No. | Title | Writer(s) | Length |
|---|---|---|---|
| 1. | "Dawned on Me" | Jeff Tweedy | 3:46 |
| 2. | "Born Alone" | Tweedy | 4:09 |
| 3. | "I Might" | Tweedy | 3:57 |
| 4. | "Black Moon" | Tweedy; Jay Bennett | 3:47 |
| 5. | "Whole Love" | Tweedy | 3:57 |
| 6. | "War on War" | Tweedy | 3:18 |
| 7. | "Passenger Side" | Tweedy | 3:36 |
| 8. | "Cruel to Be Kind" (featuring Nick Lowe) | Nick Lowe; Ian Gomm | 3:26 |
| Total length: | | | 29:59 |

== Charts ==
Chart performance
| Chart (2012) | Peak position |
|---|---|
| US Billboard 200 | 54 |
| US Independent Albums (Billboard) | 9 |
| US Top Rock & Alternative Albums (Billboard) | 14 |
