= Coors Event Centre =

Events hall in Saskatoon, Saskatchewan, Canada

Coordinates: 52.126638°N 106.665068°W

- Interactive map of Coors Event Centre
- Former names: Victoria Theatre (1913-30); Tivoli (1930-64); Grodieon (1965-88); Paradise (1995-2003); Odeon Events Centre (2004-13); O'Brians Event Centre (2014-18)
- Address: 241 2nd Ave South
- Location: Saskatoon, Saskatchewan
- Capacity: 1,000

Construction
- Built: 1913
- Expanded: 2009

Website
- Venue Website

Coors Event Centre is an events hall in Saskatoon, Saskatchewan, Canada. The centre contains several large rooms is used for concerts, banquets, and other special events. In 2009, the former theater was renovated and combined with the neighboring former Royal Bank of Canada building. Combined, the centre totals 20,000 square feet.

Originally built as a theatre, the building has had several names over its history:

- Built as the Victoria Theatre (1913)
- Renamed the Tivoli in (1930)
- closed (1964-1965)
- Re-opened as the Grodieon (1965)
- take over by Cineplex Odeon (1984)
- closed (1988)
- re-opened as the Paradise (1995)
- re-opened as Odeon Event Centre (2004)
- re-branded O'Brians Event Centre (2014)
- re-branded Coors Event Centre (2018)
