= Party for Your Life =

Studio album by Down with Webster
- Released: January 28, 2014
- Recorded: 2012–2013
- Genre: Pop; pop rap
- Length: 39:34
- Label: Universal Music
- Producer: Boi-1da; James Robertson; Zale Epstein; Brett Kruger; Ludwig Göransson; Drew Pearson; Andrew Martino; David Audet; Luke Christopher; Jared Gosselin; Mike Anthony Turco

Down with Webster chronology
Time to Win, Vol. 2 (2011)	Party for Your Life (2014)	V (2021)

Singles from Party for Your Life
- 1. "One in a Million" Released: March 26, 2013; 2. "Party for Your Life" Released: August 13, 2013; 3. "Chills" Released: December 17, 2013

Party for Your Life is the third album by Canadian rap rock band Down with Webster. The album was officially released on January 28, 2014. It contained three singles, "One in a Million", "Party for Your Life" and "Chills".

== Background and release ==
Rapper Cameron Hunter stated that the album was "a lot more uptempo" than their previous albums. In an interview for the Ottawa Citizen, bassist Tyler Armes said, "There has definitely been a step made — I just don't think it was a conscious change in any direction. We like to think we are just getting better at what we are doing."

Party for Your Life was originally set for release on October 22, 2013, however was later pushed back to January 28, 2014. Hunter stated that the group had "written new material and wanted to make some changes." The album peaked at number two on the Billboard Canadian Albums Chart. The album sold 6,500 copies in its first week, 500 copies more than their previous album Time to Win, Vol. 2.

It was also nominated for Pop Album of the Year of the Juno Awards of 2015.

== Singles ==
"One in a Million" was the first single released from the album on March 26, 2013. The song peaked at number 27 on the Billboard Canadian Hot 100. It also reached number 12 on the Canada CHR/Top 40 chart and number 22 on Canada Hot AC chart. The song was certified platinum in December 2013. The second single, "Party for Your Life", was released on August 13, 2013, and peaked at number 67 on the Billboard Canadian Hot 100. "Chills" was released as the third single and peaked at number 19 on the Billboard Canadian Hot 100. It also reached the Canada CHR/Top 40 chart at number 13, Canada Hot AC chart at number 16 and Canada AC chart at number 21. The song sold 78,000 digital copies according to Nielsen Music and was certified platinum in 2014.

== Critical reception ==
Professional ratings
Review scores
Source	Rating
Canadian Beats	4.5/5 stars
99Scenes	6/10

Party for Your Life was generally received with positive reviews from music critics. Amanda Hather of Canadian Beats stated, "The album has a mix of songs that you can dance up a storm with plus songs that are more laid back but still have a fun sound to them." Both Hather and Keith Sharp from The Music Express responded well to the tracks "Gravity" and "Don't Even Care". Sharp believed that these songs demonstrated that the band had refined their sound on the album. He also thought "One in a Million" and "Feel So Alive" were straightforward pop songs that showed they were "making great strides in their songwriting and performance development."

== Track listing ==
All tracks are written by Tyler Armes, Cameron Hunter, Pat Gillet and Andrew Martino, except where noted.

Standard Edition
No.	Title	Writer(s)	Length
1.	"Introduction"		1:08
2.	"Going Nowhere"	Armes, Hunter, Gillet, Martino, Zale Epstein, Rupert Thomas Jr., Brett Kruger	4:03
3.	"Party for Your Life"	Armes, Hunter, Gillet, Martino, Martin Seja	3:44
4.	"Chills"	Armes, Hunter, Gillet, Martino, Epstein, Boi-1da, Kruger, Emerson Brooks	3:28
5.	"One in a Million"	Armes, Hunter, Gillet, Martino, Seja, Dave Ferris, Ludwig Göransson	3:14
6.	"Circles"	Armes, Hunter, Gillet, Martino, Drew Pearson, Jenson Vaughn	4:13
7.	"Everybody's Angel"		4:14
8.	"Feel So Alive"	Armes, Hunter, Gillet, Martino, Epstein, Brooks, Kruger	4:02
9.	"Don't Even Care"	Armes, Hunter, Gillet, Martino, Teddy Pena	3:26
10.	"I Need the World"	Armes, Hunter, Gillet, Martino, Seja, Ferris, David Audet	3:37
11.	"Gravity"		4:19

Deluxe Edition
No.	Title	Writer(s)	Length
12.	"Gentlemen Man"		3:28
13.	"Heaven"	Armes, Hunter, Gillet, Martino, Luke Christopher, Jared Gosselin	3:49
14.	"One in a Million" (David A. Remix)		4:53
15.	"One in a Million" (Charlie Darker Remix)		5:15

== Personnel ==
Credits adapted from album's liner notes.

Down with Webster

- Tyler Armes – bass guitar, keyboards, composer
- Dave "Diggy" Ferris – DJ
- Patrick "Pat" Gillett – vocals, guitar, composer
- Cameron "Cam" Hunter – vocals, composer
- Andrew "Marty" Martino – drums, composer
- Martin "Bucky" Seja – vocals, composer

Additional musicians

- Keith Alexander Fogah – additional vocals (track 2, 8)
- Shakira Bryan – additional vocals (track 2)
- Dwayne Morgan – additional vocals (track 2)
- Emerson Brooks – additional vocals (track 8)
- Zale Epstein – additional vocals (track 2, 8), drums (track 2, 8), bass guitar
- James Robertson – guitar (track 2)
- Brett Kruger – keyboards (track 2, 8)
- Danny Turco – bass guitar (track 7)
- Alex Isaak – guitar (track 8)

Production

- James Robertson – producer
- Boi-1da – producer (track 4)
- Zale Epstein – producer (track 2, 8)
- Brett Kruger – producer (track 2, 8)
- Ludwig Göransson – producer (track 5)
- Drew Pearson – producer (track 6)
- Andrew Martino – producer (track 7, 11, 12)
- David Audet – producer (track 10)
- Luke Christopher – producer (track 13)
- Jared Gosselin – producer (track 13)
- Mike Anthony Turco – producer (track 3, 7), mixing (track 1, 6, 7, 9, 11, 12)
- Tyson Kutey – mixing (track 2, 8, 10)
- Alex Aldi – mixing (track 14, 15)
- Sunny Diamonds – engineer

== Charts ==
Chart performance for Party for Your Life
Chart (2014)	Peak position
Canadian Albums (Billboard)	2
