= Hail the Villain =

Canadian rock band

- Origin: Oshawa, Ontario, Canada
- Genres: Hard rock; alternative metal; post-grunge; nu metal
- Years active: 2003–2012
- Labels: Warner; Roadrunner
- Past members: Joseph Stamp; Flavio Cirillo; Chad Richardson; Bryan Crouch

Hail the Villain was a Canadian hard rock band from Oshawa, Ontario, who released one studio album in 2010, before going on indefinite hiatus. The record, titled Population: Declining, was nominated for Rock Album of the Year at the 2011 Juno Awards.

== History ==
Hail the Villain was formed in Oshawa, Ontario, in 2003, and in 2009, they released their debut album under Warner Music Canada, titled Population: Declining; it was re-issued a year later by Roadrunner. The record was nominated for Rock Album of the Year at the 2011 Juno Awards. One of the singles, "Runaway", was featured in the 2011 sports comedy drama film Win Win.

In November 2011, Hail the Villain announced that after seven years with the band, their vocalist, Bryan Crouch, had quit. Crouch later formed the band Six Side Die.

== Band members ==
- Bryan Crouch – vocals (2003–2011)
- Joseph Stamp – lead guitar (2003–2012)
- Chad Richardson – bass guitar (2003–2012)
- Flavio Cirillo – drums (2009–2012)

== Discography ==
=== Studio albums ===
- Population: Declining

Population: Declining

Studio album by Hail the Villain
- Released: June 8, 2010 (re-release)
- Recorded: Metalworks Studios in Mississauga, Ontario
- Genres: Hard rock; alternative rock; nu metal
- Labels: Warner; Roadrunner

=== EPs ===
- Maintain Radio Silence (2010)

=== Singles ===
Year	Song	Peak chart positions				Album
Year	Song	CAN Alt	CAN Rock	US Main	US Rock	Album
2010	"Take Back the Fear"	15	13	20	32	Population: Declining
2010	"Runaway"	21	14	24	46	Population: Declining
2011	"My Reward"	—	—	—	—	Population: Declining
