= V (Down with Webster album) =

Studio album by Down with Webster
- Released: February 19, 2021
- Recorded: 2015
- Length: 38:52
- Label: DWW Entertainment
- Producer: Down with Webster; James Robertson; Davey Badiuk; Zale Epstein

Down with Webster chronology
Party for Your Life (2014)	V (2021)

Singles from V
- 1. "Love Is Not Enough" Released: June 25, 2020; 2. "Take Us Alive" Released: July 24, 2020

V is the fourth studio album by Canadian rap rock band Down with Webster. The album was released independently on February 19, 2021. It contained two singles, "Love Is Not Enough" and "Take Us Alive".

== Background and release ==
After having gone a few years without releasing new music since 2014, Down with Webster announced on June 2, 2017, that the group was going on hiatus and that the members, excluding Martin Seja and Dave Ferris, were forming a new group called Honors. In a 2020 interview with iHeartRadio, lead vocalist Pat Gillett stated, "If the stars align maybe there will be a DWW reunion."

On June 25, 2020, the group resurfaced, releasing a new single titled, "Love Is Not Enough". The band returned without DJ Dave Ferris, who left when the band went on hiatus. "Take Us Alive" was released on July 24, 2020, as the album's second single. They later announced that they would be releasing a new album, which was recorded in 2015. According to the group, "it didn't feel right to release it at the time." The album was officially released on February 19, 2021, with bassist Tyler Armes confirming that this would be the final Down with Webster album.

== Critical reception ==
Luke Wells of Soundigest stated that "Love Is Not Enough", "packs a nostalgic punch of Down with Webster's signature sound, with Armes' lusciously layered synth swaddling Gillett's smooth as butter delivery." He also praised the song "Take Us Alive" that, "brings forth an aura of nostalgia to random summer-esque memories." He also described the track as "80s inspired."

== Track listing ==
Standard edition
No.	Title	Length
1.	"Take Us Alive"	4:31
2.	"Hurricane"	3:20
3.	"Live Wire"	3:46
4.	"Slay"	3:42
5.	"Wrong Places"	3:27
6.	"Nothings Cool"	3:53
7.	"Prove Yourself"	4:57
8.	"Another World"	3:33
9.	"Rockets"	3:46
10.	"Love Is Not Enough"	3:54
Total length:		38:52

2023 version
No.	Title	Length
1.	"Take Us Alive"	4:31
2.	"Live Wire"	3:46
3.	"Slay"	3:42
4.	"Nothings Cool"	3:53
5.	"Prove Yourself"	4:57
6.	"Another World"	3:33
7.	"Rockets"	3:46
8.	"Love Is Not Enough"	3:54

== Personnel ==
Credits for V adapted from digital liner notes.

Down with Webster

- Tyler Armes – bass, keyboards, composer, lyricist, producer
- Patrick Gillett – vocals, guitar, composer, lyricist, producer
- Cameron Hunter – rap vocals, composer, lyricist, producer
- Andrew Martino – drums, percussion, composer, lyricist, producer
- Martin Seja – rap vocals, producer

Production

- Davey Badiuk – engineering, mixing, producer
- Stephen Paul – mastering
- Emerson Brooks – composer
- Zale Epstein – composer, producer
- Omar West Forbes – composer
- Joelle Hadjia – composer
- Brett Kruger – composer
- James Robertson – producer
- Greg Sczebel – composer
- Sunny Diamonds – composer
- Kashkay Taharah – composer

== Release history ==
Release dates and formats for V
Region	Date	Format(s)	Label	Ref.
Various	February 19, 2021	Digital download	DWW Entertainment	
