= Down with Webster (album) =

Studio album by Down with Webster
- Released: June 26, 2007
- Genre: Hip hop, rock, pop
- Length: 50:38
- Label: Duck Duck Goose Productions Inc.
- Producer: Down with Webster; James Robertson

Down with Webster chronology
Down with Webster (2007)	Time to Win, Vol. 1 (2009)

Singles from Down with Webster
- 1. "Weekends" Released: June 2006; 2. "Miracle Mile" Released: 2007

Down with Webster is the debut album by Canadian band Down with Webster. It was self released on June 26, 2007. The band worked with producer James Robertson on this album. Robertson later co-produced the band's major label debut, Time to Win, Vol. 1.

"Weekends" received airplay on the Toronto radio station, CHUM FM. A music video for "Miracle Mile" was filmed. It was directed by Geoff McLean.

== Background ==
The album was written and produced by the group in their garage studio in 2006. James Robertson also helped produce the album. Originally, the record was planned to be released in January 2007, however was pushed back into the spring of 2007, until finally being released in June 2007.

The band toured around Eastern Canada in the fall of 2006. They also played at the NXNE Festival and the Drake Underground.

== Later appearances ==
"Miracle Mile" later appeared on Down with Webster's major label debut Time to Win, Vol. 1 in 2009. "Miracle Mile" was used on Universal Motowns insistence.

"Grind" appeared on Down with Webster's Time to Win, Vol. 2 which was released on October 31, 2011. Some of the songs on the album were included in the setlist for the WINtour 2011 concert tour.

== Track listing ==
No.	Title	Length
1.	"Miracle Mile"	3:46
2.	"Pop Your Trunk"	3:57
3.	"Fun!"	4:39
4.	"Weekends"	3:16
5.	"Dynamite"	1:07
6.	"Odies"	4:00
7.	"Grind"	4:21
8.	"Let Me In"	3:18
9.	"Gon' Do It"	3:34
10.	"Ten"	2:01
11.	"Coconuts"	3:57
12.	"Go Go Girl"	3:45
13.	"Big Time"	5:55
14.	"Butta King (Hidden Track)"	3:02
