= Cameron Hunter (musician) =

American-Canadian rapper (born 1986)

Camm Hunter
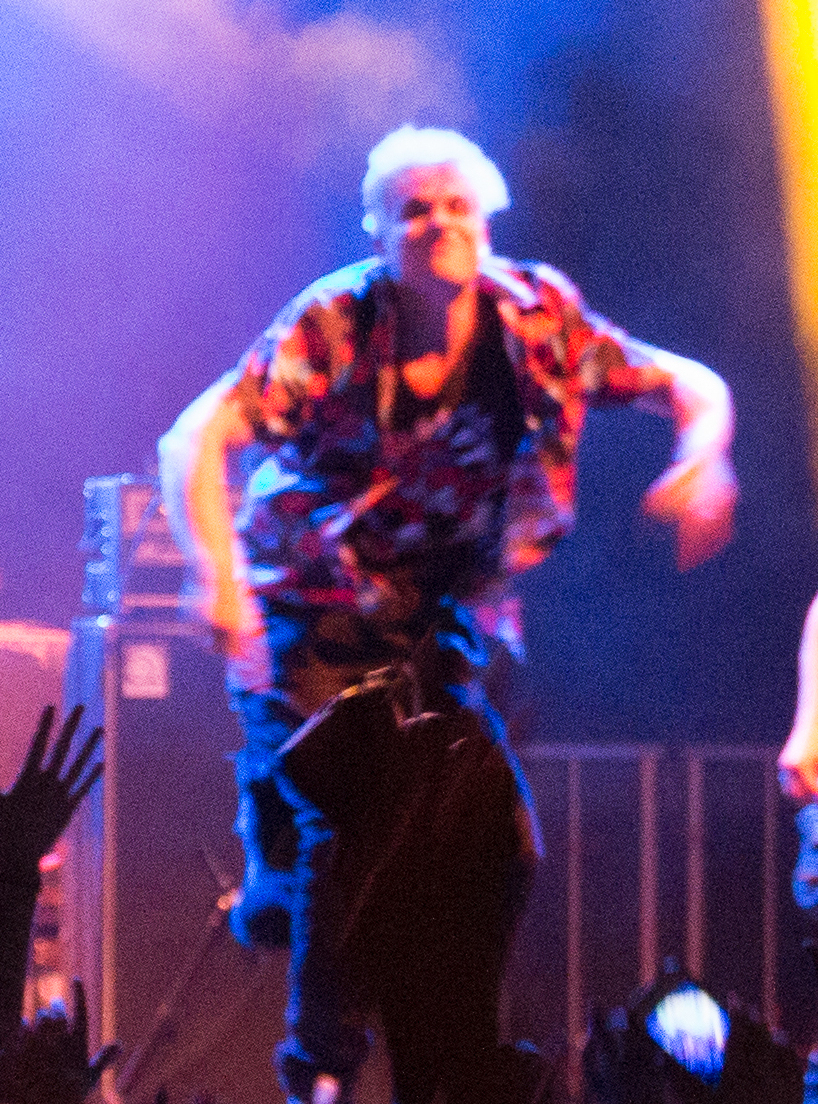

Background information
- Also known as: Cam Solo
- Born: Cameron MacLeod Hunter; January 29, 1986 (age 40); New York City, U.S.
- Genres: Hip hop; pop; rap rock
- Occupations: Rapper; singer; songwriter
- Instrument: Vocals
- Years active: 1998–present
- Member of: Down with Webster; The Yard
- Formerly of: Honors

Cameron MacLeod Hunter (born January 29, 1986), known professionally as Camm Hunter, is an American-Canadian rapper and singer. He is best known as one of the rappers of Canadian rap rock band Down with Webster. He was also a member of the band Honors. As a solo artist he has released two albums, one mixtape and 11 singles. He has also made an appearance on Punk Goes Pop Volume 4 with Silverstein.

== Early life ==
Hunter was born in New York City, and grew up in Toronto, Ontario. He met future Down with Webster bandmate Tyler Armes in the seventh grade at Glen Ames Senior Public School, where they were vice president and president of their student council. He also used to be sponsored for skateboarding as a kid and took karate lessons. Hunter started listening to rap music at a young age and began rapping at the age of twelve. He rapped at house parties and later performed with Down with Webster at their concerts before dropping out of McMaster University to pursue music full-time.

== Career ==
Down with Webster released their debut independent self-titled album in 2007. They signed with Universal/Motown in 2009 and released their EP Time to Win, Vol. I that year. Their second studio album, Time to Win, Vol. II was released on October 31, 2011. The third studio album, Party for Your Life, was released on January 28, 2014. Their fourth and final studio album, V was released in 2021. On April 1, 2024, Down with Webster returned and announced via social media that the band will be having a reunion tour in the summer with upcoming tour dates.

In 2011, Hunter was featured in Silverstein's cover of "Runaway" for the compilation album, Punk Goes Pop Volume 4.

On September 24, 2013, Hunter released his debut mixtape, Just Me. He released his first single "SOB" on January 13, 2014, along with its music video. He released the song "Oh Lord" for free on SoundCloud on May 20, 2014. The song was later released as the lead single on September 10, 2014. Hunter performed at the NXNE Festival on June 24, 2014. He released his debut album, Just Saying on January 2, 2015. The album peaked at number one on the Canadian iTunes Hip-Hop and Rap Albums chart. In the spring of 2015, Hunter embarked on a headlining tour called the Just Tour. While on tour, his live band consists of Dave Ferris of Down with Webster and drummer Emerson Tavares. In March 2015, he released a non-album single titled, "25 Below" which features samples from the song "Ca$hville" by Torro Torro.

In 2016, he was featured in a song called "Goddess" by Canadian artist Jillea. He was also featured on the single "Vice" by Kyle Lucas. In 2016, he formed the band Honors with former Down with Webster members, Pat Gillett, Tyler Armes and Andrew Martino.

In 2021, Hunter released his second studio album, Late but Won't Run. He also helped direct music videos for artists such as Civic TV, Hodgy, and Tyler Shaw. In 2022, He also signed a publishing deal as a songwriter. Hunter started a new project with Mike Gonek called The Yard in 2023.

== Discography ==
Down with Webster

- Down with Webster (2007)
- Time to Win, Vol. I (2009)
- Time to Win, Vol. II (2011)
- Party for Your Life (2014)
- V (2021)

=== Albums ===
List of albums with selected details
Title	Album details
Just Saying	Released: January 2, 2015; Label: Self-released; Format: DL
Late but Won't Run	Released: August 6, 2021; Label: Self-released; Format: DL

=== Mixtapes ===
List of mixtapes with selected details
Title	Album details
Just Me	Released: September 24, 2013; Label: Self-released; Format: DL

=== Singles ===
List of singles as lead artist, showing year released and album name
Title	Year	Album
"SOB"	2014	Just Me
"Oh Lord"	2014	Just Saying
"Hype Williams"	2014	Just Saying
"25 Below"	2015	Non-album single
"Twin" (with Honors)	2020	Late but Won't Run
"Habits"	2020	Late but Won't Run
"Hitter" (with Honors)	2020	Late but Won't Run
"Awful"	2020	Late but Won't Run
"Come Alive" (with Tim North)	2020	Late but Won't Run
"Phantom" (with Honors)	2020	Late but Won't Run
"Nunu"	2021	Late but Won't Run

List of singles as featured artist, showing year released and album name
Title	Year	Album
"Vice" (Kyle Lucas featuring Camm Hunter & STS)	2016	Almost Famous, Almost Broke
"Better Again" (Dave Mac featuring Sammy Adams & Camm Hunter)	2020	Non-album single

=== Other appearances ===
Title	Year	Artist(s)	Album	Notes	Ref.
"Runaway"	2011	Silverstein	Punk Goes Pop Volume 4	Guest vocals	
"Get Weird" (Remix)	2013	Kevvy	Non-album single	Guest vocals	
"Fortunate"	2016	Darenots	The Now is Truth	Guest vocals	
"Goddess"	2016	Jillea	Who is Jillea	Guest vocals	
"Prom King"	2018	Myer Clarity	Not All Heroes Wear Capes, Pt. 1	Guest vocals	
"Activated"	2021	C. Rowe	Activated	Guest vocals	
"spiderwebs"	2025	Sophie Powers	spiderwebs	Song credits	
