= Shock Value II Tour =

2010 concert tour by Timbaland

- Tour by Timbaland
- Associated album: Shock Value II
- Start date: January 15, 2010
- End date: February 3, 2010
- Legs: 1
- No. of shows: 13 in North America

Timbaland concert chronology
- Shock Value 2008 Tour (2008); Shock Value II Tour (2010)

The Shock Value II Tour was a 2010 concert tour by American rapper/producer, Timbaland to support his third studio album, Shock Value II (2009). The tour lasted from January 15, 2010 to February 3, 2010.

== Set list ==
1. "Timothy Where You Been"
2. "Say Something"
3. "Give It Up to Me" / "Give It to Me"
4. "The Way I Are"
5. "Morning After Dark"
6. "Oh Timbaland"
7. "Long Way Down"
8. "Can You Feel It"
9. "If We Ever Meet Again"
10. "Carry Out"
11. "Lose Control"
12. "Tomorrow in the Bottle"
13. "Promiscuous" / "Say It Right" / "SexyBack" / "My Love"

== Tour dates ==
Date	City	Country	Venue
North America
January 15, 2010	Norfolk	United States	Norva Theatre
January 16, 2010	Washington, D.C.	United States	9:30 Club
January 17, 2010	Baltimore	United States	Rams Head Live!
January 19, 2010	Boston	United States	House of Blues
January 20, 2010	New York City	United States	Irving Plaza
January 22, 2010	Toronto	Canada	The Sound Academy
January 23, 2010	Columbus	United States	Newport Music Hall
January 24, 2010	Chicago	United States	House of Blues
January 26, 2010	Englewood	United States	Gothic Theater
January 28, 2010	San Diego	United States	House of Blues
January 29, 2010	West Hollywood	United States	House of Blues
February 2, 2010	Dallas	United States	House of Blues
February 3, 2010	Houston	United States	House of Blues
