= Whoa Is Me =

Single by Down with Webster

from the album Time to Win, Vol. I
- Released: June 15, 2010
- Genre: Rap rock
- Length: 3:43
- Label: Universal Motown
- Songwriters: Tyler Armes; Patrick Gillett; Cameron Hunter; Andrew Martino; Martin Seja
- Producers: Down with Webster; James Robertson

Down With Webster singles chronology
"Your Man" (2010)	"Whoa Is Me" (2010)	"She's Dope" (2011)

Music video
- "Whoa Is Me" on YouTube

"Whoa Is Me" is a song by Canadian rap rock group Down with Webster. It was released as the third single from the band's debut EP, Time to Win, Vol. I, released on June 15, 2010. The song became successful in Canada, debuting at number 74 on the Canadian Hot 100 and peaking at number 13. The song was certified platinum in Canada in January 2011 with over 80,000 digital downloads. It was later certified double platinum by Music Canada in March 2013.

== Composition ==
"Whoa Is Me" was written by Tyler Armes, Patrick Gillett, Cameron Hunter, Andrew Martino and Martin Seja, while production was handled by the band and James Robertson. The song is a slow-tempo track, blending electronic beats and guitars, with hip-hop influences. Hunter said the song was "meant to be a little bit of a jab" and "very tongue in cheek." He also described the sound as "dark," which was something the group wanted to accomplish.

== Music video ==
The music video for "Whoa Is Me" was filmed at the Sound Academy in Toronto on July 28, 2010. It was directed by Aaron A. The video premiered on MuchMusic on August 31, 2010. It debuted on the MuchMusic Countdown at number 30 on the week of September 2, 2010, and reached number 1 on the week of October 28, 2010. The video was posted on YouTube/Vevo on August 31, 2010 and passed one million views in November of that year.

The music video features the band acting like celebrities with shots of them performing the song. In an interview with Dose.ca, Cam explained how the song "was originally kind of meant to be an ironic stab at that kind of life, that, like, overly hyped, almost celebrity-for-no-good-reason kind of phenomenon that's been going on." He also explained that none of the video actually rings true to how they really act: "Oh! Absolutely none of it, except when we're on stage. I think that's the only look you get into what we actually do. I think everything else is meant to be over the top and ridiculous." He also talked about how the performance scene was recorded at "maybe triple the speed of what it's normally done at, and then, in post-production, we slowed it down. It gives this cool effect where it looks like you're in time, but you're still in slow motion."

The music video received four nominations at the 2011 MuchMusic Video Awards, winning one, Pop Video of the Year. The other three nominations were Video of the Year, UR Fave: Artist, and UR Fave: Video.

== Live performances ==
The song was performed live by the band at the 2010 NHL Face-Off in Toronto on October 7, 2010. It was broadcast across Canada by CBC Television during the second intermission of the Toronto Maple Leafs vs. Montreal Canadiens game. The performance was also broadcast on the NHL Network.

The song was also performed live at the 2010 Grey Cup preshow in Edmonton, Alberta, broadcast by TSN, and at the Liberal Party victory celebration after the 2025 federal elections.

== Remixes ==
A few remixes of "Whoa Is Me" have been released. One version of the song was released on December 15, 2009 on iTunes. This version was remixed by Cobra Starship member Alex Suarez. Another remixed version of the song, remixed by Barletta, was released for free on January 25, 2011.

== Chart performance ==
The song debuted on the Canadian Hot 100 at #95 on the week of September 4, 2010. It peaked at #13 on the week of October 16, 2010. "Whoa Is Me" spent a total of 21 weeks on the Canadian Hot 100. The song was also featured at #85 on the 2010 Canadian Hot 100 Year-end chart.

== Track listing ==
Digital download
No.	Title	Length
1.	"Whoa Is Me"	3:43
2.	"Jump Ship"	2:53

Alex Suarez Remix - digital download
No.	Title	Length
1.	"Whoa Is Me (Alex Suarez Remix)"	3:58

== Personnel ==
Credits for "Whoa Is Me" adapted from album's liner notes.

Down with Webster

- Patrick Gillett – vocals, guitar
- Cameron Hunter – vocals
- Martin Seja – vocals
- Tyler Armes – bass guitar, keyboards
- Dave Ferris – DJ
- Kyle Fairlie – hype man

Production

- Down with Webster – producer
- James Robertson – producer, recording engineer
- Tom Lord-Alge – mixing
- Femio Hernandez – assistant mixing
- Tom Coyne – mastering

== Charts ==
=== Weekly charts ===
Weekly chart performance for "Whoa Is Me"
Chart (2010)	Peak position
Canada (Canadian Hot 100)	13
Canada CHR/Top 40 (Billboard)	15
Canada Hot AC (Billboard)	43

=== Year-end charts ===
Year-end chart performance for "Whoa Is Me"
Chart (2010)	Position
Canada (Canadian Hot 100)	85

== Certifications ==
Certifications and sales for "Whoa Is Me"
Region	Certification	Certified units/sales
Canada (Music Canada)	2× Platinum	160,000^{*}
^{*} Sales figures based on certification alone.
