= Time to Win, Vol. I =

Time to Win, Vol. 1

EP by Down with Webster
- Released: October 6, 2009
- Genre: Rap rock
- Length: 24:38
- Label: Universal Motown / Universal Music
- Producer: Demacio "Demo" Castellon; Down with Webster; James Robertson

Down with Webster chronology
Down with Webster (2007)	Time to Win, Vol. 1 (2009)	Time to Win, Vol. 2 (2011)

Singles from Time to Win, Vol. 1
- 1. "Rich Girl$" Released: October 6, 2009; 2. "Your Man" Released: January 20, 2010; 3. "Whoa Is Me" Released: June 15, 2010

Time to Win, Vol. 1 is the first official EP from the Canadian band, Down with Webster. It released October 6, 2009, on Universal Motown. The album was successful in Canada, all three singles off the album charted in the top 25 on the Canadian Hot 100 and all three were certified Platinum. The album has sold over 40,000 copies in Canada and was certified Gold in December 2010.

== Background and recording ==
The band said the reason to release "Time to Win" in two separate volumes was because: "There is no point in releasing music the way band's used to: the album is dead. 'Time to Win' is a new type of album. We're contently writing new songs and the idea of not being able to put them out seems absurd, so we've been able to work out a system with our label where we are able to put out smaller amounts of songs for less money."

The majority of Time to Win, Vol. 1 was recorded at Chill Ville Studios, Toronto. Additional recording happened at The Hit Factory Criteria, Miami. The album was mixed at various locations such as The Orange Lounge, Toronto and South Beach Studios, Miami. Time to Win, Vol. 1 was mastered at Sterling Sound, New York City.

The album mainly has new songs except for "Miracle Mile", which was also on the band's self-released album and included on Universal Motowns insistence.

James Robertson, Demacio Castellon and Down with Webster produced all of the tracks. Down with Webster had worked with Robertson previously on their self released debut studio album in 2007.

== Release and promotion ==
"Back of My Hand" was released digitally on July 7, 2009, as the first promotional single from the album. "Time to Win" was released later that year as the second promotional single from the album.

Time to Win, Vol. 1 was released on October 6, 2009. A CD release concert was performed in October, 2009 at the Phoenix Concert Theatre in Toronto.

'WINtour 2010' was Down with Webster's first headlining tour. It took place from January to February 2010 and supported Time to Win, Vol. 1. Down with Webster also opened for Forever the Sickest Kids (in the Cheap Date Tour), Timbaland (in the Shock Value II Tour) and 3OH!3 (in the Streets of Gold tour) to support the album.

== Commercial performance ==
The album's lead single, "Rich Girl$" was released in October 6, 2009, and peaked at No. 21 on the Canadian Hot 100. It was also certified Platinum in Canada in April 2010. In the United States it was added over 20 times in one week and was played on over 60 Contemporary Hit Radio stations. "Your Man" was released as the second single and is the most successful single to date. It was released on January 20, 2010, and peaked at No. 12 on the Canadian Hot 100 and was also certified Platinum in Canada in April 2010. "Whoa Is Me" was released as the album's third single on June 15, 2010. It peaked at No. 13 on the Canadian Hot 100. It was certified Platinum in Canada in January 2011.

The album sold over the 40,000 copies in Canada and certified Gold. All three singles ("Your Man", "Rich Girl$", and "Whoa Is Me") have been certified platinum singles in Canada, with "Your Man" and "Rich Girl$" having over 40,000 digital downloads and "Whoa Is Me" having over 80,000 digital downloads.

== Reception ==
Time to Win, Vol. I was met with generally positive reviews from music critics. Ben Packard of Rock Wire called the EP "one of the most solid records of the year," praising the group's beats and vocals as "something you just can't ignore." The first track "Time to Win" was described as the "perfect opening for the album" with its "incredibly catchy" production. He approved of "Whoa Is Me"'s "incredible mix of beats and guitar shredding", and vocal transitions between the band members on "Your Man". Packard opined that "Parade Music" is the most "'hip hop' type of song" on the album and complimented the guitar solo. However, he found "Miracle Mile" to be strange and monotonous . "Rich Girl$" was described by Aryeh Carni of eatsleepbreathemusic.com as having a "cheesy 80's sound like Eddie Money and it's got that guilty pleasure hook to go along [with it]". On "Back of my Hand", she compared it to Eminem's "Stan" due to the sound of "rainstorms and keys" being heard in the intro. She commended the band for showcasing their sense of humour and nonchalant attitude in their music. In addition, Carni noted their use of "beats and samples, heavy guitars and clever lyrical games" on the album. In a retrospective review of the EP, Mala Mortensa of Alternative Press labelled it as one of the most "underrated albums from the 2000s" and described it as "catchy and anthemic in the very best ways."

The EP was nominated for Pop Album of the Year at the Juno Awards of 2011 which took place on March 27, 2011.

== Track listing ==
All of the songs were produced by Down with Webster and James Robertson except where noted.

Time To Win, Vol. 1
No.	Title	Writer(s)	Length
1.	"Time To Win"	Tyler Armes, Andrew Martino, Patrick Gillett, Cameron Hunter, Martin Seja	2:50
2.	"Whoa Is Me"	T. Armes, A. Martino, P. Gillett, C. Hunter, M. Seja	3:43
3.	"Your Man" (Co-produced by Demacio Castellon)	T. Armes, A. Martino, P. Gillett, C. Hunter, M. Seja, Edyth Wayne, Ronald Dunbar	2:48
4.	"Rich Girl$" (Co-produced by Demacio Castellon)	T. Armes, A. Martino, P. Gillett, C. Hunter, M. Seja, Daryl Hall	3:40
5.	"Miracle Mile"	T. Armes, A. Martino, P. Gillett, C. Hunter, M. Seja, Arthur Freed, Nacio Herb Brown	3:39
6.	"Back of My Hand" (Also produced by Demacio Castellon)	T. Armes, A. Martino, P. Gillett, C. Hunter, M. Seja	4:30
7.	"Parade Music"	T. Armes, A. Martino, P. Gillett, C. Hunter, M. Seja	3:27

Sample credits

- "Your Man" contains a sample of "Girls It Ain't Easy" performed by Honey Cone and written by Ronald Dunbar and Edyth Wayne
- "Rich Girl$" contains elements of "Rich Girl" performed by Hall & Oates and written by Daryl Hall
- "Miracle Mile" contains a sample of "Broadway Melody 1929" performed by Rubino Orchestra, and written by Arthur Freed and Nacio Herb Brown

== Personnel ==
Credits for Time to Win, Vol. 1 adapted from AllMusic.

Down with Webster

- Tyler Armes – bass guitar, keyboards, composer
- Kyle "Kap" Fairlie – hype man
- Dave "Diggy" Ferris – DJ
- Patrick "Pat" Gillett – vocals, guitar, composer
- Cameron "Cam" Hunter – vocals, composer
- Andrew "Marty" Martino – drums, composer
- Martin "Bucky" Seja – vocals, composer

Production

- Down with Webster – producer
- Matt Barnes – photography
- Demacio "Demo" Castellon – executive producer, producer, mixing
- Chris Corless – A&R (Canada)
- Tom Coyne – mastering
- Jason "Metal" Donkersgoed – mixing assistant
- Chris Gehringer – mastering
- Chris Godbey – Pro Tools editing
- Shep Goodman – A&R
- Femio Hernandez – assistant
- Rob Hitt – A&R
- Jordan Jacobs and Ryan Armes (SPYBOX) – management
- Brandon Jones – recording assistant
- Lisa Linder – product manager
- Tom Lord-Alge – mixing
- Steve Nightingale – product manager (Canada)
- James Robertson – producer, recording, mixing
- Fareed Salamah – additional recording
- Julian Vasquez – additional recording
- Dan Warner – additional guitar

== Charts ==
Chart performance for Time to Win, Vol. 1
Chart (2010)	Peak position
Canadian Albums (Billboard)	50

== Certifications ==
Certifications for Time to Win, Vol 1
Region	Certification	Certified units/sales
Canada (Music Canada)	Gold	40,000^{^}
^{^} Shipments figures based on certification alone.
