= ITunes Session =

iTunes Sessions are a series of live albums and extended plays (EPs) recorded by various artists and released exclusively through the iTunes Store. They are a companion series to iTunes Originals.

Notable EPs released as part of this promotion include:

- iTunes Session (Gorillaz EP), 2010
- iTunes Session (Lady Antebellum EP), 2010
- iTunes Session (Shinedown EP), 2010
- iTunes Session (Beach House EP), 2010
- iTunes Session (Kelly Clarkson EP), 2011
- iTunes Session (The Decemberists EP), 2011
- iTunes Session (Wilco EP), 2012
- iTunes Session (Matt Corby EP), 2012
- iTunes Session (Imagine Dragons EP), 2013
- iTunes Session (Chet Faker EP), 2014
- iTunes Session (Jessica Mauboy EP), 2014

Other bands who have recorded EPs with this name, ordered by release date:

- Yeah Yeah Yeahs, Jan 1, 2006
- Diplo, Jul 2, 2007
- Supergrass, Aug 29, 2008
- Colbie Caillat, Jan 1, 2009
- Kate Voegele, Jan 1, 2009
- Blind Pilot, Dec 29, 2009
- Taio Cruz, Jan 1, 2010
- Gin Wigmore, Jan 1, 2010
- The Mumlers, Jan 19, 2010
- YACHT, Feb 9, 2010
- Fanfarlo, Feb 12, 2010
- Billy Talent, Feb 16, 2010
- Lykke Li, Feb 28, 2010
- suzumoku, Mar 24, 2010
- Joshua James, Jun 15, 2010
- Angel Taylor, Jul 20, 2010
- Beach House, Aug 24, 2010
- Switchfoot, Aug 30, 2010
- Diane Birch, Sep 1, 2010
- Train, Sep 7, 2010
- A Flood of Circle, Sep 8, 2010
- Black Rebel Motorcycle Club, Sep 14, 2010
- Angus & Julia Stone, Sep 28, 2010
- Great Lake Swimmers, Sep 28, 2010
- Brad, Oct 5, 2010
- The Black Keys, Oct 19, 2010
- Great Big Sea, Oct 19, 2010
- Ozomatli, Nov 2, 2010
- Skillet, Nov 12, 2010
- Edward Sharpe & The Magnetic Zeros, Nov 30, 2010
- Vampire Weekend, Dec 21, 2010
- Karkwa, Dec 21, 2010
- Grace Potter and The Nocturnals, Jan 1, 2011
- PJ Harvey, Jan 1, 2011
- Metric, Jan 4, 2011
- Matt Mays, Jan 11, 2011
- Maroon 5, Feb 8, 2011
- Winter Gloves, Feb 22, 2011
- Shad, Mar 1, 2011
- Natalie Merchant, Mar 10, 2011
- Cobra Starship, Aug 23, 2011
- Papa vs Pretty, Oct 28, 2011
- The Wailin' Jennys, Nov 1, 2011
- Gavin DeGraw, Nov 18, 2011
- The Head and The Heart, Nov 29, 2011
- Elizaveta, Jan 1, 2012
- Mayer Hawthorne, Jan 1, 2012
- Wilco, Jan 20,2012
- Ryan Adams, Apr 24, 2012
- B.o.B, May 1, 2012
- Passenger, Jun 29, 2012
- Mat Kearney, Aug 3, 2012
- First Aid Kit, Sep 11, 2012
- Dispatch, Dec 4, 2012
- fun., Dec 10, 2012
- Tenth Avenue North, Dec 14, 2012
- Ellie Goulding, Jan 1, 2013
- Phillip Phillips, Jan 1, 2013
- Zedd, Jan 1, 2013
- Bahamas, Jan 1, 2013
- Frank Turner, Jan 1, 2013
- Ben l'Oncle Soul, Jan 1, 2013
- Alabama Shakes, Feb 5, 2013
- Lights, Apr 2, 2013
- Gary Clark Jr., Apr 5, 2013
- alt-J, Apr 16, 2013
- Jimmy Eat World, Jul 22, 2013
- Joey Yung, Aug 6, 2013
- Skylar Grey, Oct 15, 2013
- Hannah Georgas, Oct 22, 2013
- Local Natives, Nov 5, 2013
- Walk off the Earth, Nov 22, 2013
- My Morning Jacket, Dec 6, 2013
- Third Day, Dec 13, 2013
- Florida Georgia Line, Jan 14, 2014
- José González, Mar 1, 2014
- Basia Bulat, Mar 18, 2014
- Mumiy Troll, Mar 24, 2014
- Basta, Apr 14, 2014
- Caetano Veloso, Apr 24, 2014
- Lindi Ortega, Jun 17, 2014
- JJ Lin, Jul 18, 2014
- OneRepublic, Jul 22, 2014
- Pakho Chau, Sep 2, 2014
- Teesy, Oct 3, 2014
- Fat Freddy's Drop, Dec 9, 2014
- Shiga Lin, Dec 16, 2014
- Neil Finn, Feb 6, 2015
- Christine and the Queens, Feb 9, 2015
- Adam Tas, Feb 13, 2015
- Li Ronghao, Feb 17, 2015
- Matthew Mole, Mar 2, 2015
- Ayaka, Mar 16, 2015
- Kodaline, Jun 26, 2015
- The Weepies, May 5, 2017
