= 2011 MuchMusic Video Awards =

Annual edition of the awards show

- Date: June 19, 2011
- Location: 299 Queen Street West
- Country: Canada
- Hosted by: Selena Gomez
- Website: http://mmva.muchmusic.com

Television/radio coverage
- Network: MuchMusic; Fuse (US)

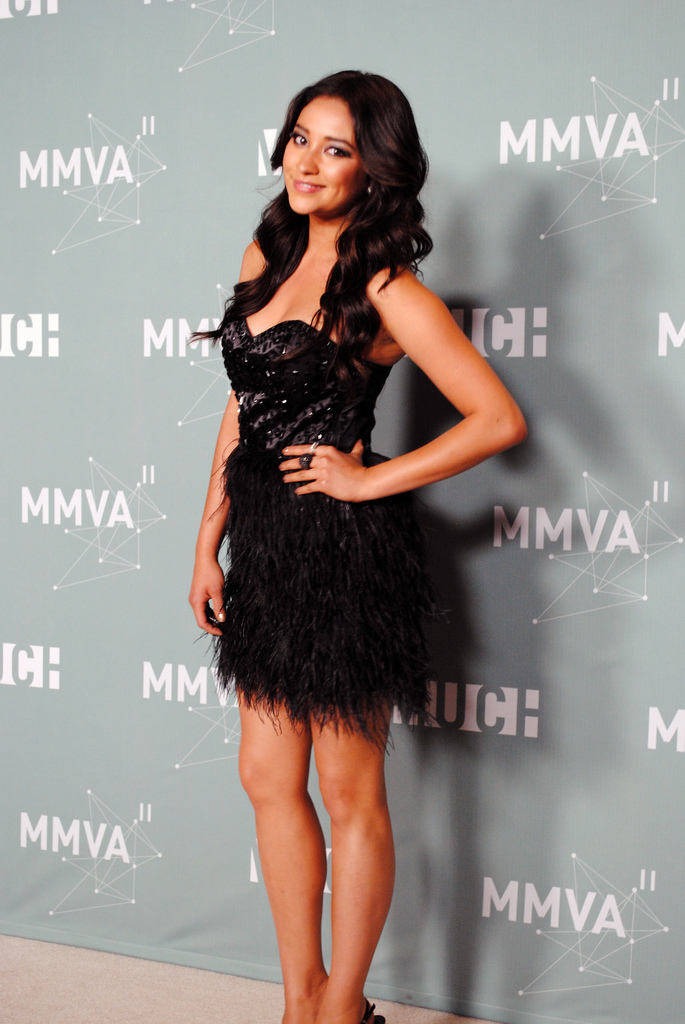
Shay Mitchell attending the 2011 MuchMusic Video Awards on June 19, 2011.

The 2011 MuchMusic Video Awards was held in Toronto, Ontario, Canada at MuchMusic's headquarters on June 19, 2011. The awards were aired on MuchMusic, CP24, E!, MuchHD and Fuse. Along with the MuchMusic VJ's, it was confirmed on the MuchMusic website that Selena Gomez will host the show. Lady Gaga and Justin Bieber tied for the most awards won with 2 each.

== Winners and nominees ==
Nominees for the People's Choice awards were announced in early May 2011. One "wildcard" nominee will be chosen in each of the "UR Fave" award categories (as voted by the Much Music viewers). The nominees were, with the winners in bold:

=== Video of the Year ===
- **Shawn Desman — "Electric/Night Like This"**
- Blake McGrath — "Relax"
- Danny Fernandes f. Belly — "Automatic"
- Down With Webster — "Whoa Is Me"
- Fefe Dobson — "Ghost"

=== Post Production of the Year ===
- **Danny Fernandes f. Belly — "Automatic"**
- Broken Social Scene — "Forced to Love"
- Candy Coated Killahz — "Neon Black"
- K'naan — "Take a Minute"
- These Kids Wear Crowns — "Jumpstart"

=== Cinematographer of the Year ===
- **Blake McGrath — "Relax"**
- JDiggz f. Neverending White Lights – "This Time"
- Kaskade f. Dragonette – "Fire In Your New Shoes"
- Stereos – "Uncontrollable"
- Neverest – "Everything"

=== Director of the Year ===
- **You Say Party – "Lonely's Lunch" Director: Sean Wainsteim**
- Abandon All Ships – "Geeving" Director: Davin Black
- JDiggz f. Neverending White Lights – "This Time" Director: RT!
- Marianas Trench f. Jessica Lee – "Good to You" Director: Colin Minihan
- Shawn Desman — "Electric/Night Like This" Director: RT!

=== Pop Video of the Year ===
- **Down With Webster – "Whoa Is Me"**
- Alyssa Reid f. P. Reign – "Alone Again"
- Fefe Dobson – "Ghost"
- Marianas Trench f. Jessica Lee – "Good to You"
- Shawn Desman — "Electric/Night Like This"

=== MuchLOUD Rock Video of the Year ===
- **Abandon All Ships – "Geeving"**
- Billy Talent – "Diamond on a Landmine"
- Hail the Villain – "Runaway"
- Metric – "Stadium Love"
- Simple Plan f. Rivers Cuomo – "Can't Keep My Hands Off You"

=== MuchVIBE Hip-hop Video of the Year ===
- **Classified – "That Ain't Classy"**
- Belly f. Kobe – "Back Against The Wall"
- K'naan — "Take a Minute"
- P. Reign – "Call My Name"
- Shad – "Rose Garden"

=== MuchFACT Indie Video of the Year ===
- **JDiggz f. Neverending White Lights – "This Time"**
- JRDN – "Like Magic"
- Metric – "Stadium Love"
- Tokyo Police Club – "Wait Up (Boots of Danger)"
- You Say Party – "Lonely's Lunch"

=== International Video of the Year – Artist ===
- **Lady Gaga – "Judas"**
- Bruno Mars – "Just the Way You Are"
- David Guetta f. Rihanna - "Who's That Chick"
- Eminem f. Rihanna – "Love the Way You Lie"
- Katy Perry f. Kanye West – "E.T."
- Kanye West f. Pusha T – "Runaway"
- Rihanna – "Only Girl (In The World)"
- Britney Spears – "Till The World Ends"
- Jennifer Lopez f. Pitbull – "On The Floor"
- Selena Gomez & The Scene - "A Year Without Rain"

=== International Video of the Year – Group ===
- **Far East Movement f. The Cataracs, Dev – "Like a G6"**
- The Black Eyed Peas – "The Time (Dirty Bit)"
- Diddy-Dirty Money – "Coming Home"
- The Black Keys – "Tighten Up"
- White Lies – "Bigger than Us"

=== International Video of the Year by a Canadian ===
- **Tie: Drake – "Find Your Love" and Justin Bieber ft. Usher – "Somebody to Love (Remix)"**
- Arcade Fire – "The Suburbs"
- Avril Lavigne – "What the Hell"
- Fefe Dobson – "Stuttering"

=== MuchMUSIC.COM Most Watched Video ===
- **Taio Cruz - "Dynamite"**
- Adam Lambert – "If I Had You"
- B.o.B ft. Hayley Williams - "Airplanes"
- Beyoncé - "Why Don't You Love Me"
- Bruno Mars – "Just the Way You Are"
- Christina Aguilera - "Not Myself Tonight"
- Drake ft. Lil Wayne - "Miss Me"
- Drake - "Find Your Love"
- Eminem ft. Lil Wayne - "No Love"
- Edward Maya ft. Vika Jigulina- "Stereo Love"
- Eminem ft. Rihanna – "Love the Way You Lie"
- Justin Bieber ft. Usher – "Somebody To Love (Remix)"
- Katy Perry ft. Snoop Dogg – "California Gurls"
- Katy Perry – "Teenage Dream"
- Kesha – "Your Love Is My Drug"
- Kesha – "Take It Off"
- Lady Gaga – "Alejandro"
- Marianas Trench ft. Jessica Lee – "Good To You"
- Nelly – "Just A Dream"
- P!nk – "Raise Your Glass"
- Rihanna – "Only Girl (In The World)"
- Selena Gomez and the Scene – "A Year Without Rain"
- Taylor Swift– "Mine"
- Usher ft. Pitbull – "DJ Got Us Fallin' in Love"
- Avril Lavigne - "Smile"

=== UR Fave: Video ===
- **Fefe Dobson - "Stuttering"**
- Down With Webster - "Whoa Is Me"
- Shawn Desman - "Electric/Night Like This"
- Danny Fernandes f. Belly - "Automatic"
- (Wildcard Winner) These Kids Wear Crowns - "Jumpstart"

=== UR Fave: International Video ===
- **Lady Gaga — "Born This Way"**
- Bruno Mars — "Just the Way You Are"
- Eminem ft. Rihanna — "Love The Way You Lie"
- Selena Gomez — "A Year Without Rain"
- Britney Spears - "Till The World Ends"

=== UR Fave: Artist ===
- **Justin Bieber ft. Usher — "Somebody to Love (Remix)"**
- Arcade Fire — "The Suburbs"
- Avril Lavigne — "What The Hell"
- Drake — "Find Your Love"
- Down With Webster - "Whoa Is Me" (Wildcard Winner)

== Performers ==
The following performances are in chronological order.

- Lady Gaga - The Edge of Glory
- Far East Movement featuring Dev and Snoop Dogg - Like a G6, If I Was You (OMG), & Bass Down Low
- Down With Webster - She's Dope
- Fefe Dobson - Stuttering
- The Black Keys - Howlin' for You
- Avril Lavigne - What the Hell
- Simple Plan featuring Fefe Dobson - Jet Lag
- Selena Gomez & The Scene - Who Says
- City and Colour - Fragile Bird
- Bruno Mars - Just the Way You Are
- Lady Gaga - Born This Way

== Appearances ==
- Foster The People
- Nikki Reed
- Ian Somerhalder
- Nina Dobrev
- Shay Mitchell
- Johnny Galecki
- These Kids Wear Crowns
- Shawn Desman
- Marianas Trench (band)
- Munro Chambers
- Cody Simpson
- Classified
- Blake McGrath
- Colin Farrell
- Kat Graham
- Justin Bieber
- Trevor Donovan
