= Boi-1da production discography =

The following is a discography of Canadian record producer Boi-1da.

== Singles produced ==
List of singles as either producer or co-producer, with selected chart positions and certifications, showing year released, performing artists and album name
Title	Year	Peak chart positions										Certifications	Album
Title	Year	US	US R&B	US Rap	AUS	CAN	GER	IRL	NZ	SWI	UK	Certifications	Album
"Set It Off" (Kardinal Offishall featuring Clipse)	2008	—	—	—	—	—	—	—	—	—	—		Not 4 Sale
"Best I Ever Had" (Drake)	2009	2	1	1	—	24	—	—	—	—	79	BPI: Silver; RIAA: 4× Platinum	So Far Gone
"Forever" (Drake featuring Kanye West, Lil Wayne and Eminem)	2009	8	2	1	99	26	—	41	—	—	42	BPI: Gold; RIAA: 6× Platinum	More than a Game
"4 My Town (Play Ball)" (Birdman featuring Drake and Lil Wayne)	2009	90	37	17	—	—	—	—	—	—	—		Priceless
"Over" (Drake)	2010	14	2	1	—	17	—	—	—	—	50	RIAA: 3× Platinum	Thank Me Later
"Not Afraid" (Eminem)	2010	1	70	8	4	1	9	3	8	2	5	ARIA: 2× Platinum; IFPI: Gold; RIAA: Diamond; RMNZ: Platinum	Recovery
"Miss Me" (Drake featuring Lil Wayne)	2010	15	3	2	—	72	—	—	—	—	162	RIAA: Platinum	Thank Me Later
"Speakers Going Hammer" (Soulja Boy)	2010	106	47	24	—	—	—	—	—	—	—		The DeAndre Way
"Forgive Me" (Bizzle featuring Jin)	2011	—	—	—	—	—	—	—	—	—	—		Tough Love & Parabels
"Headlines" (Drake)	2011	13	2	1	—	18	—	—	—	—	57	MC: Platinum; BPI: Gold; RIAA: 4× Platinum	Take Care
"Get Low" (Waka Flocka Flame featuring Nicki Minaj, Tyga and Flo Rida)	2012	72	62	25	—	58	—	—	—	—	—		Triple F Life: Friends, Fans & Family
"Goodbye" (Slaughterhouse)	2012	—	49	50	—	—	—	—	—	—	—		Welcome to: Our House
"Turn 'Em Away" (Bizzle)	2012	—	—	—	—	—	—	—	—	—	—		non-album single
"Freedom" (Nicki Minaj)	2012	—	31	23	—	—	—	—	—	—	107		Pink Friday: Roman Reloaded – The Re-Up
"High School" (Nicki Minaj featuring Lil Wayne)	2013	68	22	15	57	81	79	47	—	—	31	RIAA: Gold	Pink Friday: Roman Reloaded – The Re-Up
"No New Friends" (DJ Khaled featuring Drake, Rick Ross and Lil Wayne)	2013	37	9	8	—	—	—	—	—	—	—		Suffering from Success
"My Confession" (Bizzle featuring Sevin)	2013	—	—	—	—	—	—	—	—	—	—		The Good Fight
"I'm a Christian" (Bizzle)	2013	—	—	—	—	—	—	—	—	—	—		The Good Fight
"Chills" (Down With Webster)	2013	—	—	—	—	19	—	—	—	—	—	MC: Platinum	Party For Your Life
"0 to 100 / The Catch Up" (Drake)	2014	35	8	7	—	61	—	—	—	—	68	BPI: Silver; RIAA: 2× Platinum	non-album single
"The Blacker the Berry" (Kendrick Lamar)	2015	66	32	16	—	—	—	—	—	—	83	RIAA: Gold	To Pimp a Butterfly
"Work" (Rihanna featuring Drake)	2016	1	1	—	5	1	22	21	20	24	4	ARIA: 2× Platinum; MC: Gold; IFPI: 2× Platinum; RMNZ: 2× Platinum; BPI: 2× Platinum; RIAA: 6× Platinum	Anti
"Summer Sixteen" (Drake)	2016	6	1	1	25	12	97	89	8	63	23	BPI: Silver; RIAA: Platinum	non-album single
"Regret in Your Tears" (Nicki Minaj)	2017	61	26	—	14	84	—	—	—	—	69		TBA
"No Limit" (G-Eazy featuring ASAP Rocky and Cardi B)	2017	4	—	—	7	—	—	—	—	—	—	ARIA: Platinum; MC: 4× Platinum; RMNZ: Gold; BPI: Silver; RIAA: 5× Platinum	The Beautiful and Damned
"Gods Plan" (Drake)	2018	1	1	1	1	1	1	1	1	1	1		Scorpion
"Lucky You" (Eminem featuring Joyner Lucas)	2018	6	71	—	-	—	—	—	—	—	—		Kamikaze
"Push Ups" (Drake)	2024	17	2	—	37	10	70	20	34	25	14		Non-album single
"Family Matters" (Drake)	2024	7	5	—	26	6	6	92	16	32	17		Non-album single
"Electric Circus" (Nelly Furtado featuring Boi-1da and Canada Soccer)	2026	—	—	—	—	—	—	—	—	—	—		What If It All Goes Right?
"—" denotes a recording that did not chart or was not released in that territory.

== 2006 ==
=== Keshia Chanté – 2U ===
- 13. "Been Gone" (Boi 1da Remix)

=== Drake – Room for Improvement ===
- 04. "Do What You Do"
- 07. "City Is Mine"

=== Nickelus F – How to Build a Buzz for Dummies ===
- 24. "Stop Think"

== 2007 ==
=== Drake – Comeback Season ===
- 05. "Replacement Girl" (featuring Trey Songz) (Produced with T-Minus)
- 11. "Don't U Have a Man" (featuring Dwele and Little Brother) (Produced with D10)
- 16. "Do What U Do (Remix)" (featuring Malice and Nickelus F)

== 2008 ==
=== Manafest – Citizens Activ ===
- 05. "Free"

=== Point Blank – Point Blank ===
- 14. "Sensitive Thugs"

=== Kardinal Offishall – Not 4 Sale ===
- 02. "Set It Off" (featuring Clipse)
- 05. "Gimme Some" (featuring The-Dream)
- 12. "Bring the Fire Out"
- 15. "Lighter!"

=== Drake ===
- 00. "Look at the Ice" (featuring Nickelus F)

=== G-Unit – Elephant in the Sand ===
- 04. "Red Light, Green Light"

=== Page ===
- 00. "Still Fly" (featuring Drake)

=== Lil' Wayne – The Leak V ===
- 00. Ransom (featuring Drake)

== 2009 ==
=== Fast Life Yungstaz – Jamboree ===
- 10. "Sauced Up" (Produced with DJ Spinz and FRESH)
- 12. "Stop Hatin' 09" (Produced with Key Wane)

=== Miles Jones – Runaway Jones ===
- 04. "Never Wrong"

=== Drake – So Far Gone ===
- 03. "Best I Ever Had"
  - Sample Credit: "Fallin' in Love" by Hamilton, Joe Frank & Reynolds
- 04. "Uptown" (featuring Bun B and Lil Wayne) (Produced with Arthur McArthur)
  - Sample Credit: "Uptown Girl" by Billy Joel

=== Nickelus F – Heathen ===
- 00. "Woo Sah"

=== Jazzfeezy – Jazzfeezy Presents: Unveiling the Rapture ===
- 04. "Words Won't Do" (Produced with Jazzfeezy and T-Minus)
- 10. "Story to Tell" (featuring Burna, Red Shortz and Regular Robb) (Produced with Jazzfeezy)

=== King Reign – Reign Music ===
- 03. "This Means War"

=== Drake – More than a Game ===
- 02. "Forever" (with Kanye West, Lil Wayne and Eminem)

=== Birdman – Priceless ===
- 08. "4 My Town (Play Ball)" (featuring Drake and Lil Wayne)
- 11. "Mo Milli" (featuring Bun B and Drake)
- 15. "Ball Till Ya Fall" (featuring Gucci Mane) (Deluxe Edition Bonus Track)

=== Eminem – Relapse: Refill ===
- 01. "Forever" (with Drake, Kanye West and Lil Wayne)

=== Chip tha Ripper – The Cleveland Show ===
- 02. "Movie"

=== Young Jeezy ===
- 00. "Scared Money" (featuring Lil Wayne)

=== Jahvon ===
- 00. "Class In Session"

== 2010 ==
=== Red Café ===
- 00. "I'm Ill" (featuring Fabolous)
- 00. "I'm Ill (Remix)" (featuring Ryan Leslie, Lloyd Banks and Claudette Ortiz)

=== Rick Ross – The Albert Anastasia EP ===
- 04. "Money Maker"
  - Sample Credit: "Bring It Back" by Lil Wayne

=== Drake – Thank Me Later ===
- 01. "Fireworks" (featuring Alicia Keys) (Produced with Noah "40" Shebib and Crada)
- 04. "Over" (Produced with Noah "40" Shebib and Al-Khaaliq)
- 06. "Up All Night" (featuring Nicki Minaj) (Produced with Matthew Burnett)
- 09. "Unforgettable" (featuring Young Jeezy) (Produced with Noah "40" Shebib)
  - Sample Credit: "At Your Best (You Are Love)" by Aaliyah
- 11. "Miss Me" (featuring Lil Wayne) (Produced with Noah "40" Shebib)
  - Sample Credit: "Wild Flower" by Hank Crawford
- 16. "9AM in Dallas" (UK iTunes bonus track)

=== Eminem – Recovery ===
- 07. "Not Afraid" (Produced with Eminem, Matthew Burnett and Jordan Evans)
- 08. "Seduction" (Produced with Matthew Burnett)

=== Big Boi ===
- 00. "Lookin' for Ya" (featuring André 3000 and Sleepy Brown)

=== Stat Quo – Statlanta ===
- 06. "Catch Me" (Produced with Northern Profit)
- 12. "Penthouse Condo" (Produced with Mike Chav)

=== Bun B – Trill OG ===
- 04. "Put It Down" (featuring Drake)
- 16. "It's Been a Pleasure" (featuring Drake)

=== Diggy Simmons – Airborne ===
- 06. "Super Hero Music" (featuring Raekwon)

=== Das Racist – Sit Down, Man ===
- 04. "hahahaha jk?"

=== Skeme – Pistols and Palm Trees ===
- 04. "Chuck Taylors"
- 09. "Til' I'm Gone" (featuring Kendrick Lamar)

=== King Reign – Reign Music ===
- 03. "This Means War"

=== Lil Wayne – I Am Not a Human Being ===
- 10. "Bill Gates" (Produced with Matthew Burnett)

=== Rebstar – Arrival ===
- 13. "Dead or Alive"

=== Pimp C – The Naked Soul of Sweet Jones ===
- 02. "What Up?" (featuring Bun B and Drake)

=== Cassidy – C.A.S.H. ===
- 13. "Peace"

=== Nickelus F – Commercials Mixtape ===
- 04. "Go Head"

=== Lloyd Banks – H.F.M. 2 (Hunger for More 2) ===
- 17. "Where I'm At" (featuring Eminem) (Produced with Matthew Burnett) (iTunes bonus track)

=== Flo Rida – Only One Flo (Part 1) ===
- 05. "21" (featuring Laza Morgan) (Produced with Polow da Don)

=== Soulja Boy – The DeAndre Way ===
- 04. "Speakers Going Hammer"

=== Keri Hilson – No Boys Allowed ===
- 01. "Buyou" (featuring J. Cole) (Produced with Matthew Burnett, Bei Maejor and Polow da Don)
- 10. "Gimme What I Want" (Produced with Matthew Burnett)
- 16. "Fearless" (Japan bonus track)

=== Rick Ross – Ashes to Ashes ===
- 04. "Black Man's Dream" (featuring Ludacris)

=== Kent Money – Becoming ===
- 10. "See What I Did"

== 2011 ==
=== Nicole Scherzinger – Killer Love ===
- 13. "Casualty" (Additional production by The Maven Boys)

=== Tinie Tempah – Disc-Overy ===
- 06. "So Addicted" (featuring Bei Maejor) (Produced with Bei Maejor)

=== Rebstar ===
- 00. "Good Life" (featuring Drake and Rock City)

=== Bizzle – Tough Love & Parabels ===
- 19. "Forgive Me" (featuring Jin)

=== Big Lean – Something Gotta Give ===
- 01. Something Gotta Give (featuring OVO Hush)
- 05. Sufferin' (featuring Sizzla)
- 06. You Got It Good
- 08. Stay A While (Featuring Jeremy Thurber)
- 09. I Wanna Know
- 10. Monsters In My Head (Featuring Yikes)

=== Big Sean – Finally Famous ===
- 15. "My House" (Produced with Arthur McArthur) (Deluxe Edition Bonus Track)
  - Sample Credit: "Ain't There Something Money Can't Buy" by Young-Holt Unlimited

=== DJ Khaled – We the Best Forever ===
- 08. "Can't Stop" (featuring Birdman and T-Pain) (Produced with Matthew Burnett)
- 09. "Future" (featuring Ace Hood, Meek Mill, Big Sean, Wale and Vado)

=== Game – Hoodmorning (No Typo) ===
- 05. "Monsters In My Head"

=== Game – The R.E.D. Album ===
- 17. "All I Know" (Produced with Peb Rocks and Big Kast)

=== Gilbere Forte - "Eyes Of Veritas" ===
- 13. "Time Life" featuring REE$E

=== Mindless Behavior – Number 1 Girl ===
- 08. "Future" (produced with Matthew Burnett)

=== Down with Webster – Time to Win, Vol. 2 ===
- 02. "Professional" (Additional production by Megaman)
- 07. "I Want It All" (Additional production by Matthew Burnett)

=== Slim the Mobster – War Music ===
- 08. "Whose House?" (featuring Kendrick Lamar)
  - Sample Credit: "Ain't There Something Money Can't Buy" by Young-Holt Unlimited

=== Drake – Take Care ===
- 03. "Headlines" (Additional Production by Noah "40" Shebib)

=== Starlito and Don Trip – Step Brothers ===
- 02. "Chase That Money"
- 07. "In Her Mouth" (Produced with Jazzfeezy)

=== Ace Hood – The Statement 2 ===
- 14. "Emergency" (featuring Mavado)

== 2012 ==
=== Rick Ross – Rich Forever ===
- 03. "MMG Untouchable" (Produced with Arthur McArthur)
- 17. "MMG The World Is Ours" (featuring Pharrell, Meek Mill and Stalley) (Produced with Vinylz)

=== Chip tha Ripper – Tell Ya Friends ===
- 08. "25 Wives" (featuring Wale)

=== Tyga – Careless World: Rise of the Last King ===
- 06. "I'm Gone" (featuring Big Sean)

=== Alley Boy – Nigganati ===
- 07. "Countless"

=== Game – California Republic ===
- 18. "Come Up" (featuring Drake and LifeStyle) (Produced with Arthur McArthur)

=== Lecrae – Church Clothes ===
- 13. "Gimme A Second"

=== Crooked I – Psalm 82:V6 ===
- 04. "Monsters in My Head" (featuring Slaughterhouse and Colin Munroe)

=== Maybach Music Group – Self Made Vol. 2 ===
- 07. "I Be Puttin' On" (Wale (featuring Wiz Khalifa, French Montana and Roscoe Dash) (Produced with The Maven Boys)

=== Chris Brown – Fortune ===
- 12. "Party Hard / Cadillac (Interlude)" (featuring Sevyn) (Produced with Brian Kennedy)

=== Childish Gambino – Royalty ===
- 04. "Black Faces" (featuring Nipsey Hussle) (Produced with The Maven Boys)
- 16. "Wonderful" (featuring Josh Osho)

=== Nas – Life Is Good ===
- 19. "Trust" (iTunes Store bonus track)

=== Roscoe Dash – 2.0 ===
- 08. "Like Diz" (featuring 2 Chainz) (Produced with Vinylz)

=== D-Why – Don't Flatter Yourself ===
- 02. "Hawaii"

=== Busta Rhymes – Year of the Dragon ===
- 09. "Sound Boy" (featuring Cam'ron)

=== DJ Khaled – Kiss the Ring ===
- 11. "Suicidal Thoughts" (featuring Mavado)

=== Trey Songz – Chapter V ===
- 10. "Bad Decisions" (Produced with Rico Love)

=== Slaughterhouse – Welcome to: Our House ===
- 13. "Goodbye" (Produced with Eminem and Matthew Burnett)
- 16. "Our Way (Outro)" (Produced with Eminem and The Maven Boys)

=== Talib Kweli – Attack the Block ===
- 06. "Outstanding" (featuring Ryan Leslie)

=== Kirko Bangz – Procrastination Kills 4 ===
- 02. "Hold It Down" (featuring Young Jeezy)

=== T-Pain – Stoic ===
- 01. "The Champ" (featuring Tay Dizm)

=== DJ Drama – Quality Street Music ===
- 01. "Goin' Down" (featuring Fabolous, T-Pain and Yo Gotti)
- 05. "So Many Girls" (featuring Wale, Tyga and Roscoe Dash)

=== MGK – Lace Up ===
- 10. "Runnin'" (featuring Planet VI) (Produced with Jazzfeezy)

=== Meek Mill – Dreams & Nightmares ===
- 04. "Traumatized"
- 10. "Tony Story (Pt. 2)"

=== Don Trip – Help Is On The Way ===
- 09. "All on Me"

=== French Montana – Mac & Cheese 3 ===
- 10. "Don't Go Over There" (featuring Fat Joe and Wale)

=== Nicki Minaj – Pink Friday: Roman Reloaded – The Re-Up ===
- 01. "Up In Flames" (Produced with The Maven Boys)
- 02. "Freedom" (Produced with Matthew Burnett)
- 04. "High School" (featuring Lil Wayne) (Produced with T-Minus)

=== The Game – Jesus Piece ===
- 09. "See No Evil" (featuring Kendrick Lamar and Tank) (Produced with Matthew Burnett)

=== JoJo – Agápē ===
- 13. "Can't Handle The Truth"

== 2013 ==
=== Rockie Fresh – Electric Highway ===
- 06. "Life Long" (featuring Rick Ross and Nipsey Hussle) (produced with The Maven Boys)

=== Joe Budden – No Love Lost ===
- 04. "NBA" (featuring Wiz Khalifa and French Montana) (Produced with Vinylz)

=== Big Lean – Can't Stop Now ===
- 12. "Run It" (featuring Andreena Mill)

=== Bizzle – The Good Fight ===
- 01. "Lead Me" (featuring Willie Moore Jr.)
- 03. "Do It Again" (featuring Willie Moore Jr.)
- 04. "Think 4 A Minute"
- 05. "Dear Hip Hop"
- 06. "You Know"
- 08. "Against You"
- 09. "The Way" (featuring Haley Hunt)
- 10. "Make Her The Mrs."
- 11. "I'm A Christian" (co-produced with The Maven Boys)
- 15. "Tomorrow (No Win)"
- 16. "My Confession" (featuring Sevin)
- 19. "Not Alone" (featuring Nina Sims)
- 20. "Better Way Pt.2 (Tribute To Sandy Hook)" (Produced with Vinylz) (Bonus Track)
- 21. "Wonder" (Bonus Track)

=== Talib Kweli – Prisoner of Conscious ===
- 16. "Outstanding" (featuring Ryan Leslie) (iTunes Bonus)

=== Kelly Rowland – Talk a Good Game ===
- 09. "Red Wine" (Produced with Matthew Burnett and Kevin Cossom)

=== Daniel de Bourg – London Bread ===
- 02. "Brink of Amazing" (Produced with Vinylz)

=== Tinashe – Black Water ===
- 03. "Vulnerable" (Produced with Vinylz)

=== Iggy Azalea – The New Classic ===
- 00. "Picture Me Rollin'" (unreleased)

=== Jay-Z – Magna Carta... Holy Grail ===
- 04. "FuckWithMeYouKnowIGotIt" (featuring Rick Ross) (Produced with Vinylz & Timbaland)

=== Ace Hood – Trials & Tribulations ===
- 06. "We Them Niggas

=== Drake – Nothing Was the Same ===
- 10. "The Language" (Produced with Vinylz)
- 13. "Pound Cake" featuring Jay-Z

=== DJ Khaled – Suffering from Success ===
- 09. "No New Friends (featuring Drake, Rick Ross and Lil Wayne)" (produced with Noah "40" Shebib)

=== Lecrae – Church Clothes 2 ===
- 08. "Lost My Way" (featuring King Mez and Daniel Day) (produced with Mike DZL)

=== Vic Mensa – INNANETAPE ===
- 07. "Time Is Money" (featuring Rockie Fresh) (produced with The Maven Boys)

=== Trae tha Truth – I Am King ===
- 00. "Ride Wit Me" (featuring Meek Mill and T.I.)

=== Down With Webster – Party For Your Life ===
- 03. "Chills" (produced with The Maven Boys)

== 2014 ==
=== Lil Wayne – Tha Carter V ===
- "Believe Me" (co-produced with Vinylz)"
- "Grindin'" (co-produced with Vinylz)"

=== Schoolboy Q – Oxymoron ===
- 17. "Yay Yay" (co-produced with The Maven Boys)

=== Mobb Deep – The Infamous Mobb Deep ===
- 07. "Low" (featuring Mack Wilds) (co-produced with Sevn Thomas and Havoc)
- 11. "Legendary" (featuring Bun B and Juicy J) (co-produced with Havoc and The Maven Boys)

=== Drake ===
- "0 to 100 / The Catch Up" (co-produced with Frank Dukes and Vinylz)"
- "How Bout Now" (co-produced with Jordan Evans)

=== P. Reign – Dear America ===
- 14. "Realest In The City" featuring Meek Mill and PARTYNEXTDOOR (co-produced with The Maven Boys)

=== Tinashe – Aquarius ===
- 03. "Cold Sweat" (co-produced with Syk Sense and Sango)

=== Astro – Computer Era ===
- "Just Dreamin" (Additional production by Bass Line)
- "Nigga Pls" (Additional production by Matthew Burnett)

=== Nicki Minaj – The Pinkprint ===
- 01. "All Things Go" (co-produced with Vinylz)"

== 2015 ==
=== Kendrick Lamar – To Pimp a Butterfly ===
- 13. "The Blacker the Berry"

=== Drake – If You're Reading This It's Too Late ===
- 02. "Energy" (co-produced with OB O'Brien)
- 03. "10 Bands" (co-produced with Sevn Thomas)
- 04. "Know Yourself" (co-produced with Vinylz and Syk Sense)
- 05. "No Tellin'" (co-produced with Frank Dukes)
- 07. "6 God" (co-produced with Syk Sense)
- 15. "You & the 6" (co-produced with 40 and Illmind)
- 17. "6PM in New York" (co-produced with Frank Dukes, Bobby White and Sevn Thomas)

=== Big Lean – Enough Is Enough ===
- 02. "Everyday"
- 03. "Bounce Back" (co-produced with ZALE)
- 04. "California Water" (Featuring Nipsey Hussle)
- 05. "Enough Is Enough"
- 06. "Benjamins" (Featuring Juelz Santana)
- 09. "Ventilation"
- 10. "Eyes on Me" (co-produced with 2Epik)
- 14. "I Need More"

=== Big Sean – Dark Sky Paradise ===
- 02. "Blessings" (featuring Drake) (co-produced with Vinylz)
- 07. "Win Some, Lose Some" (co-produced with T-Minus)

=== Jamie Foxx – Hollywood: A Story of a Dozen Roses ===
- 02. "You Changed Me" (featuring Chris Brown) (co-produced with Vinylz, Allen Ritter, Kevin Cossom and Jordan Evans)
- 03. "Like a Drum" (featuring Wale) (co-produced with Syk Sense and Kevin Cossom)
- 04. "Another Dose" (co-produced with Frank Dukes and Kevin Cossom)
- 14. "On the Dot" (featuring Fabolous) (co-produced with Vinylz, Allen Ritter, Kevin Cossom and Kataylst)

=== Joe Budden – All Love Lost ===
- 05. "Immortal" (co-produced with Vinylz)
- 11. "Love For You"

=== Drake and Future – What a Time to Be Alive ===
- 03. "Live from the Gutter" (co-produced with Metro Boomin)

=== G-Eazy – When It's Dark Out ===
- 06. "Of All Things" (featuring Too Short) (co-produced with Nickelodeon, Andersson and G-Eazy)

=== Chris Brown – Royalty ===
- 01. "Back to Sleep" (co-produced with Vinylz and Allen Ritter)

=== Lil Durk - Remember My Name ===
- 3. "Like Me" (co-produced with Vinylz and Allen Ritter)

=== Freddie Gibbs - Shadow of a Doubt ===
- 4. "Fuckin' Up The Count" (co-produced with Speakerbomb and Ging)

== 2016 ==
=== Rihanna – Anti ===
- 04. "Work" (co-produced with Kuk Harrell)
- 16. "Sex With Me" (co-produced with Frank Dukes, Vinylz, Kuk Harrell)

=== Kanye West – The Life of Pablo ===
- 12. "Real Friends" (co-produced with Kanye West, Frank Dukes and Havoc)

=== Lloyd – Tru (EP) ===
- 1. "Tru" (co-produced with J.U.S.T.I.C.E. League)
- 5. "Tru" (Remix)(co-produced with J.U.S.T.I.C.E. League)

=== Drake – Views ===
- 02. "9" (produced by 40, co-produced with Brian Alexander Morgan)
- 05. "Hype" (produced with Nineteen85, co-produced by The Beat Bully)
- 09. "Faithful" (produced by 40, co-produced with Nineteen85)
- 11. "Controlla" (co-produced by Supa Dups and Allen Ritter)

=== Tinashe – Nightride ===
- 12. "Party Favors" (produced with Illangelo, Allen Ritter and Vinylz)

=== PartyNextDoor – PartyNextDoor 3 ===
- 05. "Only U"

=== Travis Scott – Birds in the Trap Sing McKnight ===
- 14. "wonderful" (produced with T-Minus, co-produced by Mike Dean and Travis Scott)

=== J. Cole – 4 Your Eyez Only ===
- 03. "Deja Vu" (produced with Vinylz, Velous, J. Cole, & Ron Gilmore)

=== YG ===
- 00. "Trill" (featuring Lil Wayne; produced with T-Minus)

=== Full Circle ===
- 01. "Full Circle" (with Murda Beatz)

== 2017 ==
=== Belly – Mumble Rap ===
- 01. "Immigration To the Trap"
- 02. "Make a Toast"(produced with Vinylz, T-Minus, Ritter and DannyBoyStyles)
- 05. "Lullaby"(produced with Katalyst and Kruger)
- 08. "Alcantara"(featuring Pusha T; produced with Frank Dukes)
- 09. "Clean Edit"(produced with Al Khaaliq[)

=== Drake – More Life ===
- 01. "Free Smoke" (produced with Allen Ritter and Akira Woodgrain)
- 22. "Do Not Disturb" (produced with Allen Ritter and 40)

=== Eli Sostre ===
- 00. "Glass"(produced with Soriano and Young Martey)

=== Chris Brown – Heartbreak on a Full Moon ===
- 27. "Tough Love"

=== G-Eazy - The Beautiful & Damned ===
- 2. "Pray For Me" (produced with CuBeatz)
- 7. "No Limit" (produced with Allen Ritter)

== 2018 ==
=== Cardi B – Invasion of Privacy ===
- 05. Be Careful (produced with Vinylz and Frank Dukes)
- 06. Best Life (featuring Chance the Rapper; produced with Allen Ritter)

=== Royce da 5'9" – Book of Ryan ===
- 15. Power

=== Drake – Scorpion ===
- 05. God's Plan
- 07. 8 Out of 10 (produced with Sweet and OB)
- 08. Mob Ties (produced with Ritter)
- 18. Ratchet Happy Birthday (produced with Sweet and D10)
- 24. Final Fantasy (produced with 40 and Sweet)

=== The Carters – Everything Is Love ===
- 06. Friends (produced with Beyoncé, JAY-Z and Sweet)
- 07. Heard About Us (produced with Beyoncé, JAY-Z, Vinylz, Illmind and Sweet)

== 2019 ==
=== Juice WRLD – Death Race for Love ===
- 02. "Maze"
- 22. "Make Believe"

=== Lil Nas X – 7 ===
- 07. "C7osure" (produced with Allen Ritter)

=== Schoolboy Q – Crash Talk ===
- 12. "Crash"

=== Drake – Care Package ===
- 03. "How Bout Now" (produced by Boi-1da, Jordan Evans)
- 06. "Draft Day" (produced by Boi-1da, Ducko McFli, Syk Sense )
- 08. "5AM in Toronto" (produced by Boi-1da, Vinylz, Allen Ritter, Seetharam)
- 10. "My Side" (produced by Noah "40" Shebib, Cadastre, Boi-1da)

=== Lil Durk – Love Songs 4 The Streets 2 ===
- 7. "U Said" (produced with Jahaan Sweet, Charlie Handsome)

=== SiR – Chasing Summer ===
- 9. "Touch Down" (produced with Nick Brongers)

=== G-Eazy – Scary Nights ===
- 1. "Scary Nights" (produced with The Rascals, Jahaan Sweet, Nils & Ben Billions)
- 2. "I Wanna Rock" (featuring Gunna) (produced with TT Audi, Jahaan Sweet & Sevn Thomas)

== 2020 ==
=== Kehlani – It Was Good Until It Wasn't ===
- 10. "Serial Lover" (produced with Jahaan Sweet, Smplgtwy, Vianey OJ, and YogiTheProducer)
- 13. "Grieving" (featuring James Blake) (produced with Jahaan Sweet, The Rascals, and YogiTheProducer)

=== Chloe x Halle – Ungodly Hour ===
- 13. "ROYL" (produced with Chloe Bailey and Jahaan Sweet)

=== Justin Bieber – Changes ===
- 11. "Get Me" (featuring Kehlani) (produced by Vinylz, CVRE, Poo Bear, Boi-1da, Jahaan Sweet)

=== A Boogie wit da Hoodie – Artist 2.0 ===
- 11. "R.O.D." (produced by Boi-1da, S. Dot, Band on the Beat, YoungKio)
- 17. "King of My City" (produced by Boi-1da, S. Dot, Band on the Beat)

=== Lecrae ===
- 11. "This is my time."

=== Aminé – Limbo ===
- 7. “Shimmy” (produced with Vinylz, OZ, Nik D, and A. Pasque)

=== Jack Harlow - That's What They All Say ===
- 11. "Tyler Herro" (produced with Jahaan Sweet, Neenyo, and Scott Storch)

== 2022 ==
=== Drake & 21 Savage – Her Loss ===
- 8. “Treacherous Twins” (produced with OZ and Noel Cadastre)
- 9. “Circo Loco” (produced with 40 and Tay Keith)

=== Freddie Gibbs – $oul $old $eparately ===
- 7. "Space Rabbit" (produced with Jahaan Sweet and Rogét Chahayed)

=== Kendrick Lamar – Mr. Morale & The Big Steppers ===
- 2. "N95" (produced with Jahaan Sweet, Sounwave, and Baby Keem)
- 12. "Silent Hill" (produced with Jahaan Sweet, Sounwave, and Beach Noise)

=== Kodak Black - Back For Everything ===
- 16. "He Love the Streets" (produced with Vinylz, Coleman, Sean Momberger, and Lee Major)

=== Jack Harlow - Come Home The Kids Miss You ===
- 3. "I’d Do Anything To Make You Smile" (produced with Angel López, Nemo Achida, 2forwOyNE, Bobby Kritical, Rogét Chahayed, Jack Harlow, and Charlie Handsome)
- 9. "I Got A Shot" (produced with Timbaland, Foreign Teck, Clay Harlow, Tobias Wincorn, Nemo Achida, Frankie Bash, Rogét Chahayed, jetsonmade, Jasper Harris, Jack Harlow, Charlie Handsome, and Angel López)
- 10. Churchill Downs" (produced with TT Audi, Ace G, and Ryan Bakalarczyk)
- 14. "Nail Tech" (produced with Coleman, John Mayer, Jahaan Sweet, Angel López, Rogét Chahayed, Fierce, and NOVA CANYON)

=== Beyoncé – Renaissance ===
- 11. "HEATED" (produced with Beyoncé, Sevn Thomas, Neenyo, Jahaan Sweet, Cadenza, Kelman Duran, Stuart White, Harry Edwards, and Calev)

=== A Boogie wit da Hoodie - Me Vs. Myself ===
- 5. "Money Conversations" (produced with YogiTheProducer and Mosaic Music)

=== Giveon – Give or Take ===
- 2. "Scarred" (produced with Nils, Leon Thomas III, and Don Mills)
- 15. "Unholy Matrimony" (produced with Tim Suby, Don Mills, and Allen Ritter)

== 2023 ==
=== Don Toliver – Love Sick ===
- 11. “Do It Right” (produced with Jahaan Sweet)

=== Travis Scott – UTOPIA ===
- 7. "MELTDOWN" (featuring Drake)
- 14. "Skitzo" (featuring Young Thug) (produced with Jahaan Sweet, Sevn Thomas, Nami, Nik Dean, Coleman, Slim Pharaoh & Travis Sayles)
- 17. "K-POP" (with The Weeknd and Bad Bunny)

=== Drake – For All the Dogs ===
- 6. "First Person Shooter" (featuring J. Cole)
- 16. "All the Parties" (featuring Chief Keef) (produced with Coleman, BNYX, Fierce, Maneesh, Harley Arsenault & Jdolla)
- 28. "Evil Ways" (featuring J. Cole) (produced with Vinylz, FNZ & Fierce)

=== Offset - SET IT OFF ===
- 9. "I'M ON" (produced with Fierce and Peter Iskander)
- 12. "SKYAMI" (produced with 2Epik and SMPLGTWY)
- 18. "JEALOUSY" (produced with OZ and Jahaan Sweet)
- 19. "BLAME IT ON SET" (produced with Fierce, TheLoudPack, and Coleman)

=== Jack Harlow – Jackman ===
- 9. "Blame On Me" (produced with Hollywood Cole, Azul, Gray Hawken, Boi-1da, and Angel López)

=== Kodak Black – When I Was Dead ===
- 5. "Burning Rubber" (produced with SMPLGTWY, Zubnid, Yonatan Watts, and TheBLKLT$)

=== Nicki Minaj - Pink Friday 2 ===
- 8. "Pink Birthday" (produced with Fierce, Apollo Parker, & 116)
- 9. "Needle" (produced with YogiTheProducer)

== 2024 ==
=== Karan Aujla & Divine (rapper) – Street Dreams ===
- 5. "Tareefan" (produced with WondaGurl, Allen Ritter, and Leven Kali)

=== Future & Metro Boomin – We Don't Trust You ===
- 8. "Magic Don Juan (Princess Diana)" (produced with Honorable C Note, Deputy and Southside)

== 2026 ==
=== Jhené Aiko – Westside Whimsy ===
- 13. "Mine" (produced with PartyNextDoor)
