= Surrender (Bizzle album) =

Studio album by Bizzle
- Released: October 23, 2015
- Genre: Christian hip hop
- Length: 58:22
- Label: God Over Money
- Producer: Beanz N Kornbread, Boi-1da, The Cratez, Dilemma, Dreamcatchers, Marv4MoBeats, Vybe

Bizzle chronology
The Good Fight (2013)	Surrender (2015)

Surrender is the third studio album from Bizzle. God Over Money Records released the album on October 23, 2015. He worked with Beanz N Kornbread, Boi-1da, The Cratez, Dilemma, Dreamcatchers, Marv4MoBeats, and Vybe, in the production of this album.

== Critical reception ==
Professional ratings
Review scores
Source	Rating
The Christian Manifesto	3.5/5 stars
Up Nxt Music	5/5 stars

Cal Moore, giving the album three and a half stars from The Christian Manifesto, writes, "Surrender is a still a progression for Bizzle."

Tare-el Varnes of Up Nxt Music gives Bizzle five stars for this album saying "This is the way Gospel Hip-Hop should open and close the fourth quarter!"

== Track listing ==
No.	Title	Producer(s)	Length
1.	"Intro"		0:18
2.	"Surrender" (featuring Monty G)	Marv4MoBeats	3:19
3.	"Not for Sale" (featuring Kefia Rollerson)	Marv4MoBeats & Dilemma	3:38
4.	"Protocol"	Marv4MoBeats	4:08
5.	"No More"	Vybe	3:51
6.	"No Hate" (featuring Bumps Inf)	Beanz-N-Kornbread	3:51
7.	"Anybody"	Marv4MoBeats	3:04
8.	"Ride Out"	Beanz-N-Kornbread	3:40
9.	"Sin No More"	Dreamcatchers	3:17
10.	"Better with You" (featuring J. Carter)	Boi-1da	3:16
11.	"Feel Good" (featuring Crystal Tamar)	The Cratez	4:09
12.	"All Over Again"	Marv4MoBeats	4:12
13.	"Believers"	Beanz-N-Kornbread	3:49
14.	"Prayers Up"	Boi-1da	4:38
15.	"Soul Deep"	Boi-1da	4:32
16.	"Monopoly" (featuring Christon Gray)	Marv4MoBeats	4:40
Total length:			58:22

== Chart performance ==
Chart (2015)	Peak position
US Billboard 200	165
US Christian Albums (Billboard)	8
US Independent Albums (Billboard)	9
US Top Rap Albums (Billboard)	13
