= Book of Ryan =

Studio album by Royce da 5'9"
- Released: May 4, 2018
- Recorded: 2013–2018
- Studio: Various studios: Heaven Studios (Birmingham, Michigan) Plymouth Rock Studios (Plymouth, Michigan) Collective Studios (Oak Park, Michigan) Record Room Studios (Miami, Florida) Effigy Studios (Detroit, Michigan) Palms Studio (Las Vegas, Nevada)
- Genre: Hip hop
- Length: 65:25
- Label: Heaven Studios; eOne
- Producer: Royce da 5'9" (exec.); Mr. Porter (also exec.); Akino Childrey (co-exec.); S1 (also co-exec.); 808-Ray; AntMan Wonder; Boi-1da; Cool & Dre; DJ Khalil; Epikh Pro; Frank Dukes; Fuse; Illmind; Key Wane; The Maven Boys; StreetRunner; Tarik Azzouz

Royce da 5'9" chronology
PRhyme 2 (2018)	Book of Ryan (2018)	The Allegory (2020)

Singles from Book of Ryan
- 1. "Boblo Boat" Released: March 2, 2018; 2. "Stay Woke" Released: April 13, 2018; 3. "Dumb" Released: April 20, 2018; 4. "Caterpillar" Released: May 3, 2018; 5. "Amazing" Released: August 31, 2018; 6. "Power" Released: September 7, 2018; 7. "Cocaine" Released: January 18, 2019

Book of Ryan is the seventh studio album by American rapper Royce da 5'9". It was released on May 4, 2018 by Royce's own label Heaven Studios and eOne Music. The album features guest appearances from artists Eminem, J. Cole, Pusha T, Jadakiss, Fabolous, T-Pain, Logic, pianist Robert Glasper, Chavis Chandler, Agent Sasco, King Green, Ashley Sorrell, Melanie Rutherford, and Marsha Ambrosius. Meanwhile, the production was handled by a wide array of producers, including Mr. Porter, S1, Boi-1da, Cool & Dre, DJ Khalil and Frank Dukes, among others. Upon its release, the album received critical acclaim.

== Background ==
Discussing the album in a Vibe interview weeks prior to the release of his sixth album Layers in April 2016, Royce stated Book of Ryan will be a "very personal one" and more introspective than his previous discography, saying that "it's really, really a lot of the stuff that I want to share". He also stated that the album was approaching completion and was going to be released the same year. Little was said about Book of Ryan until after two years of delays for unknown reasons, the tracklist and cover art were revealed on March 22, 2018, after the collaborative release of PRhyme 2 with producer DJ Premier as a part of the duo PRhyme. On the same day, it was also announced that Royce, along with producers Mr. Porter and S1 (both who did production for Layers), are serving as executive producers for the album.

On April 25, Royce officially revealed the producers for Book of Ryan. The next day on April 26, Royce announced the featured artists on the album.

== Singles ==
The lead single, "Boblo Boat" featuring J. Cole, was released on March 23, 2018. A music video for the single, directed by Cole, was released on Apple Music and Royce's official Vevo channel three days later on March 26. In "Boblo Boat", the two artists focus on reminiscing on their childhood while the video centers on a group of children going to a local carnival and walking around the park while simultaneously getting into trouble, with frequent references to the Boblo Island Amusement Park. Comedian Cedric the Entertainer makes a cameo in the video as a security guard, who also contributed additional vocals at the beginning of the song.

"Stay Woke", the second single featuring female Detroit singer Ashley Sorrell, was released on April 13, 2018. In the song, Royce talks about his documented past struggles with alcohol addiction, while celebrating how long it has been since he became sober. In an interview with HotNewHipHop on April 13, 2018, Royce elaborated on the choice of "Stay Woke" being the second single for Book of Ryan:

“Stay Woke” is more like an excerpt off the album. When you listen to the album in its entirety, “Stay Woke” serves as a commercial. Like a small gap in the story, just for you to hear some bars for a second.

The third single, "Dumb" featuring Shady Records rapper Boogie, was released on April 19, 2018. It describes Royce and Boogie's frustration with the music industry. Joel Zela of 2DOPEBOYZ described the song being a "bar-for-bar" collaboration and also noted the production, calling it "piano-driven". The fourth and last single, "Caterpillar" featuring Eminem and King Green, was released and accompanied by a music video on May 3, 2018.

== Critical reception ==
Professional ratings
Aggregate scores
Source	Rating
Metacritic	84/100
Review scores
Source	Rating
Exclaim!	9/10
HipHopDX	4.5/5 stars
HotNewHipHop	88%
JOE	5/5 stars
XXL	4/5 stars

Upon its release, Book of Ryan was met with widespread acclaim from music critics, receiving a score of 84 from review aggregator Metacritic. Will Lavin of JOE stated that Book of Ryan "proves Royce Da 5’9” is a Top 5 dead or alive rapper, no question. Wearing his heart on his sleeve throughout, the album is an introspective gift that not too many people are capable of giving. Combining transcendent lyricism with incredible instrumental choices, it's an excellent example of how beats and rhymes are supposed to marry one another."

== Commercial performance ==
Book of Ryan debuted at number 24 on the US Billboard 200, with 19,000 album-equivalent units, which included 11,000 pure album sales.

== Track listing ==
Standard edition
No.	Title	Writer(s)	Producer(s)	Length
1.	"Intro"	Ryan Montgomery; Anthony Reid	AntMan Wonder	1:29
2.	"Woke"	Montgomery; Dwane Weir	Key Wane	1:32
3.	"My Parallel (Skit)"	Montgomery; Denaun Porter	Mr. Porter	1:09
4.	"Caterpillar" (featuring Eminem and King Green)	Montgomery; Marshall Mathers; Larry Griffin Jr.; King Green; Stuart Lowery	S1; Epikh Pro	4:43
5.	"God Speed" (featuring Ashley Sorrell)	Montgomery; Porter; Ashley Sorrell; Lowery	Mr. Porter	3:10
6.	"Dumb" (featuring Boogie)	Montgomery; Griffin Jr.; Anthony Dixson; Lowery	S1; Epikh Pro	3:07
7.	"Who Are You (Skit)"	Montgomery; Porter; Robert Glasper	Mr. Porter	2:36
8.	"Cocaine"	Montgomery; Nikki Grier; Khalil Abdul-Rahman; Erik Alcock; Daniel Seeff	DJ Khalil	3:33
9.	"Life Is Fair"	Montgomery; Abdul-Rahman; Eduardo Earle; Sam Barsh	Fuse; DJ Khalil	2:47
10.	"Boblo Boat" (featuring J. Cole)	Montgomery; Jermaine Cole; Rayshon Cobbs Jr.; Marcello Valenzano; Andre Lyon	808-Ray; Cool & Dre	4:42
11.	"Legendary"	Montgomery; Porter	Mr. Porter	3:26
12.	"Summer on Lock" (featuring Pusha T, Jadakiss, Fabolous and Agent Sasco)	Montgomery; Terrence Thornton; Jason Phillips; John Jackson; Jeffrey Williams; Nicholas Warwar; Tarik Azzouz; Clemm Rishad	StreetRunner; Tarik Azzouz	3:44
13.	"Amazing" (featuring Melanie Rutherford)	Montgomery; Melanie Rutherford; Griffin Jr.; Lowery	S1; Epikh Pro	3:44
14.	"Outside" (featuring Marsha Ambrosius and Robert Glasper)	Montgomery; Porter; Marsha Ambrosius; Glasper; Keyon Harrold	Mr. Porter	3:19
15.	"Power"	Montgomery; Matthew Samuels; Brett Kruger; Zale Epstein	Boi-1da; The Maven Boys	6:42
16.	"Protecting Ryan (Skit)"	Montgomery; Porter; Glasper	Mr. Porter	3:19
17.	"Strong Friend"	Montgomery; Porter	Mr. Porter	2:38
18.	"Anything/Everything"	Montgomery; Porter	Mr. Porter	2:10
19.	"Stay Woke" (featuring Ashley Sorrell)	Montgomery; Ramon Ibanga Jr.; Adam Feeney; Sorrell	Illmind; Frank Dukes	3:15
20.	"First of the Month" (featuring T-Pain and Chavis Chandler)	Montgomery; Faheem Najim; Chavis Chandler; Weir; Sorrell	Key Wane	4:21
Total length:				54:59

Bonus track edition
No.	Title	Writer(s)	Producer(s)	Length
21.	"Caterpillar (Remix)" (featuring Logic and King Green)	Montgomery; Sir Robert Hall II; Griffin Jr.; Green; Lowery	S1; Epikh Pro	5:11
Total length:				65:25

=== Notes ===
- "Cocaine" features additional vocals by Nikki Grier.
- "Boblo Boat" features additional vocals by Cedric the Entertainer.

=== Sample credits ===
- "Woke" contains samples of "Woke Up This Morning", written and performed by Alabama 3.
- "Caterpillar" and "Caterpillar (Remix)" contain samples of "The Revolution Will Not Be Televised", written and performed by Gil Scott-Heron; and portions of "Ring the Alarm", written and performed by Tenor Saw.
- "Dumb" contains samples of "Just Playing Dreams", written and performed by The Notorious B.I.G.
- "Boblo Boat" contains samples of "A Day in the Park", written by Michał Urbaniak, and performed by Urszula Dudziak; and excerpts from the documentary "Boblo Memories", written and narrated by Mort Crim.
- "Amazing" contains samples of "Everybody Wants to Rule the World", written and performed by Tears for Fears.
- "Power" contains samples of "Eazy-Duz-It", written by MC Ren and performed by Eazy-E.
- "First of the Month" contains samples of "1st of tha Month", written and performed by Bone Thugs-N-Harmony.

== Personnel ==
Credits adapted from the album's liner notes.

General personnel

- Ryan Montgomery – composition, executive producer, A&R direction
- Denaun Porter – composition, executive producer, producer (tracks 3, 5, 7, 11, 14, 16–18)
- Larry Griffin Jr. – composition, co-executive producer, producer (tracks 4, 6, 13, 21)
- Akino Childrey – co-executive producer, management, marketing
- Brian Jones – recording
- I.V. Duncan – recording
- Morning Estrada – recording
- Mike "Kuz" – recording
- Sal Buscemi – recording
- Ryan Highland – recording
- Alexander "Smitty Beatz" Smith – recording
- Mike Strange – recording (Eminem vocals)
- Juro "Mez" Davis – recording (J. Cole vocals)
- Kevin Luu – recording (Marsha Ambrosius vocals)
- Mauricio Iragorri – mastering
- Steve Baughman – mastering
- Brian "Big Bass" Gardner – mastering ("Caterpillar")

Additional personnel

- Tresa Sanders – publicity
- Chelsea Donini – digital marketing
- Mike Saputo – art direction, design
- Bruce Seckendorf – business management
- Roger Mendoza – business management
- Cindy De Sabato – business management

== Charts ==
Chart (2018)	Peak position
Canadian Albums (Billboard)	27
Dutch Albums (Album Top 100)	136
New Zealand Heatseeker Albums (RMNZ)	7
Scottish Albums (OCC)	52
Swiss Albums (Schweizer Hitparade)	78
UK Albums (OCC)	70
US Billboard 200	24
US Independent Albums (Billboard)	3
US Top R&B/Hip-Hop Albums (Billboard)	14
