= Runaway Jones =

Studio album by Miles Jones
- Released: August 18, 2009 (CAN), April 2011 (US)
- Recorded: 2009
- Genre: hip hop
- Label: Mojo Records & Publishing, URBNET/Fontana/Universal (CAN), MB3/Caroline (US)
- Producer: Boi-1da, Black Milk, Mr. Attic, Austin Dovercourt III, DJ Serious, Miles Jones, Natural Diggers, Slakah the Beatchild, Shekem

Miles Jones chronology
One Chance (2006)	Runaway Jones (2009)

Runaway Jones is the second studio album from hip hop artist Miles Jones. The album was released via Jones's label Mojo Records & Publishing and distributed in Canada by URBNET/Fontana/Universal. The album was released by MB3/Caroline in the US on April 26, 2011.

== Track list ==
No.	Title	Writer(s)	Producer(s)	Length
1.	"Again"	M. Jones	Miles Jones	3:45
2.	"Never Too Late"	M. Jones, C. Cross	Black Milk	2:57
3.	"Coast To Coast" (featuring Kae Sun)	M. Jones, K. Darko Mensah	Natural Diggers	2:57
4.	"Never Wrong"	M. Jones, M. Samuels	Boi-1da	3:02
5.	"Runaway"	M. Jones, D. Yan	Dj Serious	3:25
6.	"Enter Time Machine"	M. Jones	Miles Jones	0:12
7.	"Time Machine"	M. Jones K. Dandy	Austin Dovercourt III	3:35
8.	"Exit Time Machine"	M. Jones	Miles Jones	0:19
9.	"Rhyme Like This" (featuring Percee P)	M. Jones, D. Yan	Dj Serious	2:53
10.	"Trust Me"	M. Jones, R. King, R. Perryman	Mr. Attic	2:59
11.	"Good Morning Mr. Jones"	M. Jones	Miles Jones	0:24
12.	"Say What" (featuring Shad)	M. Jones, S. Kabango, B. Joseph	Slakah the Beatchild	3:47
13.	"No More" (featuring Marinda)	M. Jones	Shekem	4:00
14.	"Good Night Mr. Jones"	M. Jones	Miles Jones	0:40
15.	"Things You Do"	M. Jones	Miles Jones	2:42
16.	"Blow Up One"	M. Jones	Natural Diggers	3:50
