= The Re-Up =

The Re-Up may refer to:

- Eminem Presents: The Re-Up, a compilation album by Eminem
- Pink Friday: Roman Reloaded – The Re-Up, the reissue of Pink Friday: Roman Reloaded by Nicki Minaj
