= Assassin (deejay) =

Jamaican dancehall DJ

Assassin OD
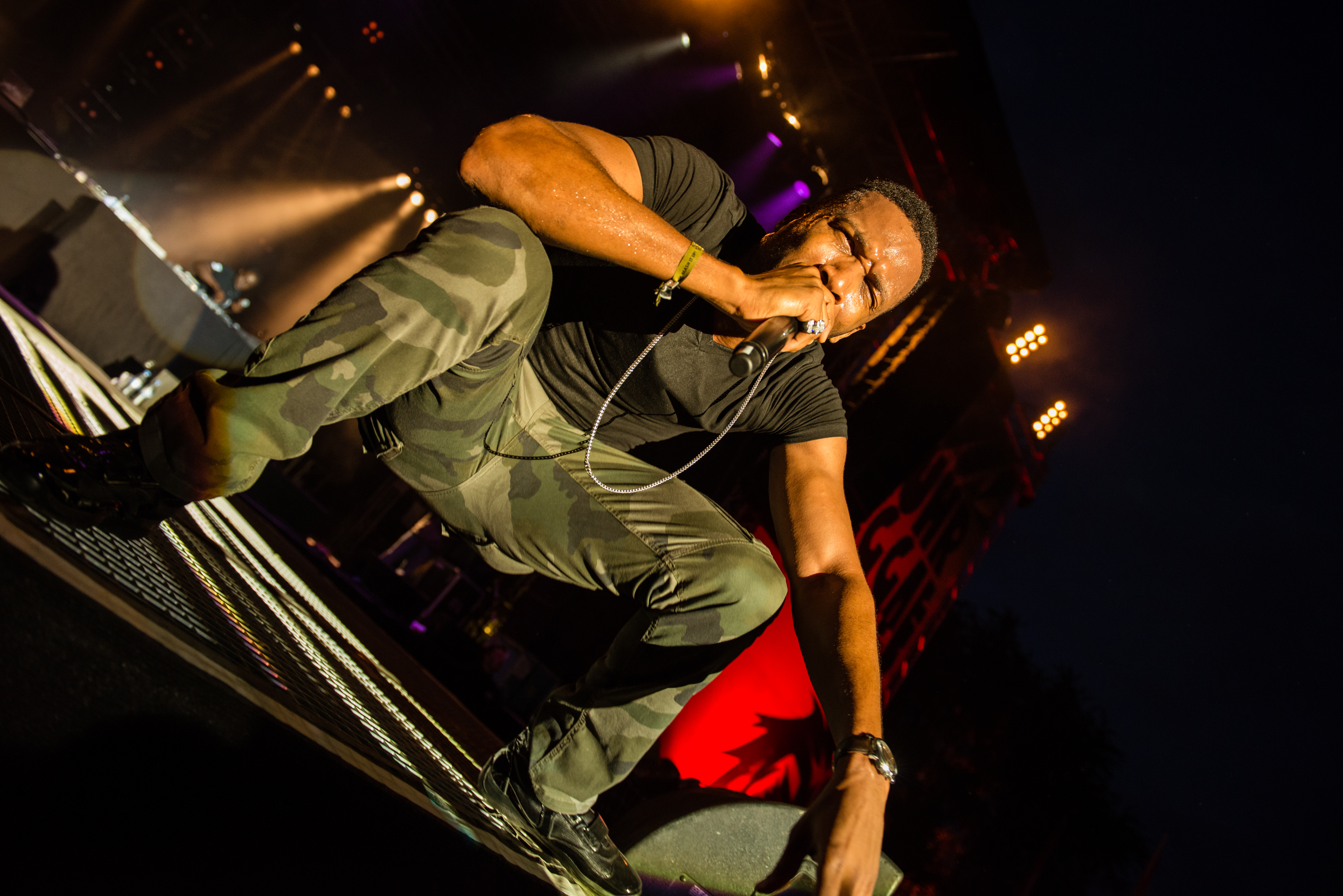
- Agent Sasco in 2014

Background information
- Also known as: Agent Sasco; Agent 006; Agent 00
- Born: Jeffrey E. Campbell; 22 December 1982 (age 43); Kingston, Jamaica
- Origin: Jamaica
- Genres: Dancehall; reggae
- Years active: 1999–present
- Labels: VP; Boardhouse Records
- Website: www.agentsasco.com

Jeffrey E. Campbell (born 22 December 1982), known professionally as Assassin and Agent Sasco, is a Jamaican dancehall deejay.

== Biography ==
Campbell grew up in Kintyre, St. Andrew before relocating to Kingston. His career began in 1999 when his lyrics were recorded by Spragga Benz as "Shotta"; He soon started recording himself, releasing his first single in 2000. He gained the nickname 'Assassin' while at Camperdown High School.

He signed to VP Records, and released two albums for the label before switching to Boardhouse Records, which he co-owns and started in 2008. His second album, Gully Sit'n, was described as a "celebration of ghetto life".

In the mid-2000s, he started an internet based degree in Business Management from the University of Sunderland. He began using the stage name 'Agent Sasco' as it has more "Googleability" than 'Assassin'. His single "Talk How Mi Feel" reached number one on the Jamaica Countdown Chart in June 2011.

In 2013, he was featured on the song “I’m In It” by American recording artist Kanye West on his 6th solo album, Yeezus.

In February 2015, Campbell was featured on the song "The Blacker the Berry" by Grammy award winner Kendrick Lamar. It was certified gold after selling over 500,000 copies.

On 19 February 2016, he released the album Theory of Reggaetivity.

== Discography ==
=== Albums ===
- Infiltration (2005), VP
- Gully Sit'n (2007), VP
- Theory of Reggaetivity (2016), Germaica Digital (Europe)
- Hope River (2018), Diamond Studios

=== Singles ===
- "Wah Gwaan" (2000), First Name Music
- "Two Words For You" (2000), Mixing Lab
- "Money Maker" (2000), True Blue Family
- "Dam It" (2000), Penthouse
- "Yu Nuh Coot" (2000), First Name Music
- "Won't" (2001), Full Hundred – split single with Sean Paul
- "Dedicated to the World" (2001), Natural Bridge
- "Let Me Through" (2001), Massive B
- "Stages" (2002), Gargamel Music
- "Surprise" (2002), Awful Music
- "The Answer" (2002), 40/40 Productions
- "Diet" (2002), Black Shadow
- "Do Ma Thing" (2003), Kings of KIngs
- "Its A Girl Thing" (2003), Blaxxx
- "Strait" (2003), Don Corleon Music
- "Pull Up" (2003), Don Corleon Music
- "We a Bad From" (2003), Builders
- "Girls Alone" (2003), 40/40 Productions
- "Nobody Else" (2003), Penthouse – with Nicky Burt
- "Roll In" (2003), 40/40 Productions
- "Have Dat" (2003), South Rakkas Crew
- "Youth Well Cold" (2003), Penthouse – Assassin & Freddie McGregor
- "Don't Like You" (2004), Jah Snowcone
- "Man Town" (2004), John John
- "Step Pon Dem" (2004), Birchill
- "They Don't Know" (2004), Red Dragon Music
- "Move And Go-Weh" (2004), Big Jeans
- "Girls Gone Wild" (2004), H2O Productions
- "Don't Like You" (2004), Jah Snowcone
- "As A Man" (2005), Steely & Clevie
- "Some Gal" (2005), Birchill
- "Break You Down" (2005), First Name Music
- "Gangsta City" (2005), 40/40 Productions
- "Tell Wey U Come From" (2006), Gargamel Music
- "No Price" (2006), Champagne International
- "Talk Bout Yu Youth" (2006), Don Corleon – Voice Mail & Assassin
- "Mouth Mek Fi Chat" (2006), Don Corleon
- "Low The Music" (2006), Supertronics Muzic
- "Real Gallis" (2006), 2Cus Production
- "I Don't Care" (2006), Zero G Records
- "Boring Gal" (2007), Birchill Records
- "Do Mek Me Hold You" (2007), Don Corleon
- "Carry News" (2007), Big Ship
- "Can't Beg Fi Dem" (2007), Pure Music Productions
- "Beep Out" (2007), H2O Productions
- "Spare Dem" (2008), Don Corleon
- "Surveillance" (2008), Daseca
- "Money" (2008), Big Ship
- "Wha Do Dem Guy Deh" (2008), Boardhouse
- "The A. R." (2008), Stainless
- "Pure Gal" (Remix) (2008), Music World Entertainment
- "Priority" (2009), Juke Boxx Productions
- "Hand Inna Di Air" (2009), Big Ship
- "More Peace on Earth" (2009), John John – Michael Rose & Assassin
- "Gal Dem Time Now" (2009), Techniques
- "Wanna Be Ballaz" (2009), Dem Yute Deh Music
- "Dancehall Again" (2010), Daseca
- "History Book" (2010), Juke Boxx Productions
- "Bam Bam" (2010), Juke Boxx Productions
- "Boopsie" (2010), Juke Boxx Productions
- "Mad Sound" (2011), Maximum Sound
- "Ghetto State of Mind" (2011), Maximum Sound – Assassin, Bounty Killer & Half Pint
- "Squeeze Off" (20??), City Dawgs
- "Sissy" (2008), Don Corleon
- "Yard Man" (20??), Pot of Gold
- "Serious Time" (2006), Birchill
- "Free Style" (20??), Danger Zone
- "Guinep Stain" (20??), Liv Up
- "Stop the Fighting" (20??), Penthouse – Richie Stephens & Assassin
- "Anywhere We Go" (2005), Mad House
- "Dancehall Defender" (20??), Opera House
- "To How Yu Livin" (20??), Shy Shy – Spragga Benz & Assassin
- "Good Over Evil" (2006), Mad House
- "Our Style" (20??), Natural Cut
- "Stand By Your Man" (2012), Penthouse – Assassin & Marcia Griffiths
- "Visa Line" (2002), Footsteps
- "As a Man" (2005), VP
- "Do It If Yuh Bad" (2004), Kings of Kings
- "Dem Ting Deh" (2004), Renaissance – Bounty Killer & Assassin
- "Idiot Ting Dat" (2004), Renaissance
- "Soundboy Kill It" (2013) Fly International Luxurious Art, Raekwon, Melanie Fiona
- "I'm In It" (2013), Yeezus – Kanye West, Assassin & Justin Vernon
- "The Blacker the Berry" (2015), Kendrick Lamar
- "I Know There's Gonna Be (Good Times)" (Dre Skull Remix) (2015) In Colour, Jamie xx, Konshens, Kranium, Popcaan
- "Saturnz Barz (Cadenza Remix)" (2017) — Gorillaz, Popcaan, Mad Cobra, Teddy Bruckshot, Killa P
- "Summer on Lock" (2018) Book of Ryan — Royce da 5'9", Pusha T, Fabolous, Jadakiss
- "So Blessed" (2018), Diamond Studios
- "Banks of the Hope" (2018), Diamond Studios
- "Change" (2018), Diamond Studios — Stonebwoy, Kabaka Pyramid, Spragga Benz
- "Bandana" (2019), Freddie Gibbs & Madlib
