= Tough Love & Parables =

Studio album by Bizzle
- Genre: Hip hop; Christian hip hop
- Label: God Over Money
- Producer: Beanz & Kornbread

Tough Love & Parables is Bizzle's first Christian hip hop album released on his own label, God Over Money. It debuted at No. 15 on the Billboard Gospel Albums chart.

== Track listing ==
No.	Title	Producer(s)	Length
1.	"Tough Love Intro"		1:26
2.	"Long Time Comin"	Beanz N' Kornbread	3:43
3.	"15 Seconds"	Viktory	4:43
4.	"Stand Up"	Arsenix the High Standard	3:09
5.	"Better Way" (featuring P Dub)	Beanz N' Kornbread	4:42
6.	"God Over Money"	Dilemma	4:12
7.	"Somebody"	Arsenix the High Standard	4:19
8.	"Don't Throw It"	OQ	3:32
9.	"I'm Tryina Go" (featuring Mouthpi3ce)	Beanz N' Kornbread	4:38
10.	"Christ Reigns" (featuring Bumps Inf, Redd Lettaz, & P Dub)	Vybe Beatz	4:38
11.	"I'll Holla" (featuring Bumps Inf)	Symphony	4:02
12.	"Just Sayin"	Vybe Beatz	4:22
13.	"Liar"	AD	4:45
14.	"Forever"	Arsenix the High Standard	4:40
15.	"You Don't Know"	Quason Arnold	4:41
16.	"Regular People"	Vybe Beatz	4:10
17.	"This Ain't Love" (featuring Lavoisier & Sevin)	Galen Enlow	4:47
18.	"Gotta Seek Change" (featuring Sevin)	Beanz N' Kornbread	4:20
19.	"Forgive Me" (featuring Jin)	Boi-1da	4:12
