= High School (song) =

Single by Nicki Minaj featuring Lil Wayne

from the album Pink Friday: Roman Reloaded – The Re-Up
- Released: April 16, 2013
- Recorded: 2012
- Studio: Studio Malibu (Malibu, CA); The Hit Factory Criteria (Miami, FL)
- Genre: Hip hop; R&B
- Length: 3:38
- Label: Young Money; Cash Money; Republic
- Songwriters: Onika Maraj; Dwayne Carter; Matthew Samuels; Tyler Williams
- Producers: Boi-1da; T-Minus

Nicki Minaj singles chronology
"Tapout" (2013)	"High School" (2013)	"Somebody Else" (2013)

Lil Wayne singles chronology
"Ready to Go" (2013)	"High School" (2013)	"No New Friends" (2013)

Music video
- "High School" on YouTube

"High School" is a song by rapper Nicki Minaj, featuring rapper Lil Wayne, from the reissue of Minaj's second studio album, Pink Friday: Roman Reloaded – The Re-Up (2012). It was released on April 16, 2013 by Young Money, Cash Money and Republic as the album's third and final single.

The hip hop and R&B song was written by Minaj and producers Boi-1da and T-Minus, with additional writing by Lil Wayne. It peaked at number 64 on the U.S. Billboard Hot 100 and number 31 on the UK Singles Chart. It is certified 2× Platinum by the RIAA in the U.S. and Silver in the UK for moving 200,000 units.

Directed by Benny Boom, the music video features Minaj and Lil Wayne, and includes footage of the "Pink Pill", a variation of the "Beats Pro" speaker created by Beats Electronics in collaboration with Minaj.

== Critical reception ==
Jeffries from AllMusic said that the song "restores faith with three-and-half minutes of driven, witty filth." He also noticed that "The Re-Up comes on with such an anti-Roman, back-to-basics attitude that it slowly slithers up to the Wayne track. Women in Hip Hop website gave a very positive review to the track saying that "aggressive voice and flow is a winning factor on this song, Lil Wayne did well and the catchy chorus helped round it out." Bené Viera from VH1 Tuner appreciate Minaj's "storytelling capabilities." Jesal Padania from RapReviews commented negatively saying that "it's another song that doesn't really cut it," and it's "not compared to 'Roman Reloaded'."

== Music video ==
In an interview in Dubai, Nicki confirmed that she will be filming a music video for "High School" or "I'm Legit" in 2013. On February 22, 2013, a fan asked Nicki on UStream when will the video be shot. She responded that she will shoot it in a few weeks, confirming the shoot on March 6. The video was shot on March 11 by Benny Boom in Los Angeles. The music video is confirmed to be released on April 2, 2013, globally, where Minaj will interview with MTV after its premiere and answer questions via Twitter with the hashtag #AskNicki. The video was released at 10.53AM on MTV and an Explicit Version of the video was released at 6:30PM the same day on VEVO. Minaj posted some pictures of the video shoot on March 12, 2013. On March 19, Minaj posted a behind the scenes video filmed and produced by Grizz Lee.

== Credits and personnel ==
Recording:

- Recorded at: Studio Malibu, Malibu CA & The Hit Factory Criteria, Miami FL
- Mixed at: Studio Malibu, Malibu CA
- Mastered at: Chris Athens Masters, Austin TX

Personnel:

- Writers: Onika Maraj, Dwayne Carter, Matthew Samuels, Tyler Williams, Carly Jordan
- Producers: Boi-1da & T-Minus
- Recorded by: Ariel Chobaz & Michael "Banger" Cadahia
- Mixed by: Ariel Chobaz & Boi-1da
- Mastered by: Chris Athens

The credits for "High School" are adapted from the liner notes of Pink Friday: Roman Reloaded - The Re-Up.

== Charts ==
=== Weekly charts ===
Chart (2013)	Peak position
Australia (ARIA)	57
Belgium (Ultratop 50 Flanders)	11
Belgium (Ultratop Flanders Urban)	12
Belgium (Ultratip Bubbling Under Wallonia)	9
Canada Hot 100 (Billboard)	81
Ireland (IRMA)	47
France (SNEP)	91
Netherlands (Single Top 100)	83
Scottish Singles Sales (Official Charts)	34
UK Singles (Official Charts)	31
UK Hip Hop/R&B (Official Charts)	6
US Billboard Hot 100	64
US Hot R&B/Hip-Hop Songs (Billboard)	20
US Rhythmic Airplay (Billboard)	22

=== Year-end ===
Chart (2013)	Rank
Belgium Urban (Ultratop Flanders)	65
US Hot R&B/Hip-Hop Songs (Billboard)	62

== Certifications ==
Region	Certification	Certified units/sales
Australia (ARIA)	Platinum	70,000^{‡}
New Zealand (RMNZ)	Platinum	30,000^{‡}
United Kingdom (BPI)	Gold	400,000^{‡}
United States (RIAA)	2× Platinum	2,000,000^{‡}
^{‡} Sales+streaming figures based on certification alone.

== Radio history ==
Country	Date	Format	Ref
United States	April 16, 2013	Rhythmic contemporary radio	
