= The Maven Boys =

Canadian record producer duo

- Origin: Toronto, Ontario, Canada
- Genres: Hip hop; R&B; pop
- Occupations: Producers; songwriters; musicians
- Instruments: Keyboard; guitar; drum machine; synthesizer; sampler
- Years active: 2010–2015; 2021–present
- Members: Zale "Zalezy" Epstein; Brett Ryan Kruger

The Maven Boys are a songwriting-production duo from Toronto, Ontario, Canada, consisting of Zale "Zalezy" Epstein and Brett Ryan Kruger. In 2012, they were featured on Complex Magazine's 25 New Producers To Watch Out For list. The Maven Boys have co-produced alongside Eminem and Boi-1da. They have worked with many notable artists including Kanye West, Nicki Minaj, 2 Chainz, and Childish Gambino.

== Production Discography ==
=== Singles ===
List of singles as either producer or co-producer, with selected chart positions and certifications, showing year released, performing artists and album name
Title	Year	Peak chart positions			Album
Title	Year	CA	US	US R&B/HH	Album
"Yay Yay" (Schoolboy Q) produced with Boi-1da	2013	–	49	—	Oxymoron
"We Them Niggas" (Ace Hood) produced with Boi-1da	2013	–	—	—	Trials & Tribulations
"God Is Great" (Rockie Fresh) produced with Boi-1da	2013	–	–	–	Self Made Vol. 3
"Chills" (Down With Webster) produced with Boi-1da	2013	19	–	–	Party For Your Life

=== Production credits ===
==== 2010 ====
- "Black Cloud" Joe Budden produced by Zalezy (of The Maven Boys) and MegaMan from the album Mood Muzik 4
- "Say Hello" Tory Lanez from the Mr. Peterson Mixtape produced with Boi-1da

==== 2011 ====
- "Casualty" from Nicole Scherzinger album Killer Love
- "Royalty" Down With Webster From the album Time to Win, Vol. 2
- "Jessica" Down With Webster From the album Time to Win, Vol. 2
- "Work" Down With Webster featuring Far East Movement From the album Time to Win, Vol. 2

==== 2012 ====
- "I Be Puttin' On" (MMG featuring Wale, French Montana, Wiz Khalifa and Roscoe Dash) produced with Boi-1da from the album Self Made Vol. 2
- "Our Way" (Slaughterhouse) produced with Boi-1da and Eminem from the album Welcome to: Our House
- "Jesus Piece" (Game featuring Kanye West and Common) produced with Stephen Kozmeniuk from the album Jesus Piece
- "Up in Flames" from the Nicki Minaj album Pink Friday: Roman Reloaded – The Re-Up
- "Black Faces" Childish Gambino featuring Nipsey Hussle from the mixtape Royalty (mixtape)
- "Goin Down" DJ Drama featuring Fabolous T-Pain and Yo Gotti from the album Quality Street Music
- "The New Generation" Kid Ink produced with Boi-1da
- "Dirty Dark" 2 Chainz produced with Boi-1da
- "Left You Behind" by Ben Stevenson produced with MegaMan

==== 2013 ====
- "Life Long" (Rockie Fresh featuring Rick Ross and Nipsey Hussle) produced with Boi-1da from the mixtape Electric Highway
- "Neon Lights" (Kevin Gates) from the mixtape The Luca Brasi Story
- "Counting on Ya" (Kevin Gates) from the mixtape The Luca Brasi Story
- "Marshall Mathers" (Kevin Gates) from the mixtape The Luca Brasi Story
- "We Them Niggas" (Ace Hood) produced with Boi-1da from the album Trials & Tribulations
- "God is Great" (MMG featuring Rockie Fresh) produced with Boi-1da from the album Self Made Vol. 3
- "If It Isn't You" (Bizzy Crook) from the Mixtape 84
- "Lil N**** Snupe" (Meek Mill produced with Boi-1da from the mixtape Dream Chasers 3
- "Good Luck ANTHM" (Bizzy Crook) from the mixtape 84
- "Time is Money" (Vic Mensa featuring Rockie Fresh) produced with Boi-1da from the mixtape Innanetape
- "Ride Wit Me" (Trae tha Truth featuring Meek Mill and T.I.) produced with Boi-1da from the mixtape I Am King
- "Don't Go Over There" French Montana featuring Fat Joe from the mixtape Mac & Cheese 3
- "Bullets" Skeme produced with Boi-1da from the album Ingleworld
- "Lost My Way" Lecrae from the mixtape Church Clothes 2
- "I'm a Christian" Bizzle from the album The Good Fight
- "Pussy on My Mind" Bow Wow (rapper) Featuring Kid Ink from the mixtape Greenlight 5

==== 2014 ====
- "Lay It Down" (Yo Gotti featuring Chris Echols) produced with Megaman
- "Chills" (Down With Webster) produced with Boi-1da for the album Party For Your Life
- "Feel So Alive" (Down With Webster) for the album Party For Your Life
- "Going Nowhere" (Down With Webster) for the album Party For Your Life
- "Yay Yay" (Schoolboy Q) produced with Boi-1da for the album Oxymoron
- " Legendary" (Mobb Deep featuring Bun B & Juicy J) produced with Boi-1da and Havoc for the album The Infamous Mobb Deep
- "Somebody To Miss You" (T. Mills) for the EP All I Wanna Do
- "Realest in the City" (P. Reign featuring Meek Mill & PartyNextDoor) produced with Boi-1da for the album Dear America
- "Bands in a Depression" (Bizzy Crook featuring OB O'Brien)
- "Psychopath Killer" (Eminem, Slaughterhouse and Yelawolf) produced with Boi-1da and Just Blaze for the album Shady XV
- "N*gga" (Bizzy Crook) from the mixtape Coming to America

==== 2015 ====
- "The Blacker The Berry"(Kendrick Lamar) produced with Boi-1da for the album To Pimp A Butterfly

==== 2016 ====
- "The Line" DVSN from the album Sept. 5th.

==== 2017 ====
- "Lullaby" Belly (Rapper) from the album Mumble Rap

==== 2017 ====
- "Lullaby" Belly (Rapper) from the album Mumble Rap

==== 2026 ====
- "Electric Circus" (Nelly Furtado featuring Boi-1da and Canada Soccer) produced by ZALE (of The Maven Boys), Herag Sanbalian, FnZ and Fierce from the album What If It All Goes Right

== Awards ==
Year	Recipient	Award	Result
2012	Down With Webster - Time To Win, Vol. 2	Juno Award "Pop Album Of The Year"	Nominated
2014	"Chills"	Canadian Radio Music Awards - Heatseeker	Won
2015	Schoolboy Q Oxymoron (album)	Grammy Award for Rap Album of the Year	Nominated
2015	Tre Mission "Stigmata"	Juno Award for Rap Album of the Year	Nominated
2015	P Reign "Dear America"	Juno Award for Rap Album of the Year	Nominated
2015	Down With Webster "Party For Your Life"	Juno Award for Pop Album of the Year	Nominated
