= Chills (Down with Webster song) =

Single by Down with Webster

from the album Party for Your Life
- Released: December 17, 2013
- Recorded: 2013
- Genre: New wave; rap rock
- Length: 3:28
- Label: DWW Entertainment
- Songwriters: Matthew Samuels; Emerson Brooks; Zale Epstein · Brett Ryan Krueger; Down With Webster; Alyssa Veniece Chin
- Producers: Boi-1da; The Maven Boys

Down with Webster singles chronology
"Party for Your Life" (2013)	"Chills" (2013)	"Love Is Not Enough" (2020)

Music video
- "Chills" on YouTube

"Chills" is a song recorded by Canadian rap rock group Down with Webster, taken from their second major-label studio album, Party for Your Life. The song was written by the members of Down With Webster and Emerson Brooks along with the song's producers, Matthew Samuels and Zale Epstein and Brett Ryan Krueger, under their production monikers Boi-1da and The Maven Boys, respectively. It was released through the group's own DWW Entertainment on December 17, 2013, as the third single from Party for Your Life. The single went Platinum on July 21, 2014, and has sold 78,000 digital copies.

== Release ==
Upon the release of their third studio album, Party for Your Life, the group released "Chills" on December 17, 2013, as the third single from the album. They released a teaser to the track prior on November 25. Remixes to the song were done by Canadian DJ Shaun Frank and Swedish DJ Manse and was released on June 16, 2014.

== Music video ==
The official lyric video for the song premiered on MetroLyrics on December 20, 2013, before being uploaded to VEVO and YouTube on December 23, 2013. In the video, the lyrics of the song are traced in the fogged up windows of a Kia Sorento by an unseen person in the dark of night. Amanda Hutchison of Metro Lyrics praised the video's "unique concept" and how well it fit with the song's lyrics.

On March 7, 2014, the group released the official music video. The video, shot in greyscale, shows each of the group members alone in an empty room with their hands covering their face, and an image of their face projected onto the backs of their hands. MuchMusic blogger Liam Scott described the visual effects in the video as "pretty nifty (if slightly creepy)," which helped deliver the titular chills.

== Awards and nominations ==
Awards and nominations for "Chills"
Year	Organization	Award	Result	Ref(s)
2014	MuchMusic Video Awards	Best Pop Video	Nominated	
2015	SOCAN Awards	Pop/Rock Music of the Year	Won	

== Chart performance ==
"Chills" entered the Billboard Canadian Hot 100 at No. 41 for the week ending January 4, 2014. It peaked at No. 19, which it held for two weeks straight.

== Track listing ==
Digital download
No.	Title	Length
1.	"Chills"	3:28

Digital download – Remixes
No.	Title	Length
1.	"Chills" (Manse Remix)	4:22
2.	"Chills" (Shaun Frank Remix)	6:15

== Charts ==
=== Weekly charts ===
Weekly chart performance for "Chills"
Chart (2013–14)	Peak position
Canada (Canadian Hot 100)	19
Canada AC (Billboard)	21
Canada CHR/Top 40 (Billboard)	13
Canada Hot AC (Billboard)	16

=== Year-end charts ===
Year-end chart performance for "Chills"
Chart (2014)	Position
Canada (Canadian Hot 100)	51

== Certifications ==
Region	Certification	Certified units/sales
Canada (Music Canada)	Platinum	80,000^{*}
^{*} Sales figures based on certification alone.

== Release history ==
Release history and formats for "Chills"
Region	Date	Format	Versions	Label	Ref.
Various	December 17, 2013	Digital download	Original	DWW Entertainment	
Netherlands	June 16, 2014	Digital download	Remixes	Trice Recordings	
