= The Good Fight (Bizzle album) =

Studio album by Bizzle
- Released: May 7, 2013
- Genre: Hip hop; Christian hip hop
- Label: God Over Money
- Producer: Beat Sampras; Boi-1da; Cam Wallace; Dilemma; Marv4MoBeats; The Maven Boys; Megaman; Q. Smith; Sevin; T-Minus; Vinyalz

The Good Fight is Bizzle's second Christian hip hop album released on May 7, 2013 under Bizzle's own record label God Over Money. It was produced by Boi-1da, Dilemma, Megaman and others. It contains collaborations with No Malice, Willie 'P-Dub' Moore Jr. and Sevin.

It debuted at No. 2 on Billboard's Gospel Albums chart, No. 7 on Christian Albums and No. 11 on Top Rap Albums selling a total of 3,962 copies in its first week.

== Critical reception ==
Professional ratings
Review scores
Source	Rating
New Release Tuesday	4.5/5 stars

New Release Tuesday's Mark Ryan stated that it was "hip-hop evangelism at its finest" and Bizzle "touches on use of the 'N-word' and pimp as ways to greet one another". Ryan found it atypical of Christian hip hop artists to "be so blatant in their phrasing ... but is truly refreshing to hear someone come straight out and ask the questions."

Aubrey McKay of Wade-O Radio, however, described Bizzle's use of the N-word as inappropriate. Even so, McKay highlighted "The Way", "Mr Range Rover" and "Better Way Pt. 2" as standout tracks and that The Good Fight as "a great record on several levels".

Simon Ramaker from Dutch website Christelijkerap highlighted the album's second single, "Dear Hip-Hop", as a song that clearly criticizes hip hop culture. Along with this, Ramaker noted "My Confession" was a "very special track" addressing Bizzle's porn addiction and sexual history.

== Track listing ==
No.	Title	Producer(s)	Length
1.	"Lead Me"	Boi-1da	3:13
2.	"Here We Go"	Dilemma	4:30
3.	"Do It Again" (featuring Willie Moore Jr.)	Boi-1da	4:01
4.	"Think 4 a Minute"	Boi-1da	3:51
5.	"Dear Hip Hop"	Boi-1da	5:17
6.	"You Know"	Boi-1da	5:09
7.	"Higher" (featuring J. Carter)	Q. Smith	3:53
8.	"Against You"	Boi-1da	3:51
9.	"The Way" (featuring Haley Hunt)	Boi-1da	4:16
10.	"Make Her the Mrs." (featuring Willie Moore Jr.)	Boi-1da	3:59
11.	"I'm a Christian"	Boi-1da; The Maven Boys	3:51
12.	"Soldier" (featuring No Malice)	Dilemma	3:35
13.	"Options"	Marv4MoBeats	5:05
14.	"Mr. Range Rover" (featuring Kay Richards)	Megaman	3:43
15.	"Tomorrow (No Win)"	Boi-1da; T-Minus	3:31
16.	"My Confession" (featuring Sevin)	Boi-1da; Beat Sampras	4:33
17.	"Safest Place (Interlude)" (featuring Sevin)	Sevin	1:51
18.	"Meet My Savior"	Cam Wallace	3:56
19.	"Not Alone" (featuring Nina Sims)	Boi-1da	5:00

Bonus tracks

No.	Title	Producer(s)	Length
20.	"Better Way Pt.2 (Sandy Hook Tribute)"	Boi-1da; Vinyalz	5:29
21.	"Wonder"	Boi-1da	4:02

== Charts ==
Chart	Peak position
Billboard 200	116
Billboard Gospel Albums	2
Rap Albums	11
Christian Albums	7
