= Room for Improvement (mixtape) =

Mixtape by Drake
- Released: February 14, 2006
- Recorded: 2005–2006
- Studios: Elsadig Residence; Positive Vibes; BCP
- Genre: Hip-hop
- Length: 65:36
- Label: All Things Fresh
- Producers: Boi-1da; DJ Ra; Frank Dukes; DFS; Amir; Soundtrakk

Drake chronology
Room for Improvement (2006)	Comeback Season (2007)

Singles from Room for Improvement
- 1. "Do What You Do" Released: December 7, 2005; 2. "City Is Mine" Released: June 9, 2006

Room for Improvement is the debut mixtape by Canadian rapper Drake. It was self-released on February 14, 2006, by All Things Fresh. Issued as a retail project, it sold 6,000 copies by the end of that year. It features contributions from Toronto natives Slakah the Beatchild, Frank Dukes, and Boi-1da; as well as American singer Trey Songz and American rapper Nickelus F.

== Background ==
In February 2006, in an interview with thabiz.com, Drake talked about the mixtape, "It's a mix CD and I did it with DJ Smallz, who does the Southern Smoke Series. He's done mixtapes with everyone. Lil Wayne, Young Jeezy, a lot of people and he's hosting it for me. It's called Room for Improvement. It's seventeen original tracks and a couple of remixes and stuff like that. 22 tracks in total. I have the Clipse on there, I got Trey Songz in there, I got Lupe Fiasco on there, I have Nickelus F, who is this amazing artist from Virginia, who I'm very very tight with and we work together a lot, we worked together. I have Voyce on there, he's a singer from Toronto. Production wise I don't really have any major producers on there. I have a song I did with Trey Songz. I have an individual by the name of Nick Rashur from Harlem he's a really cool cat. Amir; Boi-1da did the majority of the singles, who else should I mention DJ Ra from DC, a lot of people on the CD.

The mixtape was re-released in 2009, featuring only 11 selected songs, with no DJs along with a remix of 'Do What You Do'.

== Track listing ==
Partial credits adapted from Drake's personal notebook.

No.	Title	Writer(s)	Producer(s)	Length
2.	Untitled			1:11
3.	"Special" (featuring Voyce)	Aubrey Graham	DJ Ra	4:52
4.	"Do What You Do"		Boi-1da	3:48
5.	"Money (Remix)" (featuring Nickelus F)	Graham	Frank Dukes	2:25
6.	"AM 2 PM" (featuring Nickelus F)			3:28
7.	"City Is Mine"		Boi-1da	3:53
8.	"Drake's Voice Mail Box #1"			1:12
9.	"Bad Meaning Good" (featuring Slakah the Beatchild)	Graham; Byram Joseph	Slakah the Beatchild	2:32
10.	"Thrill Is Gone"	Graham	Slakah the Beatchild	3:02
11.	"Make Things Right" (featuring Slakah the Beatchild)	Graham	Boi-1da; Amir	2:41
12.	"Video Girl"	Graham	DFS	3:46
13.	"Drake's Voice Mail Box #2"			0:16
14.	"Come Winter"		Rynn; Amir	5:28
15.	"Extra Special"		Tommy Gunz	2:58
16.	"About the Game (Freestyle)" (featuring Trey Songz)			1:45
17.	"All This Love" (featuring Voyce)		Exchange Student	3:20
18.	"Drake's Voice Mail Box #3"			1:12
19.	"A Scorpio's Mind" (featuring Nickelus F)		Amir	3:52
20.	"S.T.R.E.S.S." (featuring Nickelus F)		Rynn	3:43
21.	"Try Harder"		Amir	2:22
22.	"Kick, Push (Remix)" (performed by Lupe Fiasco featuring Drake)		Soundtrakk	4:44
23.	"U.P.A. (Outro)"			2:14
Total length:				65:36

Notes

- "Pianist Hands" features uncredited vocals from Mazin's dad
- "Make Things Right" features uncredited vocals from Slakah the Beatchild

== Personnel ==
Partial credits adapted from Drake's personal notebook.

Musicians

- Al-Khaaliq – piano (track 2)
