= Theory of Reggaetivity =

Studio album by Assassin a.k.a. Agent Sasco
- Released: February 19, 2016
- Genre: Reggae
- Length: 33:33
- Label: Germaica Digital, Sound Age Ent

Professional ratings
Review scores
Source	Rating
iTunes	5/5 stars

Theory of Reggaetivity is the third studio album from the Dancehall Artist Assassin a.k.a. Agent Sasco. The album features guest appearances from Chronixx and Elesia, Limura. The artist toured Europe and the United States in support of the album prior to its release.

The album follows Assassin's collaborations in the hip-hop scene with Kanye West and Grammy Award Winner Kendrick Lamar.

The album features reggae music filled with classic one-drop grooves and melodies.

By its second week of release, Theory of Reggaetivity had reached number 3 on the Billboard Chart and number 2 on the iTunes Reggae Chart.

== Track listing ==
1. "Theory of Reggaetivity" – 2:20
2. "What is Reggae (feat. AC, LC & JC)" – 0:09
3. "Reggae Origin" – 4:01
4. "Health and Wealth (Kingston Mix)" – 3:44
5. "Lc Intro(feat. LC)" – 0:09
6. "Feel Highrie" – 3:57
7. "Mix Up" – 2:39
8. "Crazy (feat. Elesia Limura)" – 2:35
9. "Africa" – 3:34
10. "J-O-B (Skit)" – 0:49
11. "No Slave (feat. Chronixx)" – 5:16
12. "Stronger" – 3:47
13. "Day in Day Out" – 3:08
14. "Country Bus" – 3:26
