= Freedom (Nicki Minaj song) =

Single by Nicki Minaj

from the album Pink Friday: Roman Reloaded – The Re-Up
- Released: November 2, 2012
- Recorded: 2012
- Genre: Alternative hip hop; R&B
- Length: 4:47
- Label: Young Money; Cash Money; Republic
- Songwriters: Onika Maraj; Matthew Samuels; Matthew Burnett
- Producers: Boi-1da; Matthew Burnett

Nicki Minaj singles chronology
"Beauty and a Beat" (2012)	"Freedom" (2012)	"Freaks" (2013)

Music video
- "Nicki Minaj - Freedom (Explicit)" on YouTube

Music video
- "Nicki Minaj - Freedom (Network Version/Closed Captioned)" on YouTube

"Freedom" is a song by rapper Nicki Minaj from the reissue of her second studio album, Pink Friday: Roman Reloaded – The Re-Up (2012). It was released on November 2, 2012 by Young Money, Cash Money and Universal Republic as the second single from the album. It was written by Minaj, producer Matthew Samuels, and Matthew Burnett. The song was released for digital download in the US and Canada on November 2, 2012 and in other countries on November 6, 2012. It is downtempo hip hop and R&B, featuring a "sonically breezy" soundscape, complied with ambient riffs, pop-inspired synths, and soft pop choruses.

"Freedom" peaked at number 17 on the UK R&B Chart, number 23 on the US Rap Songs, and number 31 on the US Hot R&B/Hip-Hop Songs. The music video was released on November 15, 2012. It was shot mainly in black and white, and features Minaj in a variety of scenes such as a deserted area with a boat, dressed as a Queen on a throne, and is interspersed with scenes of nature.

== Background and composition ==
In September 2012, Minaj announced the reissue of Pink Friday: Roman Reloaded, subtitled The Re-Up, containing an additional disc with eight newly-recording songs and an exclusive behind-the-scenes DVD. Minaj commented at the 2012 MTV Video Music Awards, "I'm putting lots of new songs on there and I'm actually going to drop my new single like next week." Production of The Re-Up was a main focus on Minaj's three-part E! special, Nicki Minaj: My Truth, which aired in November 2012. On On Air with Ryan Seacrest, Minaj stated that "I feel like the music is such a better representation of me where I am now as an artist in my career. As long as people can hear the music, I'm good."

Musically, "Freedom" is a hip hop and R&B. The song features street-slang bravado and "venomous" rapping in the verses with thin, fragile vocals over whipsy soft pop choruses. The instrumentation in "Freedom" mixes together smooth ambient riffs, pop-inspired crystal-clear synthesizers, and a smooth R&B beat, creating a sonically breezy soundscape. Lyrically, Minaj is confrontational yet reflective, talking about her life in the spotlight and rise to fame. In the lyrics, Minaj states how other rappers "in the competition" will never thank her for opening the doors for them, and how they don't even thank their creator Jesus Christ for helping them get far, saying: "They'll never thank me for opening doors / But they ain't even thank Jesus when he died on the cross / 'Cause your spirit is ungrateful, bitches is so hateful, I remain a staple."

== Critical reception ==
Charley Rogulewski of Vibe said "The old Nicki Minaj is back on her latest track "Freedom."", while going onto note the songs "dreamy" production and compared it to "Right Thru Me," "Your Love" and "Save Me" off her debut album. Entertainment Weekly reviewer Kyle Anderson called the song "middle-of-the-road R&B" and criticized Minaj for choosing to make music that appeals to pop radio, instead of being unique. Josiah Hughes of Exclaim! was critical of the song, saying it was: "by-the-books Nicki, as she delivers venomous raps on the verses before giving saccharine-sweet melody a whirl on the choruses. Surprise, surprise — the whole thing is delivered atop poppy, crystal clear synths."

== Music video ==
Minaj wearing a gold gown with a cross

Tom Eames of Digital Spy complimented the video for its "glamorous" shots of Minaj, a sentiment echoed by Liza Darwin of MTV News, who said: "We already know Nicki's got her beauty and fashion game on lock these days, but for her new vid the singer ditches the bustiers, tutus, and Zenon-inspired ensembles for a toned-down (for her, at least) wardrobe of glittery gowns, decadent furs, and more than one crown. After all, if there's ANYONE fit to be queen bee, it's this lady."

== Live performances ==
Minaj performed the song live for the first time on the American Music Awards of 2012 on November 18, 2012. For the performance, Minaj wore a white fur cape and boots, and was later joined on-stage by a choir. "Freedom" was also performed on The Ellen DeGeneres Show on January 15, 2013, where she sang in a slim red dress, surrounded by fog and gina chandeliers. On January 25, 2013, Minaj performed the song along with "Va Va Voom" and on Jimmy Kimmel Live! on January 25, 2013.

== Charts ==
Chart (2012)	Peak position
UK Singles (OCC)	107
UK Hip Hop/R&B (Official Charts)	17
US Bubbling Under Hot 100 (Billboard)	7
US Hot R&B/Hip-Hop Songs (Billboard)	31

== Radio and release history ==
Country	Date	Format	Label
United States	November 2, 2012	Digital download	Cash Money Records
Canada	November 2, 2012	Digital download	Cash Money Records
United Kingdom	November 6, 2012	Digital download	Cash Money Records
Australia	November 6, 2012	Digital download	Cash Money Records
Bulgaria	November 6, 2012	Digital download	Cash Money Records
New Zealand	November 6, 2012	Digital download	Cash Money Records
United States	November 27, 2012	Urban contemporary radio	Cash Money Records
United Kingdom	November 28, 2012	Mainstream radio	Cash Money Records
