= Caterpillar (song) =

Song by Royce da 5'9" featuring Eminem and King Green

Single by Royce da 5'9" featuring Eminem and King Green

from the album Book of Ryan
- Released: May 3, 2018
- Recorded: October 2017
- Genre: Hip-hop; boom bap
- Length: 4:43
- Label: Heaven Studios; eOne
- Songwriters: Ryan Montgomery; Marshall Mathers; Larry Griffin, Jr.; King Green
- Producers: S1; Epikh Pro

Royce da 5'9" singles chronology
"Dumb" (2018)	"Caterpillar" (2018)	"Black Savage" (2019)

Eminem singles chronology
"Nowhere Fast" (2018)	"Caterpillar" (2018)	"Remind Me" (2018)

Music video
- "Caterpillar" on YouTube

"Caterpillar" is a song by American rapper Royce da 5'9" featuring fellow American rappers Eminem and King Green, released as the fourth single from the former's seventh studio album Book of Ryan (2018). Produced by Symbolyc (S1) One and Epikh Pro, it was released for digital download through iTunes on May 3, 2018.

== Background ==
The single was released to iTunes and Royce da 5'9"'s YouTube Vevo channel on May 3, 2018. Its release was accompanied with a music video. According to Royce, "I knew as soon as I heard the beat, I knew I wanted [Eminem] on there."

A remix, featuring American rapper Logic, is included on the bonus track edition of Royce's Book of Ryan. Originally, Logic was meant to appear on the main version of the song, but was later replaced by Eminem. Royce explained that this was because he and Logic "couldn't figure out a good time for us to be able to shoot [the video]." Eminem and Logic further collaborated on Logic's album Confessions of a Dangerous Mind (2019) on the track "Homicide".

== Composition ==
The intro of the song samples "Introduction / The Revolution Will Not Be Televised" by Gil Scott-Heron. The song finds Royce da 5'9" and Eminem rapping over an "organ-driven" boom bap beat, with King Green on the chorus. Eminem takes aim at mumble rap, rapping: "The boom bap is coming back / With an ax to mumble rap". In an interview with Rap-Up, Royce said:

The basic theme of the song is, "Don't disrespect the caterpillar to praise the butterfly." Marshall falls a little bit more into that category than I do, but both of us are caterpillars. A lot of times, you'll praise these guys but gotta tear us down… But where do you think his style came from?

== Critical reception ==
The song has been described as the return of Bad Meets Evil, the duo that the two rappers had formed. Israel Daramola of Spin called the song a "throwback record to the jazzy, hard rapping style of the '90s, acting as a vehicle for Royce and Em to exercise their lyrical prowess." Mackenzie Cummings-Grady of Billboard writes that "Royce and Em attack the boom-bap beat with furious intensity." Ralph Bristout of Revolt describes the song as a "nearly five-minute display of rap calisthenics."

== Music video ==
The music video was filmed in black and white and directed by James Larese. In it, Royce da 5'9" and Eminem take turns rapping while the other "remains stoic".

== Track listing ==
Digital Download

No.	Title	Writer(s)	Producer(s)	Length
1.	"Caterpillar" (featuring Eminem and King Green)	Ryan Montgomery; Marshall Mathers; Larry Griffin, Jr.; King Green	S1; Epikh Pro	4:43

== Charts ==
Chart (2018)	Peak position
US Bubbling Under Hot 100 (Billboard)	13
