= Comeback Season (mixtape) =

Mixtape by Drake
- Released: September 1, 2007
- Genres: Hip hop; R&B
- Length: 67:18
- Label: OVO
- Producers: Al Welsch; Rich Kidd; Noah "40" Shebib; Nottz; AmpLive; Mike Tiger; Terral "T. Slick"; Boi-1da; T-Minus; Kanye West; Exchange Student; J Dilla; Häzel; Neenyo; Jump; Sid Roams; DJ Revolution; DJ Toomp; 9th Wonder; Robin Thicke; Pro Jay; Stargate

Drake chronology
Room for Improvement (2006)	Comeback Season (2007)	So Far Gone (2009)

Singles from Comeback Season
- 1. "Replacement Girl" Released: April 30, 2007

Comeback Season is the second mixtape by Canadian rapper Drake. It was self-released on September 1, 2007. It contains guest appearances from Trey Songz, Andreena Mill, Dwele, Little Brother, Rich Boy, Kardinal Offishall, No Malice, Phonte, and Elzhi. In contrast to its predecessor, it finds Drake mainly performing over preexisting hip hop instrumentals.

== Background ==
In 2007, Comeback Season spawned a single and a music video for "Replacement Girl", featuring Trey Songz, that was executive produced by Terral "T. Slack" of BPE. Also in 2007, Drake became the first unsigned Canadian rapper to have his music video featured on BET when his first single, "Replacement Girl", was featured as the "New Joint of the Day" on April 30, 2007.

== Track listing ==
All songs are written by Drake.

No.	Title	Producer(s)	Length
1.	"Intro"	Al Welsch	0:30
2.	"The Presentation"	Rich Kidd; 40	3:33
3.	"Comeback Season"	Nottz	2:46
4.	"Closer" (featuring Andreena Mill)	AmpLive; Mike Tiger	5:11
5.	"Replacement Girl" (featuring Trey Songz)	Terral "T. Slack"; Boi-1da; T-Minus	3:42
6.	"Barry Bonds (Freestyle)"	Kanye West; Nottz	3:22
7.	"Going in for Life"	The Exchange Student	2:29
8.	"Where to Now"	J Dilla	1:54
9.	"Share"	Häzel	1:46
10.	"Give Ya" (featuring Trey Songz)	Terral "T. Slack"	3:24
11.	"Don't U Have a Man" (featuring Dwele and Little Brother)	Boi-1da	3:56
12.	"Bitch Is Crazy"	40	2:45
13.	"The Last Hope" (featuring Kardinal Offishall and Andreena Mill)	Rich Kidd	3:10
14.	"Must Hate Money" (featuring Rich Boy)	Neenyo; Jump	4:04
15.	"Asthma Team"	Sid Roams; DJ Revolution	1:59
16.	"Do What U Do (Remix)" (featuring No Malice and Nickelus F)	Boi-1da	2:56
17.	"Easy to Please" (featuring Richie Sosa)	Rich Kidd	2:09
18.	"Faded" (featuring Nickelus F)	Rich Kidd	3:00
19.	"Underdog" (featuring Trey Songz)	DJ Toomp	3:00
20.	"Think Good Thoughts" (featuring Phonte and Elzhi)	9th Wonder	4:52
21.	"Teach U a Lesson (Freestyle)"	Robin Thicke; Pro Jay	1:56
22.	"Missin' You (Freestyle)"	Stargate	2:03
23.	"Man of the Year (Freestyle)" (featuring Lil Wayne)	Boi-1da; DJ Revolution; Jump	2:51
Total length:			67:18

Bonus tracks
No.	Title	Producer	Length
1.	"The Winner"	The Bizness
2.	"New Shit"	Notts

Sample credits

- "Comeback Season" samples "Failure" as performed by Lupe Fiasco.
- "Closer" samples the song with the same name performed by Goapele.
- "Barry Bonds (Freestyle)" samples "Barry Bonds" as performed by Kanye West.
- "Going in for Life" samples "Intimate Friends" as performed by Eddie Kendricks.
- "Where to Now" samples "Time: The Donut of the Heart" as performed by J Dilla.
- "Think Good Thoughts" samples "Sweet Love" as performed by Anita Baker.
- "Teach U a Lesson (Freestyle)" samples "Teach U a Lesson" as performed by Robin Thicke.
- "Missin' You (Freestyle)" samples "Missin' You" as performed by Trey Songz.
- "Man of the Year (Freestyle)" samples "Man of the Year" as performed by Brisco, Flo Rida, and Lil Wayne.
