= The Slakadeliqs =

Canadian soul and R&B band

The Slakadeliqs are a Canadian soul and R&B band. Based in Toronto, Ontario, the band is fronted by musician and producer Slakah the Beatchild, who was previously best known as a producer for artists such as D. O., Divine Brown, Miles Jones and Drake.

== History ==
The band released its debut album, The Other Side of Tomorrow, independently in early 2012. Guest musicians on the album include Justin Nozuka, Shad and Tingsek. The album was named as a longlisted nominee for the 2012 Polaris Music Prize on June 14, 2012.

In 2012, Beatchild & The Slakadeliqs signed with Reservoir Media Management. As Slakah the Beatchild, the band went on to release Soul Movement Volume 2 in 2014 and Heavy Rockin' Steady in 2018.

== Discography ==
- Soul Movement Volume 1 (as Slakah the Beatchild) (2008)
- Something Forever EP (as Slakah the Beatchild) (2010)
- The Other Side of Tomorrow (2012)
- Soul Movement Volume 2 (as Slakah the Beatchild) (2014)
- Heavy Rockin' Steady (2018)
