= Pink Friday: Roman Reloaded – The Re-Up =

Studio album (reissue) by Nicki Minaj
- Released: November 19, 2012
- Recorded: 2012
- Genres: Hip-hop; dance-pop; R&B
- Length: 101:30
- Labels: Young Money; Cash Money; Universal Republic
- Producers: Carl Falk; Nicholas Cooper; Jean Baptise; Rico Beats; Boi-1da; BlackOut Movement; Cirkut; Crazy Mike; DJ Diamond Kuts; Dr. Luke; Flippa123; Grizzlee; Hit Boy; Parker Ighile; Jimmy Joker; Jonas Jeberg; Juicy J; Kane; Ke'Noe; Kool Kojak; Stephen Kozmeniuk; Alex Da Kid; The Maven Boys; Mel & Mus; Oak Felder; Alex P; Party Animal; RedOne; J.R. Rotem; Nikhil Seetharam; T-Minus; Pop Wansel; Rami Yacoub

Nicki Minaj chronology
Pink Friday: Roman Reloaded (2012)	Pink Friday: Roman Reloaded – The Re-Up (2012)	The Pinkprint (2014)

Singles from Pink Friday: Roman Reloaded – The Re-Up
- 1. "The Boys" Released: September 13, 2012; 2. "Freedom" Released: November 2, 2012; 3. "High School" Released: April 16, 2013

Pink Friday: Roman Reloaded – The Re-Up is the reissue of rapper Nicki Minaj's second album, Pink Friday: Roman Reloaded (2012). It was released on November 19, 2012, by Young Money Entertainment, Cash Money Records and Universal Republic Records. Released seven months after the original, The Re-Up features seven newly recorded songs and an exclusive behind-the-scenes footage DVD. The new material incorporates hip hop, dance-pop and R&B styles. As co-executive producer, Minaj enlisted collaborators Boi-1da, Juicy J and T-Minus.

Upon its release, Pink Friday: Roman Reloaded – The Re-Up received generally positive reviews from music critics, who complimented the balanced variety of genres. Its three singles "The Boys", "Freedom", and "High School" peaked at numbers 41, 31, and 20 on the US Billboard Hot R&B/Hip-Hop Songs chart respectively, and the latter peaked at number 64 on the Billboard Hot 100. The album was additionally promoted through the Pink Friday: Reloaded Tour and Minaj's performance of "Freedom" at the 2012 American Music Awards.

== Background ==
At the 2012 MTV Video Music Awards, Minaj announced the reissue of Pink Friday: Roman Reloaded, commenting "I'm putting lots of new songs on there and I'm actually going to drop my new single like next week. Barbz, you are gonna spaz. You are gonna love it. You are gonna go crazy!" She said in 2023 that she made The Re-Up because she felt the original lacked "soul", and she considers it the proper version of the album. Its artwork was released the following month, featuring an image of Minaj from the music video of her song "I Am Your Leader". In November, she added that the expanded album would contain an additional disc with seven newly recorded songs and an exclusive behind-the-scenes DVD to supplement the standard edition of the original album. The project served as the main focus of her three-part E! special Nicki Minaj: My Truth.

== Composition ==
"High School"
A sample of "High School" by Nicki Minaj featuring Lil Wayne, which incorporates prominent elements of hip hop.

Minaj commented on On Air with Ryan Seacrest that "I feel like the music is such a better representation of me where I am now as an artist in my career. As long as people can hear the music, I'm good." Much of the new material incorporates hip hop and R&B styles previously seen in Minaj's earlier mixtapes. The opening track "Up in Flames" incorporates a "slow, heavy and melodramatic beat", where Minaj addresses her wealth and delivers negative remarks directed towards her adversaries. The second song "Freedom" was compared to material from her debut studio album Pink Friday (2010); it utilizes minimal production and reflects on Minaj's rise to prominence. The third song "Hell Yeah" features Parker and further criticizes Minaj's opponents. She references her much-publicized on-set tension with fellow American Idol judge Mariah Carey in the line "But I'm quick to check a bitch if she’s outta line" and references the series' personnel in the line "Shout out Mike Darnell and Nigel [Lythgoe] / Why these bums so mad that the queen on Idol".

The fourth track "High School" features Lil Wayne and discusses sexual desires with a man who had been in prison. The fifth song "I'm Legit" features Ciara and was characterized by having "snappy flows" and being "primed for the streets and clubs". The sixth track "I Endorse These Strippers" features Tyga and Brinx; its lyrics were described by Sal Cinquemani of Slant as "less clever than inexcusably archaic". The seventh song "The Boys" features American recording artist Cassie. It incorporates both hip hop and electropop influences, and has been described as a "girls' night anthem". The final track "Va Va Voom" was previously included on the original deluxe version of Pink Friday: Roman Reloaded, and also contains prominent electropop styles.

== Singles ==
"The Boys", a collaboration with Cassie, was released as the lead single from The Re-Up on September 13, 2012. The song peaked at number 41 on the US Billboard Hot R&B/Hip-Hop Songs chart. Its music video premiered through Vevo on October 18, 2012.

"Freedom" was released as the second single digitally through iTunes on November 2, 2012. The song peaked at number 31 on the Billboard Hot R&B/Hip-Hop Songs chart. Its music video premiered on 106 and Park on November 19, 2012.

The third single "High School" features Lil Wayne and was released on April 16, 2013. The song peaked at number 64 on the Billboard Hot 100, and at number 20 on the Billboard Hot R&B/Hip-Hop Songs chart. Its music video was released by MTV on April 2, 2013.

In 2021, the track "I'm Legit", featuring Ciara received a resurgence almost 9 years since its original release on TikTok, being used in many videos.

== Critical reception ==
Professional ratings
Aggregate scores
Source	Rating
Metacritic	72/100
Review scores
Source	Rating
AllMusic	3.5/5 stars
Boston Phoenix	3.5/4 stars
The Independent	3/5 stars
Los Angeles Times	3/4 stars
Slant Magazine	3/5 stars

Pink Friday: Roman Reloaded - The Re-Up received generally positive reviews from music critics. At Metacritic, which assigns a normalized rating out of 100 to reviews from mainstream critics, the album received an average score of 72, based on eight reviews, an improvement over the average score of 60 received by the original release of Roman Reloaded. David Jeffries of AllMusic opined that "the too-pop Roman Reloaded now feels more balanced once this eight-track EP worth of material tips the scales", adding that the additional tracks and DVD is "the better deal and bigger picture" than the original. Dan Weiss of the Boston Phoenix complimented Minaj's rapping, commenting that "the rapper who rhymes "fri-vo-lous" with "po-ly-ga-mist" is X-Acto sharp as ever". The Los Angeles Times' Gerrick D. Kennedy noted the variety of genres incorporated in the reissue, stating "Sure, she flirts with dance pop and R&B balladry, but you can forgive her for wanting to satisfy different tastes. Here, it actually works". Andy Gill of The Independent provided a mixed review, feeling that the material was generic and "does not add much to the Minaj experience". Slant Magazine's Sal Cinquemani criticized the lyrical content and featured guests, adding that "as long as [Minaj] keeps comparing herself to Jesus, we probably shouldn't hold our breath". Kyle Anderson of Entertainment Weekly panned the album and placed it at number two on his list of The Worst Albums Of The Year, writing that the album was "soul-less, lazy, and totally unnecessary."

== Commercial performance ==
Charting together with the original Pink Friday: Roman Reloaded (according to the rules by Billboard), The Re-Up sold 36,000 copies in first-week sales and rose eighty spots on the US Billboard 200, from number 107 to number 27, with a 591% sales gain. An associate from Billboard commented on the commercial performance of The Re-Up stating that "expanded reissues aren't always guaranteed big sellers. It really depends on the extra content and timing of the release ... Nicki's reissue was seemingly timed to profit from holiday shopping", also adding that the sales of The Re-Up were actually better than similar reissues by Minaj's contemporaries. In New Zealand, the album charted within Roman Reloaded release and debuted at twenty-one.

Minaj commented that of the album's limited availability, "it's hard to get the album because the stores basically said that the last few re-releases [stores] had put out did not do well and they didn't want to take a chance. Target and Wal-Mart are not selling the album, and Target is actually my biggest retailer. Best Buy only took limited [stock] because they wanted to play it safe. It kinda sets you up to fail." Walmart responded that they do not issue albums with the Parental Advisory label, while Target sold the record on their website anyway.

== Track listing ==
Disc 1 – The Re-Up track listing
No.	Title	Writer(s)	Producer(s)	Length
1.	"Up in Flames"	Onika Maraj; Matthew Samuels; Zale Epstein; Stephen Kozmeniuk; Brett Kruger	Boi-1da; The Maven Boys	5:05
2.	"Freedom"	Maraj; Samuels; Matthew Burnett	Boi-1da; Burnett*	4:47
3.	"Hell Yeah" (featuring Parker)	Maraj; Parker Ighile	Parker Ighile	4:11
4.	"High School" (featuring Lil Wayne)	Maraj; Dwayne Carter, Jr.	Boi-1da; T-Minus	3:37
5.	"I'm Legit" (featuring Ciara)	Maraj; Ester Dean; Melvin Hough II; Keith Thomas; Rivelino Wouter	Mel & Mus	3:18
6.	"I Endorse These Strippers" (featuring Tyga and Brinx)	Maraj; Michael "Crazy Mike" Foster; Jawara Headley; Jordan Houston; Michael Stevenson	Juicy J; Crazy Mike	4:22
7.	"The Boys" (with Cassie)	Maraj; Jonas Jeberg; Jean Baptiste; Lillianna Saldaña; Anjulie Persaud	Jeberg; Baptiste*	4:08
8.	"Va Va Voom"	Maraj; Gottwald; Grigg; Martin; Walter	Dr. Luke; Kool Kojak; Cirkut*	3:02
Total length:				32:31

Notes

- (*) Denotes co-producer.
- Disc 2 – Features an exclusive behind-the-scenes footage DVD with a total length of 68:59.
- Disc 3 – Roman Reloaded mirrors the track listing of the standard edition of Pink Friday: Roman Reloaded.
- All songs of the Re-Up edition also appear in the 2023 deluxe edition reissue of Pink Friday: Roman Reloaded.

== Personnel ==
Credits adapted from Allmusic.

Performance

- Nicki Minaj – primary artist
- 2 Chainz – featured artist
- Beenie Man – featured artist
- Brinx – featured artist
- Chris Brown – featured artist
- Cam'ron – featured artist
- Ciara - featured artist
- Cassie – featured artist
- Drake – featured artist
- Lil Wayne – featured artist
- Nas – featured artist
- Parker – featured artist
- Rick Ross – featured artist
- Tyga – featured artist
- Bobby V – featured artist
- Young Jeezy – featured artist
- Marissa Bregman – vocals
- Carl Falk – vocals
- Kalenna Harper – vocals
- Wayne Hector – vocals
- Amoy Levy – vocals
- Mohombi – vocals
- Renee Rowe – vocals
- AJ Junior – vocals (background)
- Bilal "The Chef" Hajji – vocals (background)
- LaKeisha Lewis – vocals (background)
- Jeanette Olsson – vocals (background)
- RedOne – vocals (background)
- Teddy Sky – vocals (background)
- Candace Marie Wakefield – vocals (background)

Producers

- Cortez Bryant – executive producer
- Dwayne Carter – executive producer
- Nicki Minaj – executive producer
- Jermaine Preyan – executive producer
- Safaree "SB" Samuels – executive producer
- Bryan "Baby Birdman" Williams – executive producer
- Ronald "Slim Tha Don" Williams – executive producer
- Carl Falk – guitar producer
- Nicholas Cooper – vocal producer

Technical

- Chris Athens – mastering
- Boi-1da – drums, mixing
- Tanisha Broadwater – production coordination
- Michael "Banger" Cadahia – engineer
- Ariel Chobaz – engineer, mixing
- Noel Cadastre – recording assistant
- Cirkut – instrumentation, musician programming
- Donald "Tixie" Dixon – engineer
- Aubry "Big Juice" Delaine – mixing
- Dr. Luke – instrumentation, musician programming
- Zale Epstein – drum programming
- Carl Falk – guitar, instrumentation, mixing
- Elizabeth Gallardo – recording assistant
- Brian "Big Bass" Gardner – mastering
- Serban Ghenea – mixing
- Clint Gibbs – recording assistant
- John Hanes – mixing engineer
- Jess Jackson – engineer
- Jimmy Joker – instrumentation
- Koool Kojak – musician
- Stephen Kozmeniuk – bells, engineer, guitar, organ, synthesizer, viola
- Gelly Kusuma – engineer
- Maven Boys – additional production
- Donnie Meadows – production coordination
- Katie Mitzell – production coordination
- Trevor Muzzy – engineer, mixing, vocal editing
- Chris "Tek" O'Ryan – engineer
- Alex P. – engineer, instrumentation, vocal editing
- Parker Ighile – engineer mixing,
- RedOne – instrumentation, vocal editing
- Irene Richter – production coordination
- John Rivers – engineer
- Tim Roberts – mixing assistant
- Bret Ryan – clapping, piano
- Phil Seaford – mixing assistant
- Noah Shebib – engineer
- Jon Sher – mixing assistant, recording assistant
- Finis "KY" White – engineer
- Stuart White – engineer
- Rami Yacoub – instrumentation, mixing, vocal editing
- Scott "Yarmov" Yarmovsky – production coordination

== Charts ==
=== Weekly charts ===
Chart (2012–2013)	Peak position
Belgium Flanders Albums Chart^{[A]}	84
Belgium Wallonia Albums Chart^{[A]}	118
Dutch Albums Chart^{[A]}	79
French Albums Chart^{[A]}	80
New Zealand Albums Chart^{[A]}	21
Spanish Albums Chart^{[A]}	97
US Billboard 200^{[A]}	27
US Top R&B/Hip-Hop Albums^{[A]}	4
US Rap Albums^{[A]}	3

=== Year-end charts ===
Chart (2012)	Position
Australian Albums Chart	48
Australian Urban Albums Chart	4
New Zealand Albums Chart	42

Notes

- A In these territories, The Re-Up was combined with the original chart entry for Pink Friday: Roman Reloaded, and thus re-entered the chart as one release.

== Certifications ==
Certifications for Pink Friday...Roman Reloaded Re-Up
Region	Certification	Certified units/sales
Australia (ARIA)	Platinum	70,000^{‡}
New Zealand (RMNZ)	Platinum	15,000^{‡}
^{‡} Sales+streaming figures based on certification alone.

== Release history ==
Regions	Dates	Format(s)	Label(s)
United States	November 19, 2012	CD/DVD, digital download	Universal Music, Young Money, Cash Money
Canada	November 19, 2012	CD/DVD, digital download	Universal Music, Young Money, Cash Money
United Kingdom	November 19, 2012	CD/DVD, digital download	Universal Island, Cash Money
Japan	November 19, 2012	CD/DVD, digital download	Republic
France	November 26, 2012	CD/DVD, digital download	Def Jam Recordings
Poland	November 27, 2012	CD/DVD, digital download	Universal Music Polska
Spain	November 27, 2012	CD/DVD, digital download	Universal Music Spain
Malaysia	December 18, 2012	CD/DVD, digital download	Universal Music Malaysia
