= Miles Jones (musician) =

Canadian musician (born 1983)

- Also known as: Runaway Jones
- Born: Miles Gillespie Jones; 24 March 1983
- Origin: Toronto, Ontario, Canada
- Genre: Hip hop/Soul
- Occupations: rapper, singer-songwriter, producer
- Years active: 2004–present
- Labels: Mojo Records & Publishing
- Website: www.runawayjones.com

Miles Gillespie Jones (born 1983) is a Canadian hip hop/soul musician. Miles founded Mojo Records and Publishing in 2004 to provide an outlet for artists, producers and DJs to produce and publish audio works. Miles career began with a solo album he released in 2006 release which was his University thesis project titled One Chance. In 2009, he followed up with Hip Hop second album titled, Runaway Jones, which landed placements on CSI Las Vegas, ABC's Rookie Blue and CTV's 2010 Olympic games soundtrack of the nation.

== Discography ==
- General Consensus Volumes 1–3
- 2005: Mike Ford – Canada Needs You (Production)
- 2006: One Chance
- 2007: DJ Wristpect – Bridging the Gap Volume 2 Toronto to Chicago
- 2009: Never Too Late (Single) Produced by Black Milk
- 2009: Runaway Jones (Canada)- (URBNET/Fontana/Universal)
- 2010: Never Wrong (Single) (US) – (MB3/Caroline)
- 2011: Time Machine (Single) (US) – (URBNET/Mojo)
- 2011: Runaway Jones (US) – (Foundation/Mojo)
- 2011: Catch Me in the Rye – (Foundation/Mojo)
- 2012: Act So Strange (EP)
- 2012: All Lies (Single)
- 2012: Maybe Tomorrow (Single)
- 2012: The Jones Act Part III (URBNET/Foundation/Mojo)

== Videos ==
- No More feat. Marinda – 2012 – Director: Aaron Alleyne
- Time Machine – 2011 – Director: Sean Harvey
- Never Wrong (Remix) – 2011 – Director: Aaron Alleyne
- Rhyme Like This feat. Percee P – 2010 – Director: Isaac Cravit
- Trust Me feat. RaSoul – 2010 – Director: Michael Kane

== Awards ==
- 2007 Ontario Independent Music Awards Hip Hop Artist of the Year
- Winner of 9th Annual Independent Music Awards (IMA): Rap/Hip-Hop song "Coast to Coast".
- Nominated for 2009 Indie Awards: Favourite Hip Hop Artist
- Winner of the 2010 Billboard World Song Contest : Rap/Hip-Hop song "Coast to Coast".
- Winner of The 10th Annual Independent Music Awards in the Rap/Hip-Hop Song category for "Time Machine".

== Licensing ==
- "Coast To Coast" – CTV Olympic Broadcast – 2010
- "Coast To Coast" – CSI: Las Vegas – Season 10 (CBS)
- "Baby Boy" – Degrassi
- "Again" – The Best Years 2
- "The Boom Boom" – Degrassi
- "Pumps and Polos" LA Complex (2012)
- "Coast to Coast" Rookie Blue -ABC (2012)
