= Boi-1da =

Jamaican-Canadian record producer (born 1986)

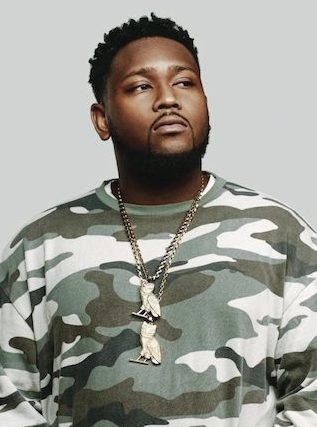
- Samuels in 2019

Background information
- Also known as: Boi1da
- Born: Matthew Jehu Samuels; October 12, 1986 (age 40); Kingston, Jamaica
- Origin: Toronto, Ontario, Canada
- Genres: Hip hop; R&B
- Occupations: Record producer; songwriter
- Years active: 2006–present
- Label: OVO Sound
- Website: www.boi1da.com

Matthew Jehu Samuels (born October 12, 1986), known professionally as Boi-1da (a play on Boy Wonder), is a Jamaican-Canadian record producer and songwriter based in Toronto, Ontario.

He is an in-house producer for Drake's OVO Sound label and has produced for a variety of artists and groups, including Drake, Rihanna, Eminem, Jay-Z, Nicki Minaj, Nas, Jack Harlow, Kanye West, and Kendrick Lamar. In 2015, Samuels served as the executive producer for Drake's mixtape If You're Reading This It's Too Late.

== Early life ==
Born in Kingston, Jamaica, Samuels moved to Canada when he was three and grew up in the North York and Scarborough districts of Toronto. He was also raised in Ajax, Ontario, where he attended Pickering High School. His father was a keen listener of dancehall music and so Samuels was brought up listening to Jamaican music. At the age of eight, his mother bought him a Casio keyboard, and at the age of 15, Arun Sellai had introduced him to FL Studio (formerly FruityLoops). Without any formal musical training, he started using the FL Studio beat-making program. A few years later, he won three consecutive Battle of the Beatmakers championships; because of this accomplishment, he was given a spot in the Battle of the Beatmakers judging panel.

His first production work was at the age of 18, when he worked on two tracks on a mixtape (Room for Improvement) for Drake.

== Career ==
Samuels began his career producing for Canadian actor Drake's early mixtapes, Room for Improvement (2006) and Comeback Season (2007). In 2008, he produced "Set It Off" by Canadian rapper Kardinal Offishall, which featured American rap duo Clipse and spawned a remix from American rapper Dr. Dre. In an interview with FLOW 93.5, Boi-1da revealed that he was working on beats for Dr. Dre's highly anticipated album, Detox, which was to be released in 2011. However, that album was indefinitely shelved, and none of the released or leaked tracks by Dr. Dre featured Boi-1da's production. He has since stated that he was working with songwriter Sean Garrett and has submitted tracks for Usher.

In 2010, Boi-1da produced his first song to peak the US Billboard Hot 100, "Not Afraid" by Eminem. He also produced "hahahaha jk?" from Das Racist's debut album Sit Down, Man the same year.

Boi-1da produced a bulk with Drake's second album, Take Care, which was released November 15, 2011.

In March 2013, he produced "5AM in Toronto" by Drake, which was later released in Drake's 2019 compilation album, "Care Package".

Boi-1da worked with rapper Lecrae on his song "Gimme a Second" from his mixtape Church Clothes. He also collaborated with rapper Bizzle on his 2013 album The Good Fight3. He is also a member of Drake's October's Very Own with Noah "40" Shebib and T-Minus.

Boi-1da produced "Party Favors" for Tinashe for her album Nightride. The single features Young Thug.

In January 2016, Rihanna released the dancehall track "Work", featuring Drake. The song peaked at number one on the Billboard Hot 100, becoming the second Boi-1da produced track to top the charts. Between 2016 and 2017, Boi-1da continued to produce dancehall tracks, such as Drake's "Controlla", Tyga's "1 of 1", PartyNextDoor's "Only U" and Nicki Minaj's "Regret in Your Tears".

He co-produced the 2016 Kanye West single "Real Friends".

In September 2017, he produced "No Limit" by G-Eazy featuring A$AP Rocky and Cardi B.

In January 2018, he produced "God's Plan" by Drake. In May 2018, he produced "TATI" by 6ix9ine featuring DJ Spinking. In August 2018, he produced "Lucky You" by Eminem featuring Joyner Lucas.

In March 2019, he produced "I'm Single" by Jake Paul, and "Maze" and "Make Believe" from Juice Wrld's album, "Death Race for Love". In May 2019, he produced "Isis" by Joyner Lucas featuring Logic. In June 2019, he produced "No Guidance" by Chris Brown featuring Drake. In July 2019, he produced "1000 Nights" by Ed Sheeran featuring Meek Mill and A Boogie wit da Hoodie.

In October 2020, he produced "Tyler Herro" by Jack Harlow.

In October 2023, it was announced that he had partnered with alcohol brand Bacardi to release an AI-powered album called ‘The A.I. Powered Album’, which involves training an AI model on a selection of his unreleased beats.

In March 2026, Samuels announced a new album, What If It All Goes Right?, which was first teased via the Canadian Soccer Association as a promotion to the 2026 FIFA World Cup that would take place in Canada. On April 10, 2026, he released "Electric Circus", a collaborative single with Nelly Furtado and Canada Soccer; it debuted at number 35 on the Canada CHR/Top 40 chart.

== Musical style ==
Boi-1da is known for his distinctive dancehall sound, having been brought up listening to dancehall before hip-hop. He often incorporates live instrumentation and an air horn sound effect into his beats, as used in dancehall and reggae, and frequently incorporates samples in his productions. Boi-1da has spoken out against songs which imitate dancehall, criticising fellow Toronto musician Tory Lanez for doing so in his 2016 single "Luv".

He currently uses FL Studio 12 to make beats, previously, he used Fruity Loops 3.56, 7 XL and 9.

Boi-1da has spoken about being influenced by producers such as Dr. Dre, Swizz Beatz, Timbaland, and The Neptunes.

== Personal life ==
=== Health ===
In late 2020, Boi-1da caught COVID-19. He had previously stated that he would not be taking any vaccine for the virus. Reflecting on his experience in 2025, he revealed that COVID-19 had left him bedridden for weeks and that he felt like he was "half-dead" at the time.

=== Politics ===
In the lead-up to the 2025 Canadian federal election, Boi-1da criticised Liberal Party politicians Justin Trudeau and Mark Carney and endorsed Pierre Poilievre's candidacy for Prime Minister.

== Awards and nominations ==
=== ASCAP Pop Music Awards ===
The American Society of Composers, Authors and Publishers (ASCAP) hosts a series of awards shows, honouring people in different music categories; pop music is one of its seven categories. In 2011, Drake presented the award to him and 40. They both won the ASCAP Pop Music Award for the Songwriters of the Year for "Over".

Year	Nominated work	Award	Result
2011	"Over"	Songwriters of the Year (with Noah "40" Shebib)	Won

=== Grammy Awards ===
The Grammy Awards are awarded annually by the National Academy of Recording Arts and Sciences. Boi-1da has one win out of fourteen nominations.

Year	Nominee / work	Award	Result
2010	"Best I Ever Had" (Drake)	Best Rap Song	Nominated
2011	"Not Afraid" (Eminem)	Best Rap Song	Nominated
2011	Recovery (Eminem)	Album of the Year	Nominated
2015	"0 to 100 / The Catch Up" (Drake)	Best Rap Song	Nominated
2016	"Energy" (Drake)	Best Rap Song	Nominated
2016	To Pimp a Butterfly (Kendrick Lamar)	Album of the Year	Nominated
2017	Views (Drake)	Album of the Year	Nominated
2017	"Work" (Rihanna)	Record of the Year	Nominated
2019	"God's Plan" (Drake)	Record of the Year	Nominated
2019	"God's Plan" (Drake)	Song of the Year	Nominated
2019	"God's Plan" (Drake)	Best Rap Song	Won
2019	"Lucky You" (Eminem)	Best Rap Song	Nominated
2019	"Win" (Jay Rock)	Best Rap Song	Nominated
2019	Boi-1da	Producer of the Year, Non-Classical	Nominated
